= Noronhomys =

Conservation status
- Extinct (1503) (IUCN 3.1)

Scientific classification
- Kingdom: Animalia
- Phylum: Chordata
- Class: Mammalia
- Order: Rodentia
- Family: Cricetidae
- Subfamily: Sigmodontinae
- Tribe: Oryzomyini
- Genus: †Noronhomys; Carplaton and Olson, 1999
- Species: †N. vespuccii

Binomial name
- †Noronhomys vespuccii Carleton and Olson, 1999
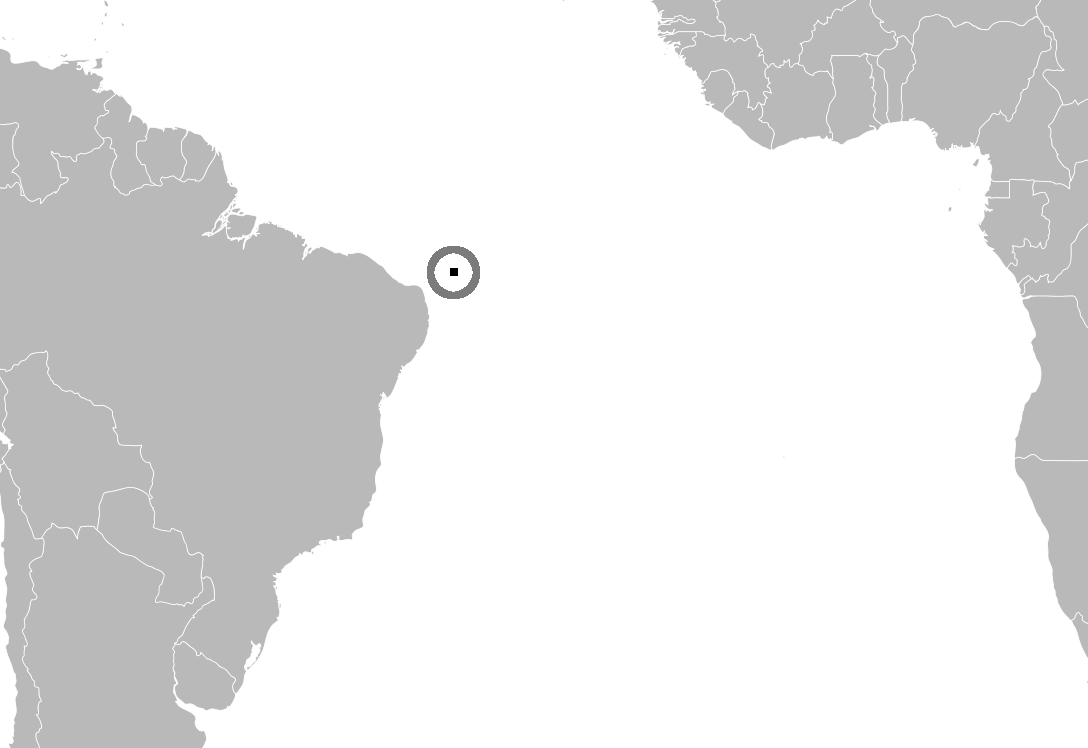
- Location of Fernando de Noronha, the island group to which Noronhomys was endemic.

Extinct rat species from the islands of Fernando de Noronha off northeastern Brazil

Noronhomys vespuccii, also known as Vespucci's rodent, is an extinct rat species from the islands of Fernando de Noronha off northeastern Brazil. Italian explorer Amerigo Vespucci may have seen it on a visit to Fernando de Noronha in 1503, but it subsequently became extinct, perhaps because of the exotic rats and mice introduced by the first explorers of the island. Numerous but fragmentary fossil remains of the animal, of uncertain but probably Holocene age, were discovered in 1973 and described in 1999.

Noronhomys vespuccii was a fairly large rodent, larger than the black rat (Rattus rattus). A member of the family Cricetidae and subfamily Sigmodontinae, it shares several distinctive characters with Holochilus and related genera within the tribe Oryzomyini, including high-crowned molars with simplified crown features and the presence of several ridges on the skull which help anchor the chewing muscles. Although a suite of traits suggest that Holochilus is its closest relative, it is distinctive in many ways and is therefore classified in a separate genus, Noronhomys. Its close relatives, including Holochilus and Lundomys, are adapted to a semiaquatic lifestyle, spending much of their time in the water, but features of the Noronhomys bones suggest that it lost its semiaquatic lifestyle, after arrival at its remote island.

== Discovery and taxonomy ==
Italian explorer Amerigo Vespucci may have seen this animal on his fourth voyage, which took him to Brazil; the Lettera di Amerigo Vespucci delle Isole Nuovamente in Quattro Suoi Viaggi recorded that he visited an island just south of the equator on August 10, 1503. On this island, identified as Fernando de Noronha, he saw "very big rats and lizards with two tails, and some snakes". The Lettera purports to be an account of Vespucci's voyages, but it is unlikely that he produced it himself and, additionally, his fourth voyage may never have taken place. The biological details given in the Lettera's account of Fernando de Noronha agree with what is known of the natural history of the island, lending weight to the view that it derives from a visit, whether by Vespucci himself or by another explorer. The lizard is probably Trachylepis atlantica and the record of snakes most likely refers to Amphisbaena ridleyi, which is actually an amphisbaenian instead of a snake.

During excavations conducted in 1973, American ornithologist Storrs L. Olson found fossils of a moderately large rat on Fernando de Noronha, which were described as a new genus and species in a 1999 publication by Olson and his colleague, mammalogist Michael D. Carleton. The material is now in the United States National Museum of Natural History in Washington, D.C., and in the museum of the Pontifícia Universidade Católica do Rio Grande do Sul in Porto Alegre, Rio Grande do Sul. The generic name, Noronhomys, combines the name of the island of Fernando de Noronha with the Ancient Greek μῦς mys "mouse" and the specific name, vespuccii, honors Amerigo Vespucci. Noronhomys would have been larger than the black rat (Rattus rattus), which was common on ships and which Vespucci would have been familiar with, consistent with his description of "very large rats".

- - Pseudoryzomys simplex
  - - Lundomys molitor
    - - Noronhomys vespuccii
      - - Holochilus brasiliensis
        - Holochilus sciureus

Suggested relationships of Noronhomys.

Noronhomys is a member of the tribe Oryzomyini, which includes over a hundred species distributed mainly in South America, including nearby islands such as the Galápagos Islands and some of the Antilles. Oryzomyini is one of several tribes recognized within the subfamily Sigmodontinae, which encompasses hundreds of species found across South America and into southern North America. Sigmodontinae itself is the largest subfamily of the family Cricetidae, other members of which include voles, lemmings, hamsters, and deermice, all mainly from Eurasia and North America.

Carleton and Olson performed a detailed comparison of Noronhomys to members of the mainland genera Holochilus and Lundomys on the basis of both general morphology and morphometrical data, concluding that the Fernando de Noronha rat is distinct from both other animals. They used a cladistic analysis to examine its relationships within Oryzomyini, also including two species of Holochilus, Lundomys, and five other oryzomyines. They found that Noronhomys appeared closest to Holochilus, with Lundomys more distantly related. Eighteen shared characters (synapomorphies) supported the grouping of Noronhomys with Holochilus. Another form described as a species of Holochilus, Holochilus primigenus, may also be related, but is likely to fall outside the Holochilus–Noronhomys clade; it has since been transferred to its own monotypic genus, Reigomys.

In 1998, a fragmentary fossil of another species of this group of oryzomyines was found in eastern Argentina. It was initially identified as a possible second species of Noronhomys on the basis of the presence of a crest on the upper first molar, the mesoloph, but the specimen is different from Noronhomys vespuccii in other respects, and in 2008 it was described as a new genus and species, Carletonomys cailoi, related to Noronhomys and associated genera.

== Description ==
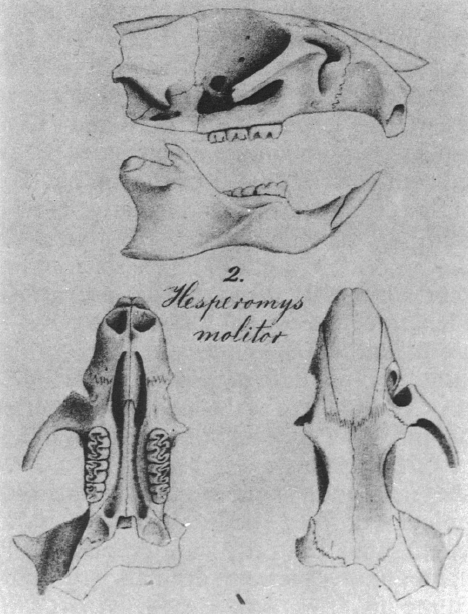
The skull of the living Lundomys molitor is similar to that of Noronhomys. (The illustrated mandible is not of a Lundomys.)

Noronhomys vespuccii is known from bone fragments, including five skulls, damaged to various degrees, and many isolated jaws and other bones. This material documents that, with a skull of about 4 cm (1.5 in) (occipitonasal length), Noronhomys was a moderately large oryzomyine, smaller than Lundomys but well within the range of Holochilus. It shares a number of the features that characterize the group of Holochilus and related genera, including a reduction in the complexity of the chewing surface of the molars, simple posterolateral palatal pits (perforations of the palate near the third molar), and a similarly shaped interorbital region of the skull. Noronhomys is distinctive, among other characters, in its lack of a spinous process on the zygomatic plate, the flattened front portion of the zygomatic arch (cheekbone); the short palate, which does not extend behind the third molars; and the presence of an accessory crest, the mesoloph, on the upper molars.

Analysis of morphometrical data from the known material of Noronhomys suggests that growth continued in adults—the older the animal, the larger the depth of the mandible and the size of the lower incisor—and does not provide evidence for a difference in size between males and females. Skull shape is strikingly different from both Holochilus and Lundomys, resulting in a clear separation from both of these taxa in statistical analyses of measurement data. In three individuals measured, the occipitonasal length, a measure of skull length, varies from 38.0 to 39.2 mm (1.50 to 1.54 in), averaging 38.5 mm (1.52 in). The width of the braincase is 13.4 to 14.8 mm (0.53 to 0.58 in), averaging 14.1 mm (0.56 in). Between the first molars, the width of the palate is 8.1 to 8.9 mm (0.32 to 0.35 in) in four specimens, averaging 8.4 mm (0.33 in). The lower molars have a total length of 7.57 to 8.29 mm (0.298 to 0.326 in), averaging 8.00 mm (0.315 in), in 39 specimens with intact molar rows. The femur (upper leg bone) is 32.5 to 41.0 mm (1.28 to 1.61 in) in length in nine specimens, averaging 36.5 mm (1.44 in). Carleton and Olson estimated that body mass in Noronhomys was similar to that of some populations of living Holochilus sciureus at about 200 to 250 g (7.1 to 8.8 oz).

=== Skull ===
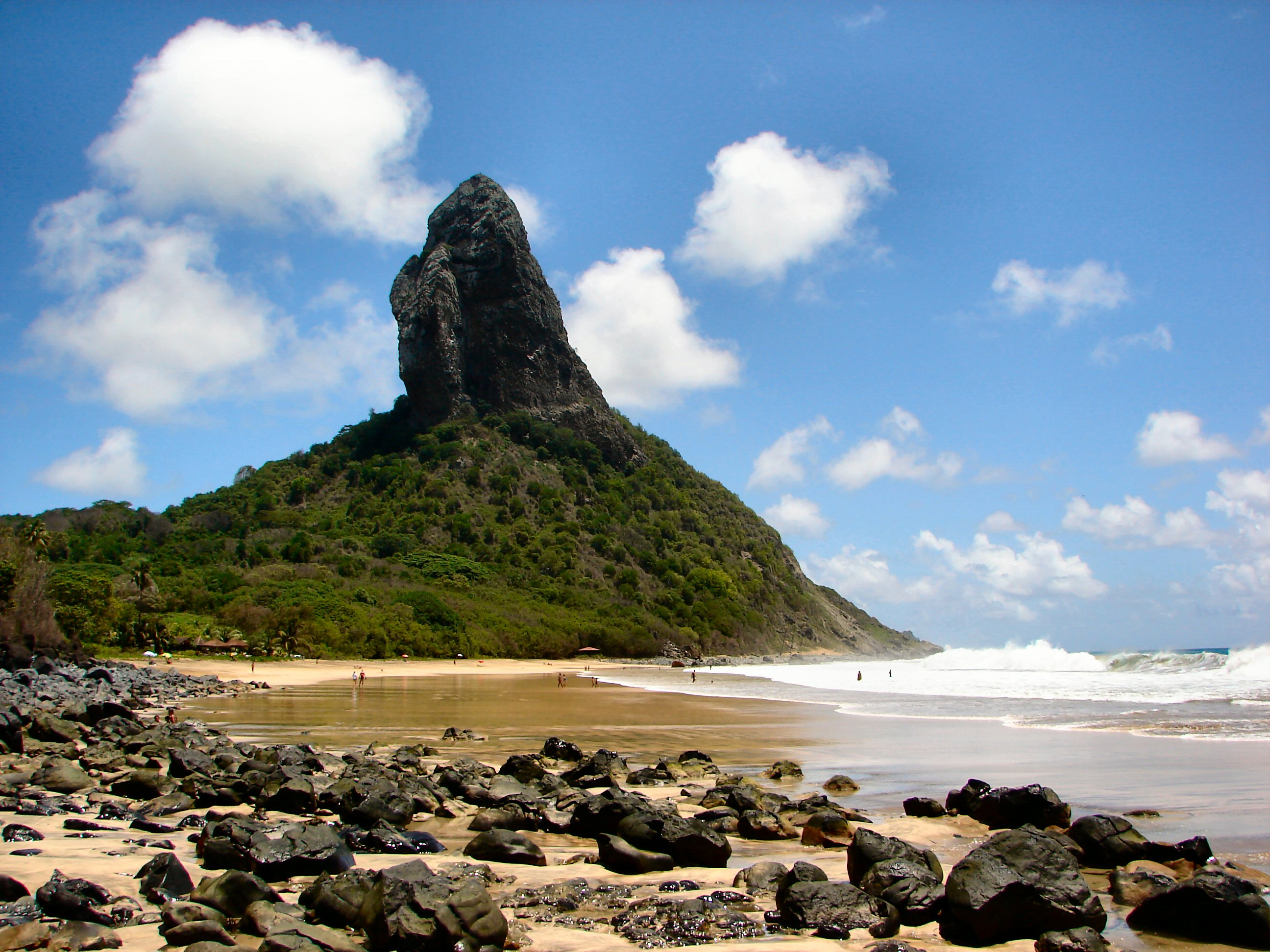
View of Morro do Pico on Fernando de Noronha.

The skull is flattened in general shape. The front part is short and broad. The broad interorbital region (located between the eyes) is hourglass-shaped, with squared edges and weakly developed beading. A postorbital ridge is present, obscuring the suture (joint) between the frontal and squamosal bones, a feature shared only with Holochilus among oryzomyines. The braincase is squarish. The interparietal bone is wide, but does not reach the squamosals on the sides. The zygomatic arches, which are well-developed, are furthest apart at the back and converge toward the front. The jugal bone is small.

The back margin of the zygomatic plate is located close to the front of the upper first molar. The incisive foramina do not extend between the molars. Unlike in both Holochilus and Lundomys, the palate is flat, lacking a distinct ridge at the midline. The parapterygoid fossae, which are located behind the palate at the level of the molars, are excavated somewhat above the level of the palate. A strut of the alisphenoid bone is present, separating two openings in the skull, the masticatory–buccinator foramen and the foramen ovale accessorium. The subsquamosal fenestra, an opening at the back of the skull determined by the shape of the squamosal, is present but small. The squamosal probably lacks a suspensory process that contacts the tegmen tympani, the roof of the tympanic cavity, a defining character of oryzomyines.

The mandible (lower jaw) is robust. The two masseteric ridges, which anchor some of the chewing muscles, are joined together as a single crest for a portion of their length and extend forward to a point below the first molar. The capsular process, a raising of the mandibular bone at the back end of the lower incisor, is well developed.

=== Teeth ===
In the upper incisors, the chewing edges are located behind the vertical plane of the incisors; thus, they are opisthodont. The microstructure of the enamel of the lower incisor was reported in a 2005 study. The inner portion (portio interna, PI) is much thicker than the outer portion (portio externa, PE). The PI consists of Hunter-Schreger bands, which are uniserial (consisting of a single enamel prism), as in all myomorph rodents. The PE consists of radial enamel, with flattened prisms that are almost parallel to the junction between the enamel and the dentine. The microstructure is similar to that of Holochilus brasiliensis and displays several characters seen only in Myomorpha.

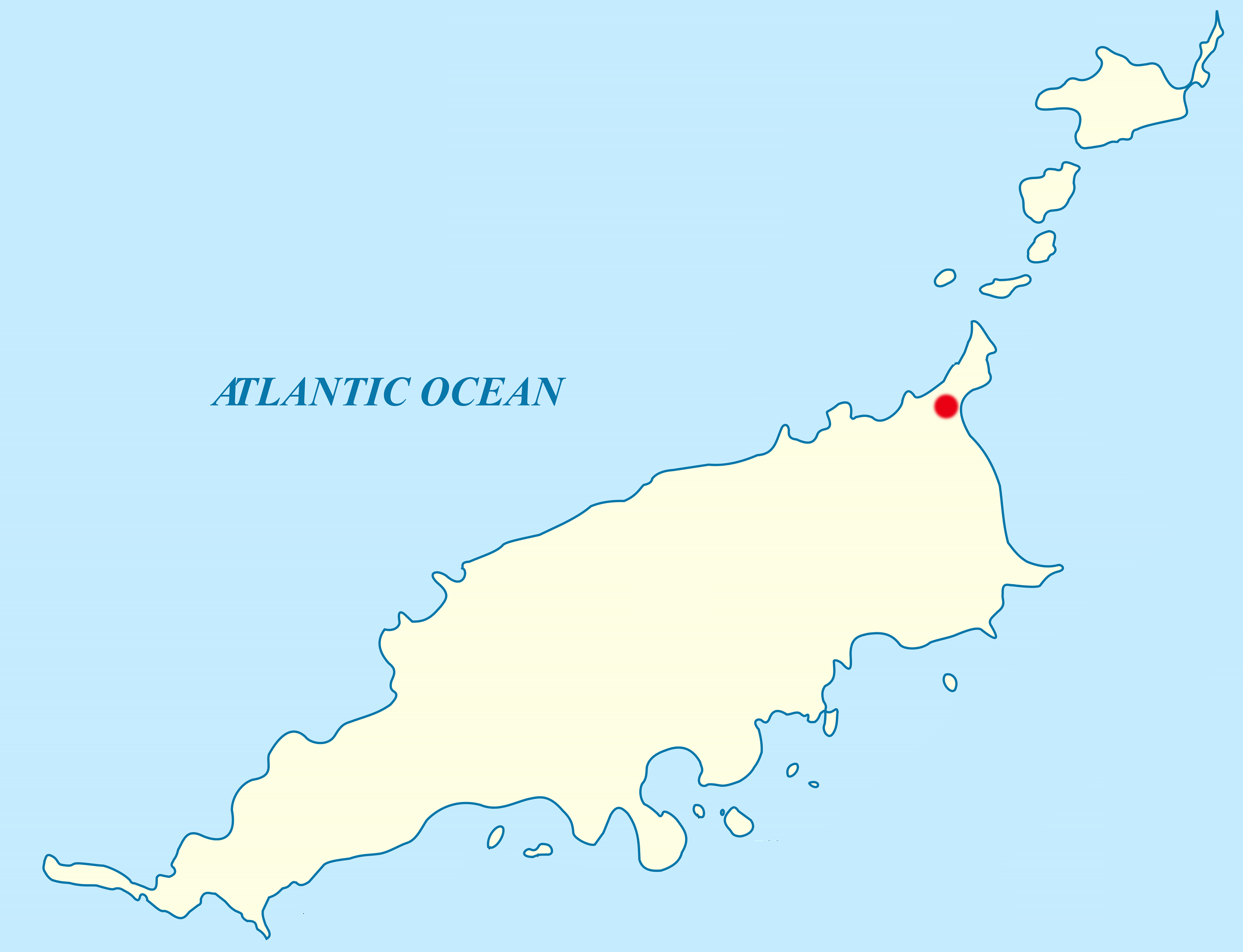
Map of the Fernando de Noronha archipelago, showing the fossil site where remains of Noronhomys have been found (in red).

The molars are high-crowned (hypsodont) and planar, with the main cusps as high as the crests connecting them, a configuration shared only with Holochilus and Carletonomys among oryzomyines. The first molars are the longest and the third molars are longer but narrower than the second molars. The molars lack many accessory ridges, including the anteroloph on the first upper molar, the posteroloph on the first and second upper molar, and the anterolophid and mesolophid on all lower molars. The first and second upper molar have a short mesoloph and the front cusp of the first lower molar, the anteroconid, encloses a large internal pit. Most of the folds between the cusps and crests are open at the margins of the molars, but two—the posteroflexid on the lower second molar and the entoflexid on the lower third molar—are closed by a wall, or cingulum, at the inner margin of the tooth. As in most oryzomyines, the upper molars all have one root on the inner (lingual) side and two on the outer (labial) side and the lower molars have a single root at the front and back of each molar; in addition, the first upper molar has another labial root and the first lower molar has a small labial and usually also a small lingual root located between the main roots.

=== Postcranial skeleton ===
The entepicondylar foramen is absent, as in all members of the Sigmodontinae; if present, as in some other rodents, this foramen (opening) perforates the distal (far) end of the humerus (upper arm bone). The pelvis and the bones of the hindlimbs are heavily built. The femoral tubercle of the acetabulum (part of the pelvis), which anchors the rectum femoris muscle, is reduced relative to Holochilus and Lundomys.

== Distribution and origin ==
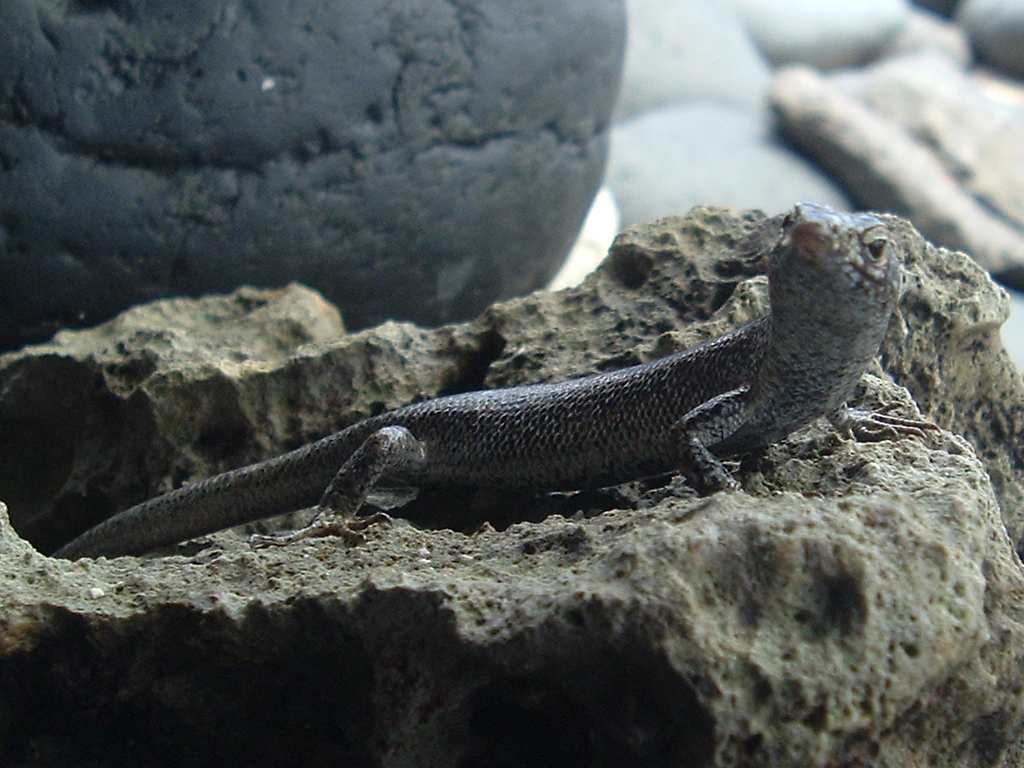
The lizard Trachylepis atlantica, which still lives on Fernando de Noronha, is one of the few other animals found on the island.

Noronhomys is known only from Fernando de Noronha, a small archipelago of volcanic origin off northeastern Brazil, consisting of a main island and several associated smaller islands. The formation of the archipelago, which has never been connected to the mainland, began about 11 million years ago; active vulcanism ceased about 2 million years ago. Remains of Noronhomys were found in association with remains of various reptiles, birds, and snails, several of which are also restricted to the archipelago, in sand dunes near the northeastern tip of the main island. The age of the deposits is unknown, but is likely late Holocene, at most a few thousand years old.

The ancestor of Noronhomys may have been a semiaquatic animal, similar to living Holochilus or Lundomys, that arrived on Fernando de Noronha by chance on a floating log. The morphology of the limb bones in Noronhomys suggests that the animal was not semiaquatic like its relatives, but terrestrial, consistent with its occurrence on a small island, where streams and pools are rare or absent.

== Extinction ==
Vespucci's account suggests that Noronhomys was common when the island was first visited, but it was not encountered by the first biological explorers of the island, who conducted their research in the late 19th century. The introduced black rat and house mouse (Mus musculus), which became very common on the island, may have driven it to extinction by directly competing for food, preying on young Noronhomys, or transmitting diseases. Other factors that may have played a role include modification of its habitat, introduction of predators such as cats (Felis catus), and predation by visiting sailors. These extinction mechanisms are common for island endemic species. As early as 1888, Henry Nicholas Ridley suggested that the rat Vespucci had seen had been driven to extinction by the introduced black rat. The International Union for Conservation of Nature lists it as "extinct".
