= Natatory fringes =

Natatory fringes are rows of stiff hairs that occur along the margins of the hindfeet in some rodents. They occur along the plantar margins and in some cases also between the toes. Among sigmodontines, a mostly South American groups, natatory fringes are present in Ichthyomyini and some Oryzomyini. Among ichthyomyines, the fringes are poorly developed in Neusticomys but well-developed in other genera, and in Rheomys mexicanus the hairs of the fringes may exceed 3 millimetres (0.12 in) in length. Amphinectomys, Holochilus, Lundomys, and Nectomys are the only oryzomyines with natatory fringes, but have them only weakly developed; one study also records them in Oryzomys. In oryzomyines, the fringes are an adaptation for a semiaquatic lifestyle that appeared convergently in the Holochilus-Lundomys and Nectomys-Amphinectomys lineages. The term was introduced in 1993 by Voss and Carleton in describing Lundomys.

== Literature cited ==
- Sánchez H., J., Ochoa G., J. and Voss, R.S. 2001. Rediscovery of Oryzomys gorgasi (Rodentia: Muridae) with notes on taxonomy and natural history (subscription required). Mammalia 65:205–214.
- Voss, R.S. 1988. Systematics and ecology of ichthyomyine rodents (Muroidea): patterns of morphological evolution in a small adaptive radiation. Bulletin of the American Museum of Natural History 188:259–493.
- Voss, R.S. and Carleton, M.D. 1993. A new genus for Hesperomys molitor Winge and Holochilus magnus Hershkovitz (Mammalia, Muridae) with an analysis of its phylogenetic relationships. American Museum Novitates 3085:1–39.
- Weksler, M. 2006. Phylogenetic relationships of oryzomyine rodents (Muroidea: Sigmodontinae): separate and combined analyses of morphological and molecular data. Bulletin of the American Museum of Natural History 296:1–149.
