= Carletonomys =

Carletonomys Temporal range: Mid Pleistocene (Ensenadan) ~1.2–0.8 Ma

Scientific classification
- Kingdom: Animalia
- Phylum: Chordata
- Class: Mammalia
- Order: Rodentia
- Family: Cricetidae
- Subfamily: Sigmodontinae
- Genus: †Carletonomys; Pardiñas, 2008
- Species: †C. cailoi

Binomial name
- †Carletonomys cailoi Pardiñas, 2008
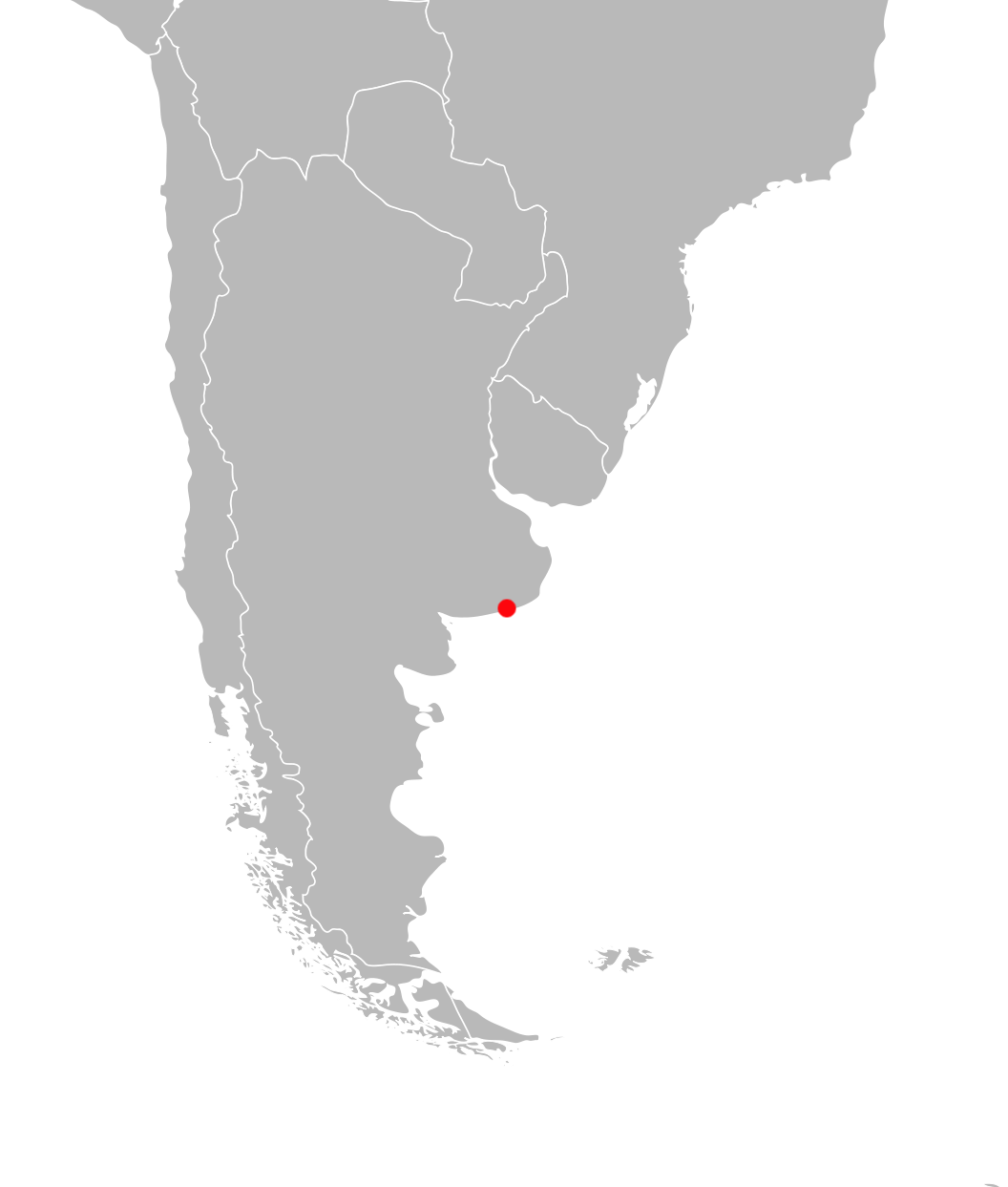

Extinct genus of rodents

Carletonomys cailoi is an extinct rodent from the Pleistocene (Ensenadan) of Buenos Aires Province, Argentina. Although known only from a single maxilla (upper jaw) with the first molar, its features are so distinctive that it is placed in its own genus, Carletonomys. Discovered in 1998 and formally described in 2008, it is part of a well-defined group of oryzomyine rodents that also includes Holochilus, Noronhomys, Lundomys, and Pseudoryzomys. This group is characterized by progressive semiaquatic specializations and a reduction in the complexity of molar morphology.

The single known molar is high-crowned (hypsodont) and flat-crowned (planar) and is distinctive in lacking the ridge that connects the front to the middle part of the molar, the anterior mure, and in the configuration of another ridge, the mesoloph. Carletonomys was probably herbivorous and lived in a wet habitat.

== Taxonomy ==
Carletonomys cailoi was discovered in 1998 in a silt deposit in San Cayetano Partido, southeastern Buenos Aires Province. The stratigraphic context suggests this locality is slightly over 1 million years old (Ensenadan South American Land Mammal Age), making Carletonomys the oldest known oryzomyine. The single known specimen is now in the collections of the Museo de La Plata. It was initially referred to the genus Noronhomys, which is currently known only from the island of Fernando de Noronha off northeastern Brazil, but in 2008 Argentinean mammalogist Ulyses Pardiñas established it as the holotype of a new genus and species of rodent in a publication in the Journal of Mammalogy. The generic name, Carletonomys, combines the name of American mammalogist Michael Carleton with the Ancient Greek μυς mys "mouse" and the specific name, cailoi, honors Argentinean biologist Carlos "Cailo" Galliari.

The fossil has a number of features that suggest a relation to a group of oryzomyine rodents that includes the South American marsh rat Holochilus, its living relatives Lundomys and Pseudoryzomys, and the extinct Noronhomys and Holochilus primigenus. They share high-crowned (hypsodont) molars and several simplifications of molar morphology, as well as other features that cannot be assessed in Carletonomys, which indicate specializations towards a semiaquatic lifestyle. It shows the most similarity to Noronhomys and Holochilus, so much so that Pardiñas considered placing it in either of these two genera, but its distinctive morphological features justify placement in a separate genus.

This group of genera encompasses only a small part of the diversity of the tribe Oryzomyini, a group of over a hundred species distributed mainly in South America, including nearby islands such as the Galápagos Islands and some of the Antilles. Oryzomyini is one of several tribes recognized within the subfamily Sigmodontinae, which encompasses hundreds of species found across South America and into southern North America. Sigmodontinae itself is the largest subfamily of the family Cricetidae, other members of which include voles, lemmings, hamsters, and deermice, all mainly from Eurasia and North America.

== Description ==
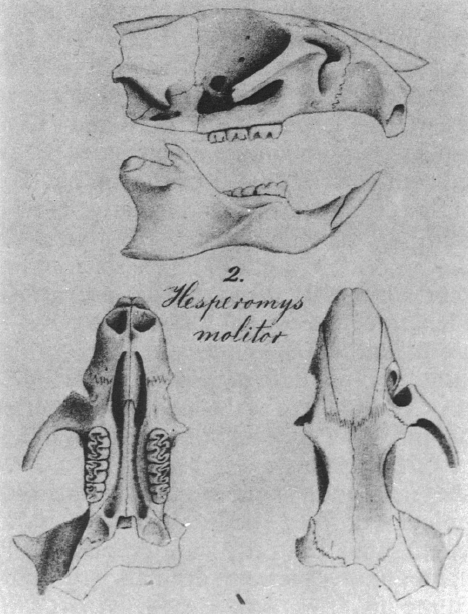
Skull of Lundomys molitor, a living rodent closely related to Carletonomys, with a mandible of a different species.

The holotype is a right maxilla (upper jaw) with the upper first molar (M1) in it. It is broken off behind the M1, but much of the front part is preserved, including the zygomatic plate, the flattened front portion of the zygomatic arch (cheekbone). The M1 is moderately worn, indicating that it is from an adult individual. With an M1 length of 3.59 mm and width of 2.53 mm, C. cailoi was one of the largest oryzomyines known, rivaled only by Lundomys and the extinct Antillean Megalomys and "Ekbletomys". The height of the M1 is 1.37 mm and it has four roots, including a large one in front, another large one on the inner (lingual) side, and two smaller ones on the outer (labial) side. The presence of a second labial root is a variable character among oryzomyines, occurring among others in Holochilus and Pseudoryzomys but not in Lundomys. The maxilla itself shows few significant characters. The back margin of the incisive foramen, which perforates the palate between the upper incisors and the molars, is not visible, suggesting that the foramen was short, as in Holochilus. The configuration of the zygomatic plate shows features that distinguish C. cailoi from some of its relatives.

The molar is plane and hypsodont: the crowns are relatively high and the main cusps are about as high as the other parts of the crown, as they are in Holochilus. Most other oryzomyines have bunodont and brachydont molars, in which the crowns are lower and the cusps are higher than the rest of the crown. As in closely related species, the front part of the molar is relatively simple, lacking an anteroloph, an additional ridge that is well-developed in most oryzomyines. A shallow anteromedian flexus is present, superficially dividing the front cusp (anterocone). Uniquely, the anterior mure, which connects the anterocone to the rest of the crown, is absent; although this structure is sometimes missing in young individuals of other oryzomyines, it usually develops as a result of wear in adults. The two cusps on the middle part of the molar, the paracone and the protocone, are broadly connected. The median mure, which connects the middle to the back pair of cusps, is attached to the back of the paracone. A complete mesoloph is present, descending from the median mure slightly behind the paracone. The configuration of the paracone–median mure–mesoloph complex is unique to Carletonomys. The two posterior cusps, the hypocone and the metacone, are connected at the back margin of the molar. Unlike in most oryzomyines, no posteroflexus is present, so that the metacone is situated directly at the back margin.

== Ecology ==
Carletonomys was found in association with remains of several other animals, including fishes, chelid turtles, frogs, birds, armadillos, and several rodents, including Reithrodon auritus, the coypu (Myocastor), both of which still live in the area, the extinct echimyid Dicolpomys, and unidentified caviids and octodontids. C. cailoi probably lived in a wetland habitat under relatively warm and moist climatic conditions. Although the limited material known permits few inferences as to the animal's natural history, it likely fed on hard plant material, as do related, morphologically similar extant species.
