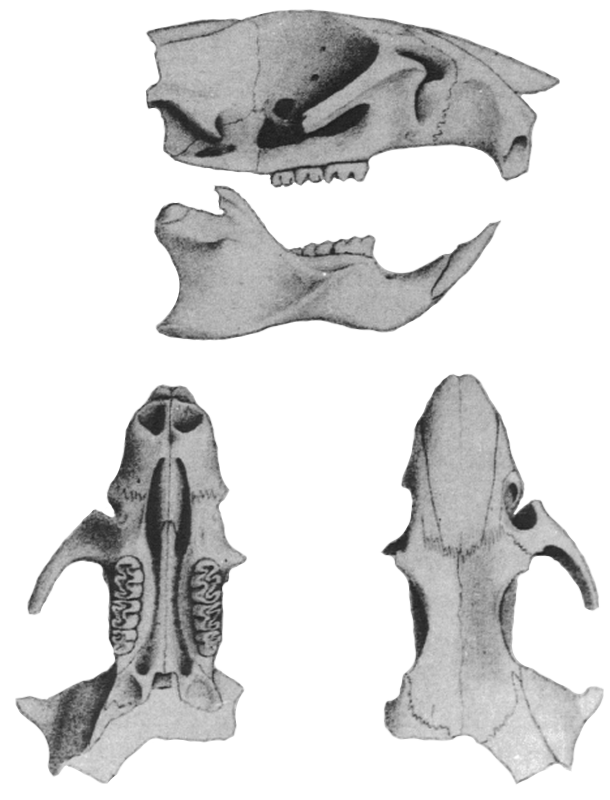
- Lectotype partial cranium of L. molitor. The illustrated mandible represents a different species.

Conservation status
- Least Concern (IUCN 3.1)

Scientific classification
- Kingdom: Animalia
- Phylum: Chordata
- Class: Mammalia
- Order: Rodentia
- Family: Cricetidae
- Subfamily: Sigmodontinae
- Tribe: Oryzomyini
- Genus: Lundomys; Voss & Carleton, 1993
- Species: L. molitor

Binomial name
- Lundomys molitor (Winge, 1887)
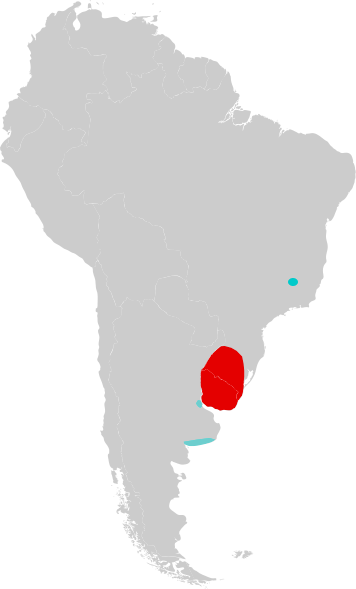
- Distribution of Lundomys molitor in South America. The current distribution is in red, and fossil records outside the current range are in blue.

Synonyms
- Hesperomys molitor Winge, 1888; Oryzomys molitor: Trouessart, 1898; Holochilus magnus Hershkovitz, 1955; Calomys molitor: Hershkovitz, 1962; Holochilus molitor: Massoia, 1980; Lundomys molitor: Voss and Carleton, 1993

= Lundomys =

Lundomys Temporal range: Late Pleistocene to Recent (Lujanian)

Species of semiaquatic rat from southeastern South America

Lundomys molitor, also known as Lund's amphibious rat or the greater marsh rat, is a semiaquatic rat species from southeastern South America.

Its distribution is now restricted to Uruguay and nearby Rio Grande do Sul, Brazil, but it previously ranged northward into Minas Gerais, Brazil, and southward into eastern Argentina. The Argentine form may have been distinct from the living form from Brazil and Uruguay. L. molitor is a large rodent, with the head and body length averaging 193 mm (7.6 in), characterized by a long tail, large hindfeet, and long and dense fur. It builds nests above the water, supported by reeds, and it is not currently threatened.

Its external morphology is similar to that of Holochilus brasiliensis, and over the course of its complex taxonomic history it has been confused with that species, but other features support its placement in a distinct genus, Lundomys. Within the family Cricetidae and subfamily Sigmodontinae, it is a member of a group of specialized oryzomyine rodents that also includes Holochilus, Noronhomys, Carletonomys, and Pseudoryzomys.

== Taxonomy ==
Lundomys molitor was first described in 1888 by Danish zoologist Herluf Winge, who reviewed the materials Peter Wilhelm Lund had collected in the caves of Lagoa Santa, Minas Gerais, Brazil. Winge used four specimens for his description, including two skull fragments and an isolated maxilla (upper jaw) from the cave chamber Lapa da Escrivania Nr. 5 and a mandible (lower jaw) from Lapa da Serra das Abelhas, but the latter later turned out to be from a different species, probably Gyldenstolpia fronto. Lund named the animal Hesperomys molitor and placed it in the same genus (Hesperomys) as what is now Pseudoryzomys simplex and two species of Calomys. Subsequently, it was rarely mentioned in the literature on South American rodents; those authors who did mention it placed it in either Oryzomys or Calomys.

In 1926, American zoologist Colin Campbell Sanborn collected some rodents in Uruguay, which he identified as Holochilus vulpinus (currently Holochilus brasiliensis) in his 1929 report on the collection. When his successor at the Field Museum of Natural History, Philip Hershkovitz, reviewed Holochilus in 1955, he recognized that the series from Uruguay contained two species, one close to the forms of Holochilus found across much of South America, and another unique to Uruguay and southern Brazil; he named the latter as a new species, Holochilus magnus. Hershkovitz identified Holochilus as one of the members of a "sigmodont" group of American rodents, also including Sigmodon, Reithrodon, and Neotomys, on the basis of its flat-crowned molars, which are lophodont (the crown consists of transverse ridges). In 1981, H. magnus was also recognized in the Late Pleistocene of Buenos Aires Province, Argentina, and in 1982 it was recorded from Rio Grande do Sul in southern Brazil.

In a 1980 article, Argentine zoologist Elio Massoia recognized the resemblance between Winge's Hesperomys molitor and Hershkovitz's Holochilus magnus, and recommended that the former be reclassified as a species of Holochilus, Holochilus molitor. When American zoologists Voss and Carleton restudied Winge's material in a 1993 paper, they were unable to find any consistent differences between the two and accordingly considered them to pertain to the same species. In addition, they reviewed the differences between this species and other Holochilus and concluded that these were significant enough to place the former in a distinct genus, which they named Lundomys after Lund, who had collected the original material. Since then, the species has been known as Lundomys molitor.

In the same paper in which they described Lundomys, Voss and Carleton also, for the first time, diagnosed the tribe Oryzomyini in a phylogenetically valid way. Previously, Oryzomyini had been a somewhat loosely defined group defined among others by a long palate and the presence of a crest known as the mesoloph on the upper molars and mesolophid on the lower molars; this crest is absent or reduced in Holochilus and Lundomys. Voss and Carleton recognized five synapomorphies for the group, all of which are shared by Lundomys; the placement in Oryzomyini of Lundomys and of three other genera—Holochilus, Pseudoryzomys, and Zygodontomys—which also lack complete mesoloph(id)s has been universally supported since.

Voss and Carleton had found some support for a close relationship between Holochilus, Lundomys, and Pseudoryzomys within Oryzomyini. In subsequent years, the related species Holochilus primigenus and Noronhomys vespuccii were discovered, providing additional evidence for this grouping. The allocation of the former, which is similar to Lundomys in features of the dentition, to Holochilus is controversial, and placement as a second species of Lundomys has been suggested as an alternative. A comprehensive phylogenetic analysis of oryzomyines by Marcelo Weksler, published in 2006, supported a close relationship among Lundomys, Holochilus, and Pseudoryzomys; the other species of the group were not included. Data from the sequence of the IRBP gene supported a closer relationship between Holochilus and Pseudoryzomys, with Lundomys more distantly related, but morphological data placed Holochilus and Lundomys closer together, as did the combined analysis of both morphological and IRPB data. Subsequently, Carletonomys cailoi was described as an additional relative of Holochilus and Lundomys.

== Description ==
Lundomys molitor is among the largest living oryzomyines, rivaled only by some large forms of Holochilus and Nectomys, but it is substantially smaller than some of the recently extinct Antillean species, such as "Ekbletomys hypenemus" and Megalomys desmarestii. Unlike in Holochilus brasiliensis, which occurs in the same area, the tail is longer than the head and body. It is sparsely haired and dark, and there is no difference in color between the upper and lower side. The coat, which is long, dense, and soft, is yellow–brown at the sides, but becomes darker on the upperparts and lighter on the underparts. The large hindfeet are characterized by conspicuous interdigital webbing, but they lack tufts of hair on the digits and several of the pads are reduced. As in some other semiaquatic oryzomyines, fringes of hair are present along the plantar margins and between some of the digits. The forefeet also lack tufts on the digits and show very long claws, a character unique among oryzomyines. The female has four pairs of teats, and the gall bladder is absent, both important characters of oryzomyines. The head and body length is 160 to 230 mm (6.3 to 9.1 in), averaging 193 mm (7.6 in), the tail length is 195 to 255 mm (7.68 to 10.04 mm), averaging 235 mm (9.3 in), and the length of the hindfoot is 58 to 68 mm (2.3 to 2.7 in), averaging 62 mm (2.4 in). (Note: Measurements for head and body length and tail length are from 10 specimens, and those for hindfoot length are from 12 specimens, all from Uruguay.)

The front part of the skull is notably broad. As in Holochilus, the zygomatic plate, the flattened front portion of the cheek bone, is expansive and produced into a spinous process at the anterior margin. The jugal bone is small, but less reduced than in Holochilus. The interorbital region of the skull is narrow and flanked by high beads. The incisive foramina, which perforate the palate between the incisors and the upper molars, are long, extending between the molars. The palate itself is also long, extending beyond the posterior margin of the maxillary bones, and it is perforated near the third molars by conspicuous posterolateral palatal pits. As in all oryzomyines, the squamosal bone lacks a suspensory process that contacts the tegmen tympani, the roof of the tympanic cavity, but Lundomys is unusual in that the squamosal and the tegmen tympani usually overlap when viewed from the side. In the mandible, the angular and coronoid processes are less well-developed than in Holochilus. The capsular process of the lower incisor, a slight raising of the mandibular bone at the back end of the incisor, near the coronoid process, is small. The two masseteric ridges, to which some of the chewing muscles are attached, are entirely separate, joining only at their anterior edges, which are located below the first molar.

The molars are slightly more high-crowned (hypsodont) than in most oryzomyines, and many of the accessory crests are reduced, but they are sharply distinct from the highly derived, hypsodont molars of Holochilus. The main cusps are located opposite each other and have rounded edges. The enamel folds do not extend past the midlines of the molars. The mesoloph, an accessory crest on the upper molars that is usually well-developed in oryzomyines, is present but short on the first and second upper molar; it is much more reduced in Holochilus and Pseudoryzomys. The corresponding structure on the lower molars, the mesolophid, is present on the first and second molars in Lundomys, but absent in both Holochilus and Pseudoryzomys. Another accessory crest, the anteroloph, is present, though small, on the first upper molar in Lundomys, but entirely absent in both other genera. As in Holochilus and Pseudoryzomys, the anterior cusp on the first lower molar, the anteroconid, contains a deep pit. Each of the three upper molars has three roots; unlike in both Holochilus and Pseudoryzomys, the first upper molar lacks an accessory fourth root. The first lower molar has four roots, including two small accessory roots located between larger anterior and posterior roots. The second molar has either two or three roots, with the anterior root split into two smaller roots in some specimens.

The karyotype contains 52 chromosomes with a total of 58 major arms (2n = 52, FN = 58). The non-sex chromosomes (autosomes) are mostly acrocentric, having a long and a short arm, or telocentric, having only one arm, but there are also three large metacentric pairs, which have two major arms, and a small metacentric pair. The Y chromosome is metacentric and the X chromosome is variable, ranging from nearly metacentric to acrocentric in five specimens studied.

== Distribution and ecology ==
Lundomys molitor has been found as a living animal only in Uruguay and nearby Rio Grande do Sul; records of live specimens from eastern Argentina and Lagoa Santa, Minas Gerais, have not been confirmed. It is rarely encountered, and has been collected in only one location in Rio Grande do Sul, but this may be due to insufficient efforts to locate it, rather than genuine rarity. Its distribution is generally limited to areas with mean winter temperatures over 12 °C (54 °F), mean annual temperatures over 18 °C (64 °F), annual rainfall over 1,100 mm (43 in), and a long rainy season averaging over 200 days. It is usually found in swamps or near streams.

Pleistocene fossils have been found throughout its current range and beyond it. In Uruguay and Rio Grande do Sul, the Lujanian (Late Pleistocene to Early Holocene) Sopas Formation has yielded remains of L. molitor, in addition to such other mammals as the extinct saber-toothed cat Smilodon populator and species of Glyptodon, Macrauchenia, and Toxodon. The type locality, Lagoa Santa, lies far northeast of the nearest record of live L. molitor; there, it is known only from three skull fragments from a cave known as Laga da Escrivania Nr. 5. This cave also contains numerous remains of members of the extinct South American megafauna, such as ground sloths, litopternans, gomphotheres, and glyptodonts, in addition to 16 species of cricetid rodents, but it is not certain that all remains from this cave are from the same age.

Remains of Lundomys have been found at six Pleistocene localities in Buenos Aires Province, Argentina, which suggests a warm and humid paleoclimate there. The oldest deposits, at Bajo San José, date to Marine Isotopic Stage 11, about 420,000 to 360,000 years ago, while younger specimens from other localities are as little as 30,000 years old. The younger Argentine Lundomys specimens are subtly distinct from living Lundomys in some features of the first lower molar and may represent a distinct species. One lower first molar of this form has length 3.28 mm. Because the Bajo San José material does not contain lower first molars, it is impossible to determine whether this material also pertains to the later Argentine Lundomys form. The morphology of the upper and lower jaw precludes an identification as Holochilus primigenus, a fossil species with molar traits almost identical to those of Lundomys. The length of the upper toothrow of one specimen from this locality is 8.50 mm (0.335 in) and the length of the upper first molar is 3.48 mm (0.137 in), slightly smaller than in living Lundomys, which ranges from 3.56 to 3.64 mm (0.140 to 0.143 in) in four specimens

== Natural history ==
Lundomys molitor is semiaquatic in habits, spending much of its time in the water, and is active during the night. An excellent swimmer, it is even more specialized for swimming than is Holochilus. It builds a spherical nest among reeds in up to 1.5 m (4.9 ft) deep water, usually about 20 cm (8 in) above the water. The material for the nest, which is 25 to 30 cm (10 to 12 in) in diameter and 9 to 11 cm (about 4 in) in height, comes from the surrounding reeds. Its wall consists of three layers, surrounding a central chamber, which is connected to the water by a ramp, also composed of reeds. Nests built by members of the related genus Holochilus are similar in many details. Several dissected stomachs contained green plant material, suggesting that it is herbivorous, like Holochilus. A female caught in April was pregnant with three embryos, which were about 12 mm (0.47 in) long. The mites Gigantolaelaps wolffsohni and Amblyomma dubitatum have been found on specimens of L. molitor in Uruguay. Other rodents found in association with it include Scapteromys tumidus, Oligoryzomys nigripes, Reithrodon auritus, Akodon azarae, Oxymycterus nasutus, and Holochilus brasiliensis.

== Conservation status ==
The species' conservation status is currently assessed as "least concern" by the International Union for Conservation of Nature, reflecting a relatively wide distribution and the absence of evidence for a decline in populations. Several of the areas where it occurs are protected, but the destruction of its habitat may pose a threat to its continued existence.

== Literature cited ==
- Bonvicino, C.R., Oliveira, J.A. and D'Andrea, P.S. 2008. Guia dos Roedores do Brasil, com chaves para gêneros baseadas em characteres externos. Série de Manuais Técnicos 11:1–120. Rio de Janeiro: Centro Pan-Americano de Febre Aftosa – OPAS/OMS (in Portuguese).
- Carleton, M.D. and Olson, S.L. 1999. Amerigo Vespucci and the rat of Fernando de Noronha: a new genus and species of Rodentia (Muridae, Sigmodontinae) from a volcanic island off Brazil's continental shelf. American Museum Novitates 3256:1–59.
- Duff, A. and Lawson, A. 2004. Mammals of the World: A checklist. New Haven: A & C Black, 312 pp. ISBN 0-7136-6021-X.
- Freitas, T.R.O., Mattevi, M.S., Oliveira, L.F.B., Souza, M.J., Yonenaga-Yassuda, Y. and Salzano, F.M. 1983. Chromosome relationships in three representatives of the genus Holochilus (Rodentia, Cricetidae) from Brazil (subscription required). Genetica 61:13–20.
- Gonzalez, E.; D'elia, G.; Pardinas, U. (2017) [errata version of 2016 assessment]. "Lundomys molitor". IUCN Red List of Threatened Species. 2016 e.T10219A115096149. doi:10.2305/IUCN.UK.2016-3.RLTS.T10219A22328078.en.
- Hershkovitz, P.M. 1955. South American marsh rats, genus Holochilus, with a summary of sigmodont rodents. Fieldiana Zoology 37:619–673.
- Lareschi, M., Gettinger, D., Venzal, J.M., Arzua, M., Nieri-Bastos, F.A., Barros-Battesti, D.M. and Gonzalez, E.M. 2006. Primer registro de ácaros (Gamasida: Laelapidae) parásitos de roedores silvestres en Uruguay, con nuevos registros de hospedadores. Neotropical Entomology 35(5):596–601 (in Spanish).
- Musser, G. G.; Carleton, M. D. (2005). "Superfamily Muroidea". In Wilson, D. E.; Reeder, D. M. (eds.). Mammal Species of the World: A Taxonomic and Geographic Reference (3rd ed.). Johns Hopkins University Press. p. 1124. ISBN 978-0-8018-8221-0. OCLC 62265494.
- Nava, S., Venzal, J.M., Labruna, M.B., Mastropaolo, M., González, E.M., Mangold, A.J. and Guglielmone, A.A. 2010. Hosts, distribution and genetic divergence (16S rDNA) of Amblyomma dubitatum (Acari: Ixodidae) (subscription required). Experimental and Applied Acarology 51(4):335–351.
- Oliveira, É.V. and Kerber, L. 2009. Paleontologia e aspectos geológicos das sucessões do final do Neógeno no sudoeste do Rio Grande do Sul, Brasil. Gaea 5(1):21–34 (in Spanish).
- Pardiñas, U.F.J. 2008. A new genus of oryzomyine rodent (Cricetidae: Sigmodontinae) from the Pleistocene of Argentina (subscription required). Journal of Mammalogy 89(5):1270–1278.
- Pardiñas, U.F.J. and Deschamps, C. 1996. Sigmodontinos (Mammalia, Rodentia) Pleistocenicos del sudoeste de la provincia de Buenos Aires (Argentina): Aspectos sistematicos, paleozoogeograficos y paleoambientales. Estudios Geológicos 52:367–379 (in Spanish).
- Pardiñas, U.F.J. and Lezcano, M.J. 1995. Cricetidos (Mammalia: Rodentia) del Pleistoceno tardio del nordeste de la provincia de Buenos Aires (Argentina). Aspectos sistematicos y paleoambientales. Ameghiniana 32(3):249–265 (in Spanish).
- Pardiñas, U.F.J., D'Elía, G. and Teta, P. 2008. Una introducción a los mayores sigmodontinos vivientes: Revisión de Kunsia Hershkovitz, 1966 y descripción de un nuevo género (Rodentia: Cricetidae). Arquivos do Museu Nacional 66(3–4):509–594.
- Ray, C.E. 1962. The Oryzomyine Rodents of the Antillean Subregion. Doctor of Philosophy thesis, Harvard University, 211 pp.
- Steppan, S.J. 1996. A new species of Holochilus (Rodentia: Sigmodontinae) from the Middle Pleistocene of Bolivia and its phylogenetic significance (subscription required). Journal of Vertebrate Paleontology 16(3):522–530.
- Teta, P. and Pardiñas, U.F.J. 2006. "Pleistocene record of marsh rats of the genus Lundomys in southern South America: Paleoclimatic significance". Current Research in the Pleistocene 23:179–181.
- Ubilla, M., Perea, D., Aguilar, C.G. and Lorenzo, N. 2004. Late Pleistocene vertebrates from northern Uruguay: tools for biostratigraphic, climatic and environmental reconstruction (subscription required). Quaternary International 114:129–142.
- Voss, R.S. and Carleton, M.D. 1993. A new genus for Hesperomys molitor Winge and Holochilus magnus Hershkovitz (Mammalia, Muridae) with an analysis of its phylogenetic relationships. American Museum Novitates 3085:1–39.
- Voss, R.S. and Myers, P. 1991. Pseudoryzomys simplex (Rodentia: Muridae) and the significance of Lund's collections from the caves of Lagoa Santa, Brazil. Bulletin of the American Museum of Natural History 206:414–432.
- Weksler, M. 2006. Phylogenetic relationships of oryzomyine rodents (Muroidea: Sigmodontinae): separate and combined analyses of morphological and molecular data. Bulletin of the American Museum of Natural History 296:1–149.
