= Reigomys =

Reigomys Temporal range: Late Pleistocene (Ensenadan) ~1.0–0.7 Ma

Scientific classification
- Kingdom: Animalia
- Phylum: Chordata
- Class: Mammalia
- Order: Rodentia
- Family: Cricetidae
- Subfamily: Sigmodontinae
- Tribe: Oryzomyini
- Genus: †Reigomys; Machado et al., 2014
- Species: †R. primigenus

Binomial name
- †Reigomys primigenus (Steppan 1996)

Extinct genus of rodents

Reigomys primigenus is an extinct oryzomyine rodent known from Pleistocene deposits in Tarija Department, southeastern Bolivia. It is known from a number of isolated jaws and molars which show that its molars were almost identical to those of the living Lundomys. On the other hand, the animal possesses a number of derived traits of the palate which document a closer relationship to living Holochilus, the genus of South American marsh rats, and for this reason it was placed in the genus Holochilus when it was first described in 1996. The subsequent discoveries of Noronhomys and Carletonomys, which may be more closely related to extant Holochilus than H. primigenus is, have cast its placement in Holochilus into doubt, and it was ultimately made the type species of a separate genus, Reigomys.

== Taxonomy ==
Material of Reigomys primigenus was collected in 1924 and 1927 by Elmer Riggs of the Field Museum of Natural History, but the animal was not described until 1996, when Scott Steppan formally named it as a new species of the genus Holochilus and diagnosed it, contrasting it to related species. The material Riggs collected includes nine mandibles, three maxillae, and five isolated molars. The specific name Steppan gave to the animal, primigenus, means "primitive" in Latin and refers to the primitive features of the animal when compared to its relatives Holochilus and Lundomys. In order to determine the relationships of his new species, Steppan carried out a cladistic analysis, in which he also included the oryzomyines Holochilus, Lundomys, Pseudoryzomys, and Cerradomys, as well as the non-oryzomyine Sigmodon. His results supported a close relation between R. primigenus and extant Holochilus, with Lundomys and Pseudoryzomys more distantly related.

In 1999, another rodent from the same group was described: Noronhomys, a recently extinct species from the Brazilian island of Fernando de Noronha. Michael Carleton and Storrs Olson, who described the animal, argued that Holochilus primigenus was probably outside the clade of Noronhomys and extant Holochilus and that H. primigenus should probably be excluded from the genus. When Ulyses Pardiñas described another extinct rodent from this group, Carletonomys from the Pleistocene of Argentina, he suggested that H. primigenus should be placed in its own genus because of its mosaic of Holochilus- and Lundomys-like features.

The phylogenetic analysis conducted by Machado et al. (2014) confirmed that living members of the genus Holochilus are more closely related to Noronhomys and Carletonomys than to H. primigenus. The authors moved H. primigenus to its own genus, which they named Reigomys.

== Description ==
Reigomys primigenus was a large rat, though smaller than both Lundomys and living Holochilus, characterized by an S-shaped ("sigmodont") crown on the third lower molar. Features of the molars are nearly indistinguishable from those of Lundomys and include cusps located opposite each other, enamel valleys that barely reach the midline of the molars, and short mesolophs and mesolophids (accessory crests). Other notable features include a robust mandible (lower jaw) with a steeply rising coronoid process, short incisive foramina (perforations of the front part of the palate) that barely extend between the first molars, and a short bony palate that hardly extends beyonds the third molars, all of which are shared with extant species of Holochilus to the exclusion of Lundomys. Also unlike in Lundomys, there is an additional small root present at the labial (outer) side of the first upper molar. In eight specimens that could be measured, the length of the lower toothrow is 6.79 to 7.58 mm, averaging 7.28 mm; the first lower molar is 2.62 to 3.08 mm long, averaging 2.89 mm, and 1.75 to 1.93 mm broad, averaging 1.85 mm in seven measured teeth; the only preserved complete upper toothrow is 6.64 mm long; and the first upper molar is 2.63 to 2.70 mm long and 2.03 mm broad in two specimens.

== Distribution and ecology ==
Remains of Reigomys primigenus come from several localities in river sediments of the Tarija Formation in Tarija Department, which have been paleomagnetically dated to about 0.7 to 1.0 million years ago (chrons Clr.ln to early Cln, Ensenadan South American land mammal age). Other sigmodontine rodents found there include Andinomys, Calomys, Kunsia, Nectomys, Oxymycterus, Phyllotis, and another akodontine, probably Akodon, Necromys, or a related genus. The deposits were deposited by a river and the paleoenvironment was probably a floodplain or channel. Reigomys primigenus is not known from any other localities and is considered to be extinct.
