= Amphinectomys =

Conservation status
- Data Deficient (IUCN 3.1)

Scientific classification
- Kingdom: Animalia
- Phylum: Chordata
- Class: Mammalia
- Infraclass: Placentalia
- Order: Rodentia
- Family: Cricetidae
- Subfamily: Sigmodontinae
- Tribe: Oryzomyini
- Genus: Amphinectomys; Malygin, 1994
- Species: A. savamis

Binomial name
- Amphinectomys savamis Malygin, 1994

Species of rodent

Amphinectomys savamis, also known as the Ucayali water rat or amphibious rat, is a rodent from the Peruvian Amazon. It is placed as the only member of genus Amphinectomys in the tribe Oryzomyini of family Cricetidae. It is similar to Nectomys, but its discoverers considered it to be different enough (with more expansive interdigital webbing and a significantly broader interorbital region) to require its own genus. When it was described as a new genus in 1994, knowledge of the variation within Nectomys was much more limited than it is now, and it has been suggested that the status of the taxon be re-examined considering this new information. The species's karyotype, 2n = 52, falls within the known range of Nectomys (2n = 38 - 59).

== Literature cited ==
- Duff, A. and Lawson, A. 2004. Mammals of the World: A checklist. New Haven, Connecticut: Yale University Press, 312 pp. ISBN 0-7136-6021-X
- Malygin, V.M., Aniskin, V.M., Isaev, S.I. and Milishnikov, A.N. 1994. Amphinectomys savamis Malygin Gen. et sp. n., a new species and a new genus of water rat (Cricetidae, Rodentia) from Peruvian Amazonia. Zoologicheskii Zhurnal 73:195-208.
