= Zygomatic plate =

Bony plate in rodent anatomy

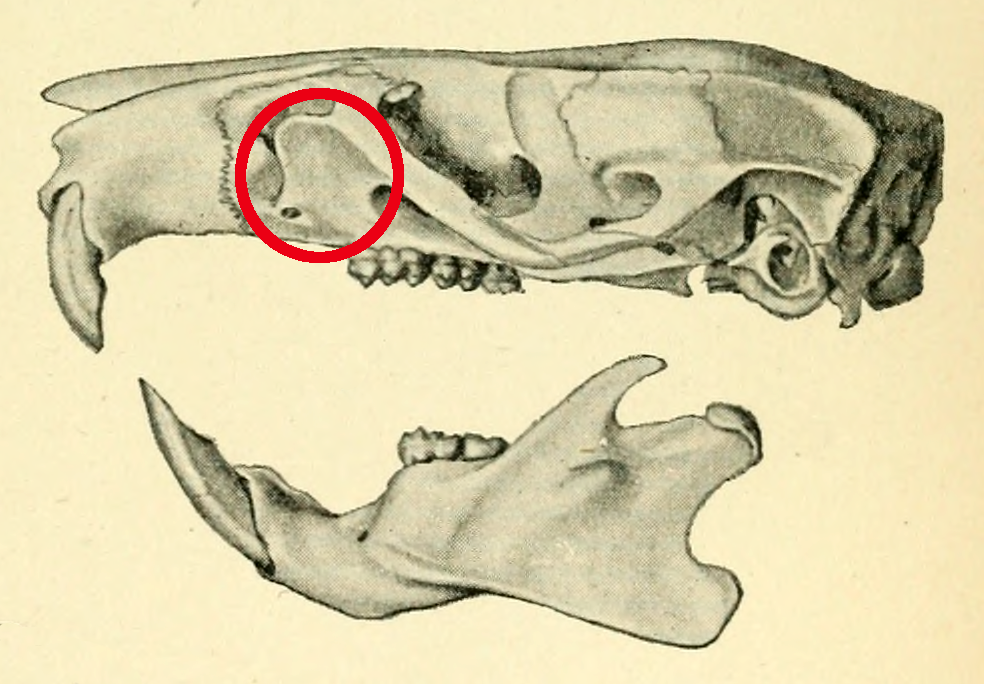
Skull of Rattus macleari with the left zygomatic plate indicated.

In rodent anatomy, the zygomatic plate is a bony plate derived from the flattened front part of the zygomatic arch (cheekbone). At the back, it connects to the front (maxillary) root of the zygomatic arch, and at the top it is connected to the rest of the skull via the antorbital bridge. It is part of the maxillary bone, or upper jaw, which also contains the upper cheekteeth. Primitively, rodents have a nearly horizontal zygomatic plate. In association with specializations in zygomasseteric system, several distinct morphologies have developed across the order.

The term is also used for an analogous structure in some South American typotheres, including Pseudotypotherium and Medistylus.

== Function ==
The zygomatic plate serves to resist muscular tension resulting from the contraction of the incisors by the anterior deep masseter muscle; thus, rodents which pulverize hard food with the incisors tend to have broader zygomatic plates than those that rather use their molars for this purpose.

== Hystricomorpha ==
The members of this large and diverse suborder have a narrow, low zygomatic plate.

== Sciuromorpha ==
The suborder Sciuromorpha includes three families. Squirrels (family Sciuridae) tend to have broad zygomatic plate that extend above the infraorbital foramen. The mountain beaver (Aplodontia rufa), the only surviving member of its family, retains the primitive narrow and low plate. The dormice (Gliridae) have broad, high zygomatic plates, except for Graphiurus, which has a lower plate.

== Castorimorpha ==
Members of the suborder Castorimorpha, which includes the beavers, pocket gophers, and pocket mice, tend to have broad zygomatic plate that extend above the infraorbital foramen.

== Anomaluromorpha ==
Anomaluromorpha is a small suborder, containing only two families. Anomaluridae have a low and narrow zygomatic plate. Members of the subfamily Idiurinae are atypical in having the zygomatic plate extended forward nearly to the incisors. The condition in the springhaas (Pedetes) is similar.

== Myomorpha ==
Myomorpha is the largest suborder of rodents. In the most numerous subgroup, the Muroidea (including all living families except Dipodidae), the zygomatic plate is generally broad and tilted upwards. Muroids may have the plate extending in front of the front (maxillary) root of the actual zygomatic arch, creating a zygomatic notch. In some, the plate extends at the front into a spinous process, the zygomatic spine.

=== Dipodidae ===
Members of the family Dipodidae, which have hystricomorphous zygomasseteric morphology, have nearly horizontal, narrow zygomatic plates.

=== Platacanthomyidae ===
Members of the small family Platacanthomyidae have a relatively narrow zygomatic plate.

=== Spalacidae ===
The fossorially specialized family Spalacidae shows peculiarities in the condition of the zygomatic plate. In Tachyoryctes and the Rhizomyinae, it is tilted upward and fused to the sides of the snout (rostrum). In the Spalacinae and Myospalacinae, on the other hand, the plate is tilted downward into an almost horizontal position.

=== Calomyscidae ===
The mouse-like hamster (Calomyscus), the only member of its family, has a straight front margin on the zygomatic plate.

=== Nesomyidae ===
The family Nesomyidae is restricted to Africa.

Dendromus has a narrow zygomatic plate, as do Steatomys and Prionomys.

Brachyuromys has an arvicoline-like high zygomatic plate. In Eliurus, the front border of the plate is straight. Nesomys has a low zygomatic plate. In Hypogeomys, it is broad, but rather low.

=== Muridae ===
Muridae is the order's largest family, and contains several subfamilies.

Deomys, a member of the Deomyinae, has an unusually low zygomatic plate, as does Lophuromys, a member of the same subfamily.

Most members of the subfamily Murinae, the Old World rats and mice, have a fairly broad zygomatic plate with a well-developed zygomatic notch. A zygomatic spine is developed in some Australian genera, including Notomys and some Pseudomys. Except for Xeromys, Hydromys and related genera ("hydromyines") have a narrow plate, lacking the notch, as does Hyomys, Macruromys, Crunomys, and Rhynchomys. The Philippine Batomys, Carpomys, and Crateromys have well-developed zygomatic plates, reminiscent of those in Arvicolinae. Phloeomys has a broad zygomatic plate.

=== Cricetidae ===
The family Cricetidae is the order's second largest, containing several subfamilies and hundreds of species.

The subfamily Arvicolinae, the voles and lemmings, has the zygomatic plate tilted upwards very strongly.

In the subfamily Tylomyinae, Nyctomys has a narrow zygomatic plate.

Among members of the Neotominae, Baiomys, Reithrodontomys, Onychomys, and Peromyscus has a narrow zygomatic plate.

Members of the subfamily Sigmodontinae, which includes a number of tribes, usually have the antorbital bridge below the upper surface of the skull. Most have a zygomatic notch. The extent of the zygomatic plate at the back is also variable within Sigmodontinae, with some having the plate extending back to the level of the first upper molar and others having shorter plates.

Members of the semiaquatic tribe Ichthyomyini are unique among the Sigmodontinae in lacking the zygomatic notch. In ichthyomyines, the development of the zygomatic plate is correlated with the development of the teeth: those species with large molars and small incisors, including species of Anotomys and Rheomys, have slender plates that do not extend back to the first molars, whereas those with larger incisors and smaller molars, including some Ichthyomys and Neusticomys, have broader zygomatic plates that do reach the level of the first molars.

The genus Sigmodon, which is classified in its own tribe, has a broad zygomatic plate and a zygomatic spine. Relative width of the zygomatic plate can distinguish some species of Sigmodon.

Most members of the tribe Phyllotini have the antorbital bridge located higher than is usual in Sigmodontinae (Calomys and Andalgalomys show the normal sigmodontine condition). A similar condition characterizes Euneomys, Neotomys, Reithrodon, which are no longer considered phyllotines, but to an even larger extent than in most actual phyllotines; in Euneomys, the antorbital bridge is inserted on the upper surface of the skull. Most phyllotines have zygomatic spines, but the structure is more well-developed in Reithrodon. The zygomatic plate not extending backwards to the first molars is a diagnostic character of phyllotines.

Most thomasomyines lack a well-developed zygomatic notch. The genus Rhipidomys has a narrow zygomatic plate, no zygomatic spine and only a narrow notch. Thomasomys shares a narrow zygomatic plate.

In the Akodontini, Oxymycterus and Lenoxus have a low zygomatic plate, similar to that of Lophuromys. Scapteromys shares a low plate. In Akodon, the plate is narrow, as in many others akodontine; this is extremely so in Blarinomys.

The tribe Abrotrichini is characterized by a narrow zygomatic plate, without an extension at the upper border.

In the tribe Oryzomyini, the configuration of the zygomatic plate is variable. Most have a well-developed zygomatic notch. In the three related genera Holochilus, Pseudoryzomys, and Lundomys, this extension has further developed into a zygomatic spine. In contrast, Microryzomys, Oreoryzomys, Oecomys, Scolomys, and Sigmodontomys aphrastus lack a well-defined notch and do not have the plate extending appreciably in front of the root of the zygomatic arch. The zygomatic plate extending back to the level of the upper first molar is a putative synapomorphy of Clade C within Oryzomyini.

The sigmodontine Juliomys pictipes has an almost vertical zygomatic plate.

== Literature cited ==
- Carleton, M.D.; Musser, G.G. (2005). "Order Rodentia". In Wilson, D.E.; Reeder, D.M. (eds.). Mammal Species of the World: a taxonomic and geographic reference (3rd ed.). Baltimore: The Johns Hopkins University Press. pp. 745–752. ISBN 978-0-8018-8221-0. 2 vols., 2142 pp.
- D'Elía, G.; Pardiñas, U.F.J.; Teta, P.; Patton, J.L (2007). "Definition and diagnosis of a new tribe of sigmodontine rodents (Cricetidae: Sigmodontinae), and a revised classification of the subfamily". Gayana. 71 (2): 187–194. doi:10.4067/s0717-65382007000200007.
- Ellerman, J.R (1940). The families and genera of living rodents. Volume I. Rodents other than Muridae. London: Printed by order of the Trustees of the British Museum. 689 pp.
- Ellerman, J.R. (1941). The families and genera of living rodents. Volume II. Family Muridae. London: Printed by order of the Trustees of the British Museum. 690 pp.
- Jenkins, P.D.; Kilpatrick, C.W.; Robinson, M.F; Timmins, R.J. (2005). "Morphological and molecular investigations of a new family, genus and species of rodent (Mammalia: Rodentia: Hystricognatha) from Lao PDR". Systematics and Biodiversity. 2 (4): 419–454. doi:10.1017/S1477200004001549. S2CID 86411689.
- Miller, G.S. Jr.; Gidley, J.W. (1918). "Synopsis of the supergeneric groups of rodents". Journal of the Washington Academy of Sciences. 8: 431–448. doi:10.5962/bhl.part.6490.
- Musser, G.G.; Carleton, M.D. (2005). "Superfamily Muroidea". In Wilson, D.E.; Reeder, D.M. (eds.). Mammal Species of the World: a taxonomic and geographic reference (3rd ed.). Baltimore: The Johns Hopkins University Press. pp. 894–1531. ISBN 978-0-8018-8221-0. 2 vols., 2142 pp.
- Osgood, W.H. (1933). "Two new rodents from Argentina". Fieldiana Zoology. 20 (3): 11–14.
- Patterson, B. (1934). Trachytherus, a typotherid from the Deseado beds of Patagonia. Geological Series. Vol. 6. Field Museum of Natural History. pp. 91–111.
- Patton, J.L.; da Silva, M.N.F.; Malcolm, J.R. (2000). "Mammals of the Rio Juruá and the evolutionary and ecological diversification of Amazonia". Bulletin of the American Museum of Natural History. 244: 1–306. doi:10.1206/0003-0090(2000)244<0001:motrja>2.0.co;2. hdl:2246/1593. S2CID 85577629.
- Reguero, M.A.; Dozo, M.T.; Cerdeño, E. (2007). "A poorly known rodentlike mammal (Pachyrukhinae, Hegetotheriidae, Notoungulata) from the Deseadan (Late Oligocene) of Argentina. Paleoecology, biogeography, and radiation of the rodentlike ungulates in South America" (PDF). Journal of Paleontology. 81 (6): 1301–1307. doi:10.1666/05-100.1. S2CID 55259241.
- Steppan, S.J. (1995). "Revision of the tribe Phyllotini (Rodentia: Sigmodontinae), with a phylogenetic hypothesis for the Sigmodontinae". Fieldiana Zoology. 80: 1–112. doi:10.5962/bhl.title.3336.
- Tate, G.H.H. (1951). "The rodents of Australia and New Guinea". Bulletin of the American Museum of Natural History. 97: 187–430. hdl:2246/1060.
- Voss, R.S. (1988). "Systematics and ecology of ichthyomyine rodents (Muroidea): patterns of morphological evolution in a small adaptive radiation". Bulletin of the American Museum of Natural History. 188: 259–493.
- Voss, R.S. (1992). "A revision of the South American species of Sigmodon (Mammalia: Muridae) with notes on their natural history and biogeography". American Museum Novitates (3050): 1–56.
- Weksler, M. (2006). "Phylogenetic relationships of oryzomyine rodents (Muroidea: Sigmodontinae): separate and combined analyses of morphological and molecular data". Bulletin of the American Museum of Natural History. 296: 1–149. doi:10.1206/0003-0090(2006)296[0001:PROORM]2.0.CO;2. hdl:2246/5777. S2CID 86057173.
- Weksler, M.; Percequillo, A.R.; Voss, R.S. (2006). "Ten new genera of oryzomyine rodents (Cricetidae: Sigmodontinae)". American Museum Novitates (3537): 1–29. doi:10.1206/0003-0082(2006)3537[1:TNGOOR]2.0.CO;2. hdl:2246/5815. S2CID 84088556.
- Wood, A.E. (1935). "Evolution and relationships of the heteromyid rodents with new forms from the Tertiary of western North America". Annals of Carnegie Museum. 24: 73–262. doi:10.5962/p.215194. S2CID 251511528.
