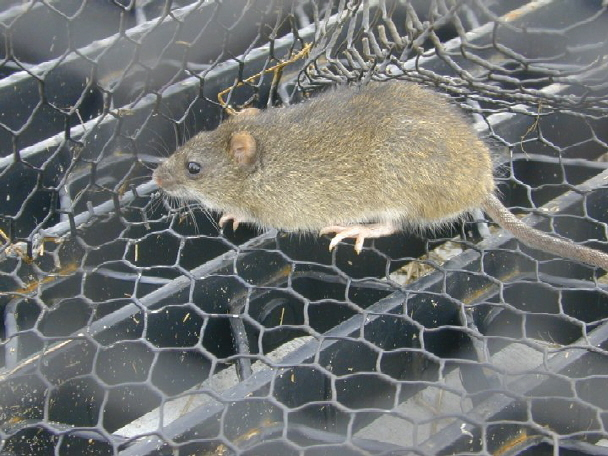
- Marsh rice rat (Oryzomys palustris)

Scientific classification
- Kingdom: Animalia
- Phylum: Chordata
- Class: Mammalia
- Order: Rodentia
- Family: Cricetidae
- Subfamily: Sigmodontinae
- Tribe: Oryzomyini; Vorontzov, 1959

Type genus
- Oryzomys Baird, 1858

Genera
- Aegialomys; †Agathaeromys; Amphinectomys; †Antillomys; †Carletonomys; Cerradomys; Drymoreomys; †Dushimys; †"Ekbletomys"; Eremoryzomys; Euryoryzomys; Handleyomys; Holochilus; Hylaeamys; Lundomys; †Megalomys; †Megaoryzomys; Melanomys; Microakodontomys; Microryzomys; Mindomys; Neacomys; Nectomys; Nephelomys; Nesoryzomys; †Noronhomys; Oecomys; Oligoryzomys; Oreoryzomys; Oryzomys; †Pennatomys; Pseudoryzomys; †Reigomys; Scolomys; Sigmodontomys; Sooretamys; Tanyuromys; Transandinomys; Zygodontomys

Diversity
- About 120 species in about 30 genera

Synonyms
- Oryzomyini Vorontsov, 1959; Zygodontomyini Eisenberg, 1989 (nomen nudum)

= Oryzomyini =

Oryzomyini Temporal range: Pleistocene – recent

Tribe of rodents

Oryzomyini is a tribe of rodents in the subfamily Sigmodontinae of the family Cricetidae. It includes about 120 species in about thirty genera, distributed from the eastern United States to the southernmost parts of South America, including many offshore islands. It is part of the clade Oryzomyalia, which includes most of the South American Sigmodontinae.

The name Oryzomyini derives from that of its type genus, Oryzomys, which means "rice rat" or "rice mouse". Many species are also known as rice rats.

== Taxonomy ==
=== Contents of Oryzomyini ===
An oryzomyine group was first envisaged by Oldfield Thomas in the early 20th century. He defined it to include pentalophodont species, which have a mesoloph(id) on the upper and lower molars, with a long palate (extending past the third molars). Thomas included Oligoryzomys, Oecomys, and Oryzomys (which included many species now in other genera), as well as Rhagomys, which is currently classified in the related tribe Thomasomyini instead. In 1944, Hershkovitz proposed a more extended definition of the group, excluding Rhagomys, but including Nectomys (then including Sigmodontomys), Neacomys, and Scolomys. Some subsequent authors did not separate the oryzomyines from the thomasomyines, which were distinguished from them by having a short palate, including Vorontsov, who in 1959 was the first to use Oryzomyini as a formal family-group name. He included most current oryzomyines as well as the thomasomyines and tylomyines, which are now known to be more distantly related.

The genera Holochilus (including Lundomys at the time), Pseudoryzomys, and Zygodontomys were not included at the time because of their tetralophodont molars (lacking complete mesoloph(id)s); instead, Holochilus was considered to be a sigmodont, related to Sigmodon and Reithrodon, and Pseudoryzomys and Zygodontomys were considered to be members of Phyllotini, another large South American tribe. Although lacking mesoloph(id)s, these genera share other characters with oryzomyines, and a series of papers by Robert Voss and coworkers in the early 1990s established their membership in Oryzomyini.

In a 1993 paper, Voss and Carleton proposed the first cladistic diagnosis of Oryzomyini. They included twelve genera and proposed five synapomorphies for the tribe: presence of a pair of mammae on the chest; a long palate marked by posterolateral palatal pits, perforations near the third molar; absence of an alisphenoid strut, which in some sigmodontines separates two foramina (openings) in the skull; absence of a suspensory process of the squamosal bone attached to the roof of the tympanic cavity, the tegmen tympani; and absence of a gall bladder. Some of these have been reversed in some oryzomyines; for example, an alisphenoid strut is present in several oryzomyines, including Eremoryzomys.

The contents of Oryzomyini have been largely stable since, but the allocation of some animals has been contentious. Megaoryzomys, an extinct giant rat from the Galápagos Islands, has been allocated to both Oryzomyini and Thomasomyini, but its correct classification currently remains unclear. The genus Scolomys has been excluded from Oryzomyini on the basis of studies of the mitochondrial cytochrome b gene, but the nuclear IRBP gene provides evidence for its membership in Oryzomyini. Handleyomys fuscatus was placed in the thomasomyine genus Aepeomys before its close relationship to H. intectus was recognized in 2002. Microakodontomys transitorius was described as a transitional form between oryzomyines and akodontines, but later allied with Oryzomyini and even summarily dismissed as an anomalous Oligoryzomys.

In the early 2000s, the advent of molecular phylogenetics has led to progress in the understanding of the relationships of oryzomyines. They are currently classified in the family Cricetidae, which includes the voles, hamsters, deermice, and many other species, chiefly in the Americas and Eurasia. Within this family, they are part of the subfamily Sigmodontinae, which is mainly distributed in South America but also extends into southern North America. Sigmodontinae includes several tribes, most of which cluster into a clade now known as Oryzomyalia, which includes Oryzomyini, Akodontini, Phyllotini, Thomasomyini, and other, smaller groups, but not the cotton rats (Sigmodon) and the Ichthyomyini.

=== Internal classification ===
The relationships among the oryzomyine genera have long been obscure, although several studies provided insights into the relations of some genera. The single most significant problem in oryzomyine taxonomy has been the definition of the type genus, Oryzomys, which in one classification included all animals then recognized as oryzomyines. Many groups were later excluded from the genus, but even so it included forty species that did not form a monophyletic group.

In the 2000s, Marcelo Weksler published several studies in which he used evidence from IRBP, a nuclear gene, and morphology to assess the relationships among the members of Oryzomyini. He provided support for several intergeneric relationships and clarified the scale of the Oryzomys problem, as species of Oryzomys appeared in about ten separate clades. In a 2006 publication, he and coworkers described ten new genera for species previously placed in Oryzomys and transferred some others to Handleyomys, leaving only about six species in Oryzomys.

- Oryzomyini
  - Clade A
  - - Clade B
    - - Clade C
      - Clade D

Possible relationships of major oryzomyine clades.

Weksler's analyses suggested that oryzomyines fall into four major clades, which were largely congruent across his analyses of morphology and IRBP, but support for all of those was limited and the placement of some genera remained unclear. He dubbed these clades "clade A" through "clade D". Some analyses supported a relationship between clades C and D, which in turn were related to clade B, with clade A at a basal position, but other analyses could not resolve the relationships among the major clades. The four clades are as follows:

- Clade A includes only Scolomys and Zygodontomys, but support for a relationship between those morphologically and ecologically dissimilar genera was not strong.
- Clade B includes at least Oecomys, Handleyomys, Euryoryzomys, Transandinomys, Hylaeamys, and Nephelomys, the latter four of which were included in Oryzomys until 2006. Amphinectomys and Mindomys were also recovered in the clade in some analyses, but the former, for which most morphological characters are unknown, is more likely related to Nectomys within clade D and the relations of the latter, a poorly known yet unique animal, are obscure as some analyses suggest it is a basal member of Oryzomyini. There is little support for all intergeneric relationships within the clade.
- Clade C includes Oligoryzomys, Neacomys, Microryzomys, and Oreoryzomys, which was placed in Oryzomys until 2006. No intergeneric relationships within this clade received substantial support.
- Clade D includes Drymoreomys, Eremoryzomys, Cerradomys, Sooretamys, Oryzomys, Lundomys, Pseudoryzomys, Holochilus, Aegialomys, Nesoryzomys, Melanomys, Sigmodontomys, Nectomys, most likely Amphinectomys, and the extinct Megalomys, Agathaeromys, and Pennatomys. Eremoryzomys, Cerradomys, Sooretamys, and Aegialomys were included in Oryzomys before 2006. There is some support for a basal placement of Eremoryzomys within this clade and for two major groups of related genera, one including Holochilus, Lundomys, and Pseudoryzomys and the other Nectomys, Amphinectomys, Sigmodontomys, Melanomys, Aegialomys, and Nesoryzomys, with the extinct Megalomys and Pennatomys. The Holochilus–Lundomys–Pseudoryzomys group also includes the extinct Noronhomys and Carletonomys. Oryzomys may be its closest relative, but it is possible that this arrangement is the result of a convergent development of adaptations to a life in the water in the two groups. Within the group of Nectomys and related genera, there is some support for a core group that excludes Aegialomys and Nesoryzomys and for two subclades within the core group, one including Nectomys and Amphinectomys and the other Melanomys and Sigmodontomys.

The affinities of some species remain unclear. Many oryzomyines are known from the Lesser Antilles, including "Ekbletomys hypenemus" and species of Megalomys and Oligoryzomys, but most remain undescribed.

== Description ==
Most oryzomyines are nondescript rodents that look like common house mice and rats, but the tribe also includes some spectacularly specialized forms. The smallest members, mainly in clade C, may have a head-body length of as little as 65 millimetres (2.6 in) and mass of 10 grams (0.4 oz), but the largest living oryzomyine, Nectomys, reaches head and body lengths over 250 millimetres (9.8 in) and mass of about 300 grams (10 oz); Lundomys and Holochilus are only a little smaller. Some of the extinct species from the Lesser Antilles, such as "Ekbletomys hypenemus" and Megalomys desmarestii, were even larger.

== Distribution and ecology ==
Oryzomyines range from New Jersey in the north, where the Marsh Rice Rat (Oryzomys palustris) is found, to Tierra del Fuego in the south, where Oligoryzomys magellanicus occurs. Extinct species are known from Jamaica (Oryzomys antillarum), the Galápagos Islands (Nesoryzomys and Aegialomys galapagoensis), Fernando de Noronha (Noronhomys), and the Lesser Antilles north to Anguilla (Megalomys, Oligoryzomys victus, and several unidentified genera). They are abundant in many environments, from rainforest to grassland. Most live in the forest, but Zygodontomys, Lundomys, Pseudoryzomys, Aegialomys, and Nesoryzomys live exclusively in open vegetation and some other genera include both forest and non-forest forms. Most oryzomyines are relatively unspecialized animals that live on the ground, but Oecomys is specialized to live in trees and various members of clade D, including Holochilus, Oryzomys, and Nectomys, are semiaquatic, spending at least some of their time in the water.

== Literature cited ==
- Musser, G.G. and Carleton, M.D. 2005. Superfamily Muroidea. Pp. 894–1531 in Wilson, D.E. and Reeder, D.M. (eds.). Mammal Species of the World: a taxonomic and geographic reference. 3rd ed. Baltimore: The Johns Hopkins University Press, 2 vols., 2142 pp. ISBN 978-0-8018-8221-0
- Pardiñas, U.F.J. 2008. A new genus of oryzomyine rodent (Cricetidae: Sigmodontinae) from the Pleistocene of Argentina (subscription required). Journal of Mammalogy 89(5):1270–1278.
- Pardiñas, U.F.J., D'Elía, G. and Ortiz, P.E. 2002. Sigmodontinos fósiles (Rodentia, Muroidea, Sigmodontinae) de América del sur: Estado actual de su conocimiento y prospectiva. Mastozoología Neotropical 9(2):209–252 (in Spanish).
- Percequillo, A.R., Weksler, M., and Costa, L.P. 2011. A new genus and species of rodent from the Brazilian Atlantic Forest (Rodentia: Cricetidae: Sigmodontinae: Oryzomyini), with comments on oryzomyine biogeography (subscription required). Zooilogical Journal of the Linnean Society 161(2):357–390.
- Ray, C.E. 1962. The Oryzomyine Rodents of the Antillean Subregion. Doctor of Philosophy thesis, Harvard University, 211 pp.
- Turvey, S.T. 2009. Holocene Extinctions. Oxford University Press US, 359 pp. ISBN 978-0-19-953509-5
- Turvey, S.T., Weksler, M., Morris, E.L., and Nokkert, M. 2010. Taxonomy, phylogeny, and diversity of the extinct Lesser Antillean rice rats (Sigmodontinae: Oryzomyini), with description of a new genus and species (subscription required). Zoological Journal of the Linnean Society 160:748–772.
- Voss, R.S. and Carleton, M.D. 1993. A new genus for Hesperomys molitor Winge and Holochilus magnus Hershkovitz (Mammalia, Muridae) with an analysis of its phylogenetic relationships. American Museum Novitates 3085:1–39.
- Voss, R.S., Gómez-Laverde, M. and Pacheco, V. 2002. A new genus for Aepeomys fuscatus Allen, 1912, and Oryzomys intectus Thomas, 1921: Enigmatic murid rodents from Andean cloud forests. American Museum Novitates 3373:1–42.
- Voss, R.S. and Myers, P. 1991. Pseudoryzomys simplex (Rodentia: Muridae) and the significance of Lund's collections from the caves of Lagoa Santa, Brazil. Bulletin of the American Museum of Natural History 206:414–432.
- Weksler, M. 2006. Phylogenetic relationships of oryzomyine rodents (Muroidea: Sigmodontinae): separate and combined analyses of morphological and molecular data. Bulletin of the American Museum of Natural History 296:1–149.
- Weksler, M., Percequillo, A.R. and Voss, R.S. 2006. Ten new genera of oryzomyine rodents (Cricetidae: Sigmodontinae). American Museum Novitates 3537:1–29.
- Zijlstra, J.S., Madern, P.A. and Hoek Ostende, L.W. van den. 2010. New genus and two new species of Pleistocene oryzomyines (Cricetidae: Sigmodontinae) from Bonaire, Netherlands Antilles (subscription required). Journal of Mammalogy 91(4):860–873.
