= Interorbital region =

Region of the skull

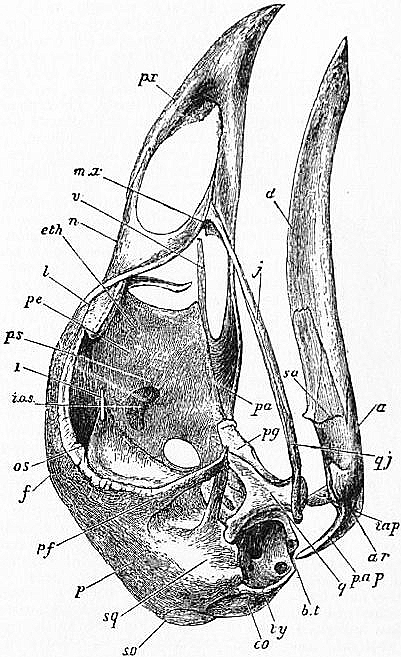

The interorbital region of the skull is located between the eyes, anterior to the braincase. The form of the interorbital region may exhibit significant variation between taxonomic groups.

In oryzomyine rodents, for example, the width, form, and presence of beading in the interorbital region vary among species. In birds and many other animals whose eyes are set on the side of the skull, the interorbital region normally consists of a thin interorbital septum only. This may be pierced by a hole of larger or smaller size, connecting the eye sockets.
