= Glossary of mammalian dental topography =

Many different terms have been proposed for features of the tooth crown in mammals.

The structures within the molars receive different names according to their position and morphology. This nomenclature was developed by Henry Fairfield Osborn in 1907 and is, although with many variations, the one that continues today.

== Suffixes ==
Tooth structures bear suffixes in order to note the type of structure they are and whether they are present in the upper or lower molars.

- The suffix "-cones /-conids" (upper molar/lower molar) is added to the main cusps: Paracone, Metacone, Protocone and Hypocone on the upper molar, and Paraconid, Metaconid, Protoconid, Hypoconid and Entoconid on the lower molar. This name is used for both bunodont and selenodont molars, that is, as many for "buno" pillar-like cusps as for "selenes" crescent-like cusps.
- The suffix "-conule /-conulid" (upper molar/lower molar) is added to the secondary cusps. For example, Metaconule, Hypoconulid.
- The suffix "-style/-stylid" (upper molar/lower molar) is added to the peripheral cusps that are found in the cornices or cingulus of the tooth. These cusps are traditionally named according to their proximity to the main cusps, although some anatomists prefer to name them according to their position on the tooth.
- The suffix "-loph/-lophid" (upper molar/lower molar) is added to the crests that join cusps together. They include in the name one the cusps involved. For example, the hypolophid is the ridge that unites the hypoconid with the entoconid. These ridges often have secondary ridges: the secondary crest of the ectoloph is called crista; antecrochet to that of the protoloph, and crochet to that of the metaloph.
- The suffix "-crista / -cristid" (upper molar / lower molar) is used for the ridges that come out of the cusps but do not connect them with other cusps. It is also used to name the edges of selenes.
- To the structures in the lingual part of the molar, the prefix "ento-" ("internal") is often added, while those of the lingual part are added the prefix "ecto-" ("external"). the mesial part of the molar is often added the prefix "pre-" (from "previous") while those of the distal part are added the prefix "post-" ("posterior"). The mesial part is that which is towards the incisors.
- The suffix "-flexus / -flexid" (upper molar / lower molar) is used for the open valleys in the occlusal surfaces of the hypsodont teeth. When this valleys are enclosed, they are called fossetes/fossetids (upper molar / lower molar). Sometimes they are used also for the folds of the teeth, although the proper name for the folds is sulcus (pl. sulci).
- The cusp prefixes "para-", "meta-", "proto-", "hypo-", etc., are related to the succession and position of the cusps according to the ancient tritubercular theory of the evolution of molars from Cope and Osborn. Although this theory has lost its validity, they continue to use the names for the description of the molars. The prefix "proto" referred to the original cusp which would be homologous to a single cusp tooth according to Osborn, and would be the first cusp to appear not only in evolution but in development. This was criticized early by studies of embryology where it was shown that the first cusp in the embryonic development of the upper molars was the paracone. Later this was shown to be variable and the first cusp to appear in ontogeny would not be related to the evolution of the tooth.

== Major features ==
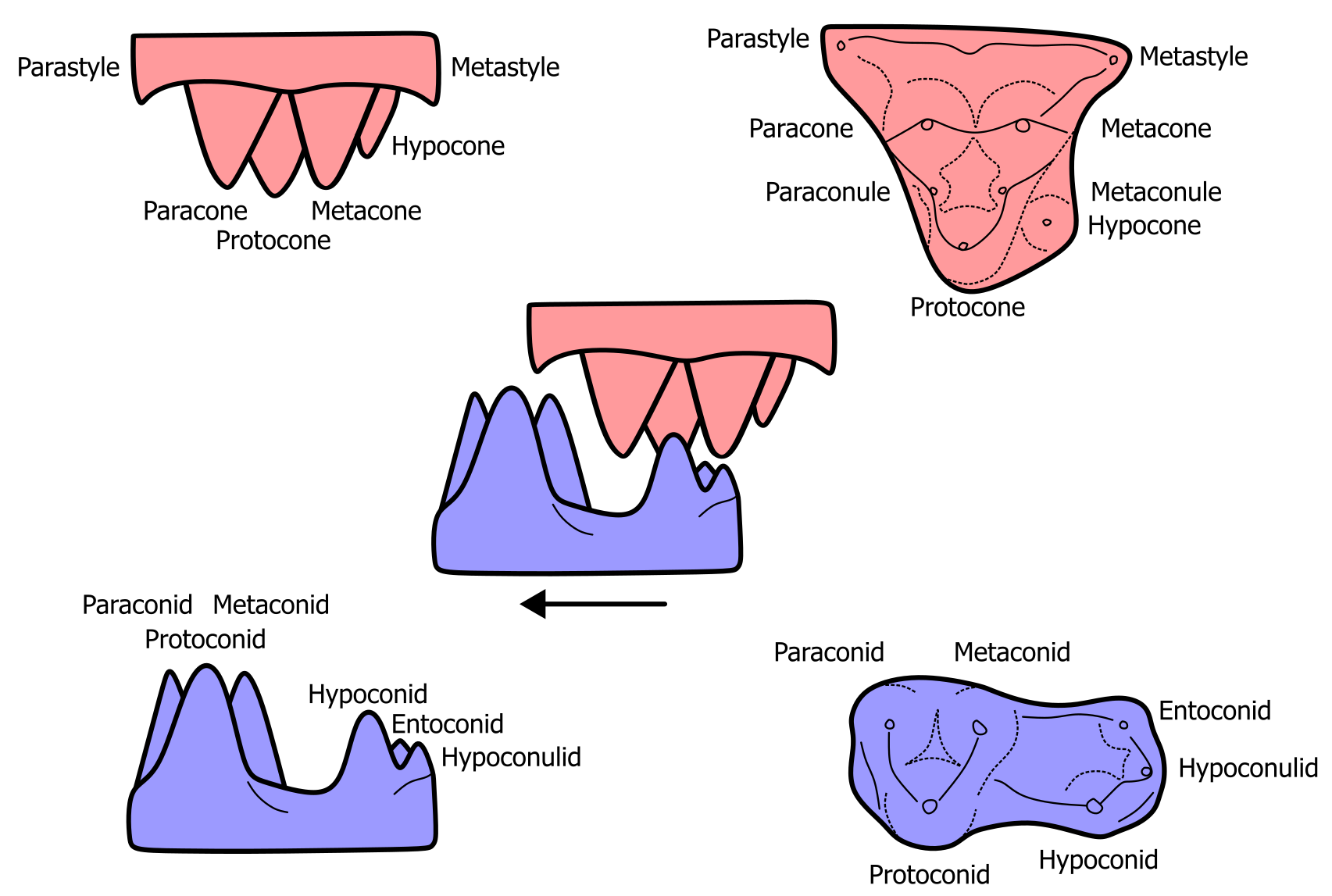
A diagram of generalized tribosphenic molars with notable features labelled. Upper left molar in pink, lower left molar in blue. Mesial (forwards) is to the left. Teeth are depicted in left lateral view (left side and center of the image) or occlusal view (right side of the image).

The positions of tooth features are described along four directions: mesial (forwards, towards the chin), distal (backwards, towards the jaw joint), lingual (inwards, towards the tongue), and buccal or labial (outwards, towards the cheek).

=== Upper teeth ===
Therians (marsupials and placentals) ancestrally have roughly triangular upper molars, with the apex pointing lingually (inwards) and the flat edge positioned labially (outwards). This fundamental three-pointed structure is sometimes called the trigon. Three major cusps are almost always present:

- Protocone: A major cusp at the lingual apex of the upper molar. In mammals with tribosphenic teeth, the protocone slides into the talonid basin on the lower teeth in order to grind and crush food. Often the largest cusp in the upper molar, though some insectivorous mammals reduce it substantially.
- Paracone: A major cusp outwards from the protocone and in front of the metacone.
- Metacone: A major cusp outwards from the protocone and behind the paracone.

Other common features include:

- Stylar shelf: A shelf or offset surface along the outer edge of the tooth. Often bears minor cusps (stylar cusps or conules).
  - Parastyle: A forward extension of the stylar shelf which juts out at the mesiolabial (front outer) corner of the tooth, in front of and outwards from the paracone. May bear one or more minor cusps (including the stylocone, which is observed in some extinct mammals).
  - Metastyle: A rearward extension of the stylar shelf which juts out at the distolabial (rear outer) corner of the tooth, behind and outwards from the metacone. May bear one or more minor cusps.
  - Mesostyle: A cusp at the midpoint of the stylar shelf.
  - Ectoflexus: A notch at the midpoint of the stylar shelf.
- Paraconule / Protoconule: A minor cusp on the front edge of the tooth, between the protocone and paracone.
- Metaconule: A minor cusp on the rear edge of the tooth, between the protocone and metacone.
- Hypocone: A fourth major cusp which only becomes widespread in placentals. It develops at the distolingual (rear inner) corner of the tooth, behind the protocone and inwards from the metacone. Mammals with a large hypocone (such as humans) have upper molars with four cusps set in a quadrate (square-shaped) arrangement rather than a triangular form. Many marsupials and artiodactyls have an enlarged metaconule which serves the same role as the hypocone and is occasionally labelled as a hypocone, despite being derived from a different part of the tooth.

=== Lower teeth ===
Therians ancestrally have lower molars which are longer from front-to-back than from side-to-side. Five to six cusps are most common. The trigonid region at the front part of the molar is triangular, with three large cusps:

- Protoconid: A major cusp at the labial apex of the trigonid region. Often the largest cusp in the lower molar.
- Paraconid: A major cusp on the inner edge of the trigonid region, inwards from the protoconid and in front of the metaconid. Humans and most other primates no longer possess a paraconid in their lower molars, leaving only five cusps.
- Metaconid: A major cusp on the inner edge of the trigonid region, inwards from the protoconid and behind the paraconid.

The talonid region at the rear part of the molar has two to three relatively small cusps which define the rear rim of a low basin:

- Hypoconid: A major cusp at the outer rear edge of the talonid region. Typically the largest and most consistently present cusp in the talonid, though usually smaller than the trigonid cusps. The hypoconid occludes with the space at the center of the upper molar (between the protocone, paracone, and metacone).
- Entoconid: A major cusp which is sometimes present at the inner rear edge of the talonid region.
- Hypoconulid: A minor cusp which is sometimes present at the rear edge of the talonid region, between the hypoconid and entoconid.

Other common features include:

- Cristid obliqua: A diagonal crest which runs from the hypoconid forwards to the midpoint between the protoconid and metaconid.

== Image gallery ==
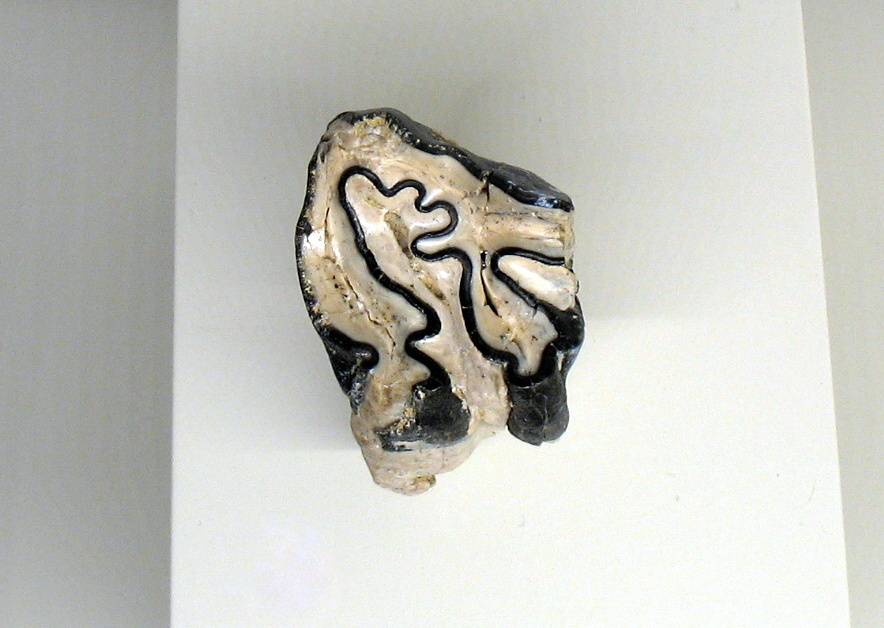
Lophodont teeth with ectoloph, protoloph and metaloph, several small cristae, and an entoflexus and postflexus.

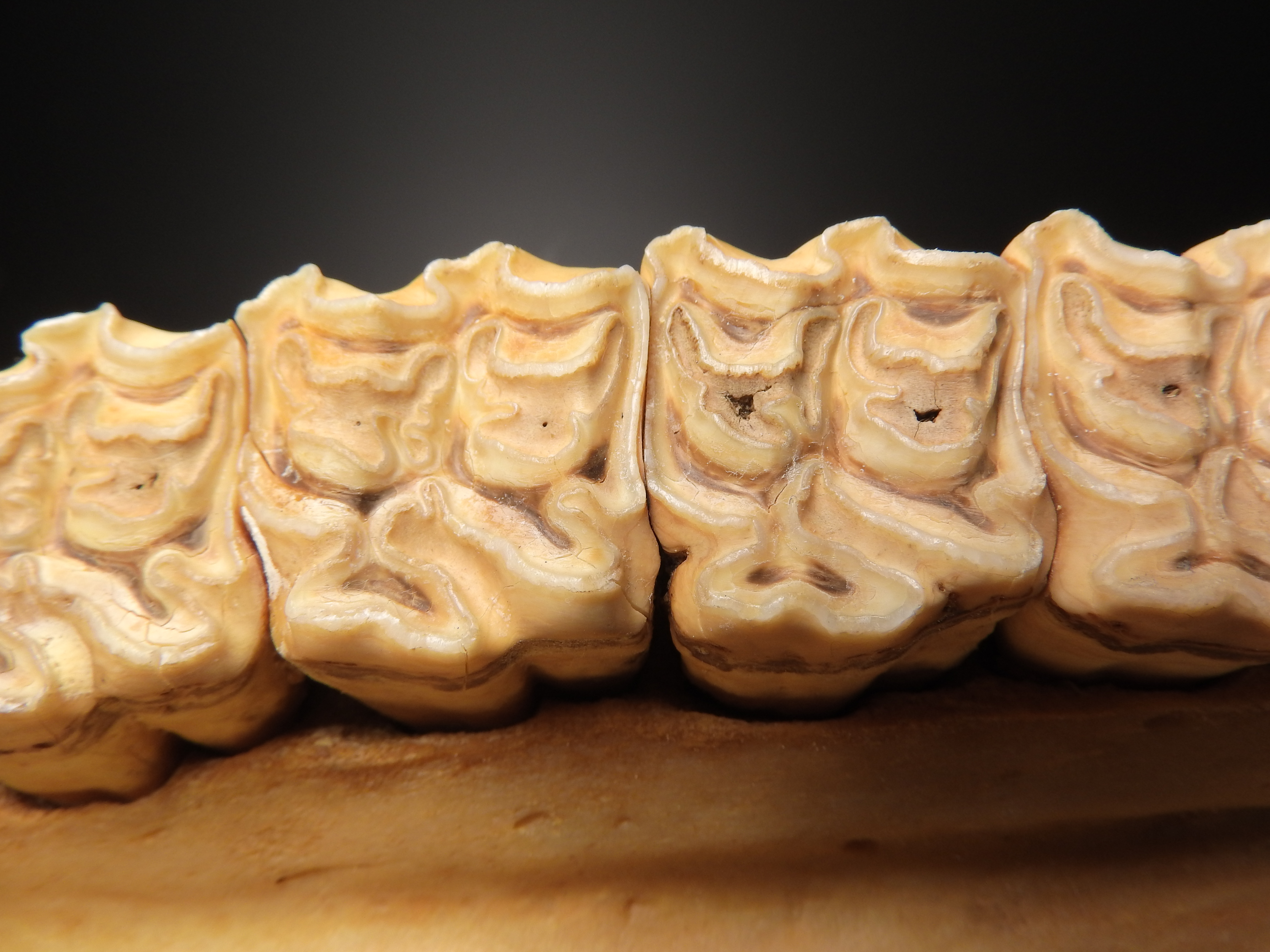
The bunolophoselenodont dentition of a horse.

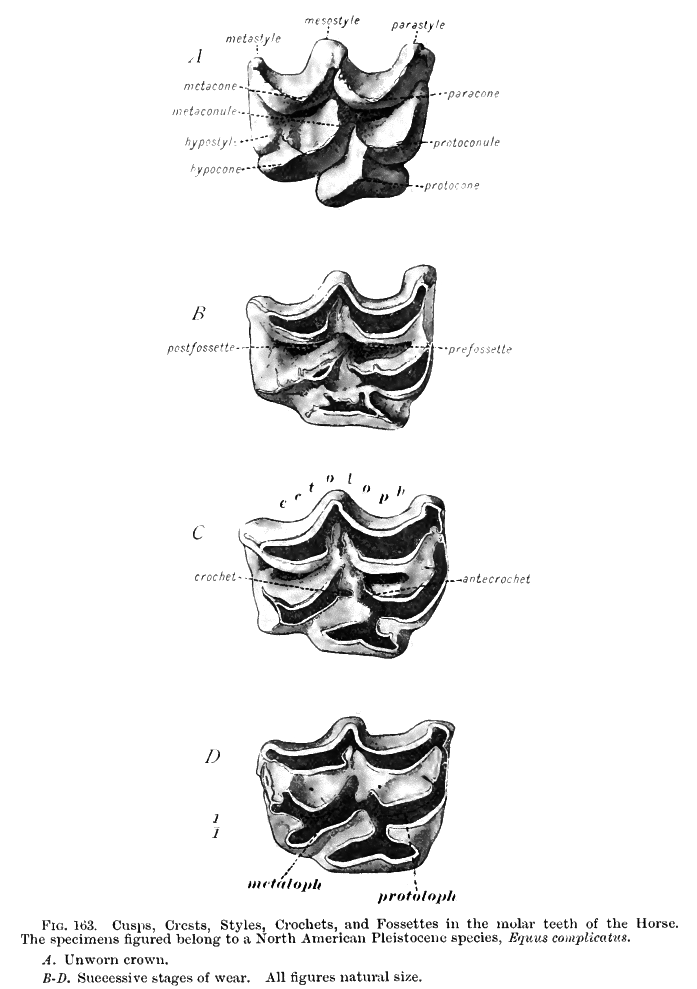

== Cricetidae molar teeth nomenclature after Reig (1977) ==
These are a list of tooth features identified in the rodent family Cricetidae (hamsters, voles, New World mice and rats, etc.). Source:

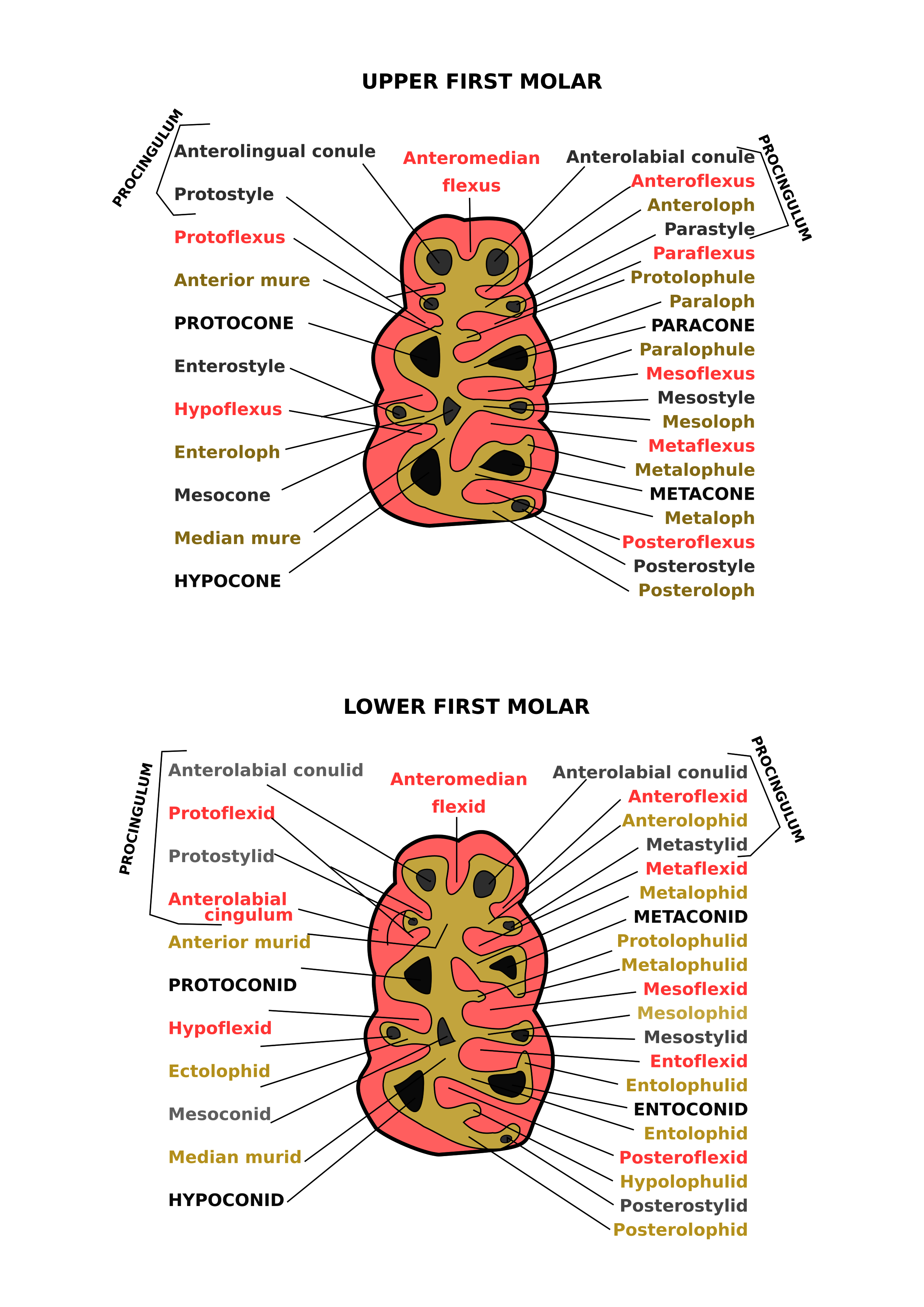
Cricetidae molar teeth nomenclature after Reig, 1977.

=== Upper teeth ===
Name	Nomenclature term is used in	Definition	Comments	Image
Anterolingual conule	Reig (1977)	A conule on the lingual side of an anterocone divided by an anteromedian flexus or fossette		
Anteromedian flexus	Reig (1977)	A longitudinal flexus dividing the anterocone into anterolabial and anterolingual conules		
Anterolabial conule	Reig (1977)	A conule on the labial side of an anterocone divided by an anteromedian flexus or fossette		
Anterocone	Reig (1977)	A cusp at the front of the tooth that may be divided into anterolabial and anterolingual conules		
Protostyle	Reig (1977)	A style in front of the protocone, in the protoflexus		
Protoflexus	Reig (1977)	A flexus between the protocone and the anterolingual conule		
Anterior mure	Reig (1977)	A crest connecting the anterocone to the protocone		
Protocone	Reig (1977)	One of the main cusps, at the anterolingual side		
Enterostyle	Reig (1977)	A style between the protocone and the hypocone, in the hypoflexus		
Enteroloph	Reig (1977)	A crest connecting the enterostyle to the mesocone		
Hypoflexus	Reig (1977)	A flexus between the protocone and the hypocone		
Mesocone	Reig (1977)	A conule in the median mure where the mesoloph is attached to it		
Median mure	Reig (1977)	A crest connecting the protocone/paracone to the hypocone/metacone		
Hypocone	Reig (1977)	One of the main cusps, at the posterolingual side		
Procingulum	Reig (1977)	The front part of the tooth, before the anterior mure		
Anteroflexus	Reig (1977)	A flexus between the anteroloph and the anterolabial conule		
Anteroloph	Reig (1977)	A crest between the paracone and the anterolabial conule that may be connecting to a parastyle		
Parastyle	Reig (1977)	A style in front of the paracone		
Paraflexus	Reig (1977)	A flexus in front of the paracone		
Protolophule	Reig (1977)	A small crest in the paraflexus, connected to the protocone		
Paraloph	Reig (1977)	A crest attaching the paracone to the protocone or the median mure		
Paracone	Reig (1977)	One of the main cusps, at the anterolabial side		
Paralophule	Reig (1977)	A small crest attached to the back side of the paracone		
Mesoflexus	Reig (1977)	A flexus between the mesoloph and the paracone		
Mesostyle	Reig (1977)	A style at the labial margin between the paracone and metacone		
Mesoloph	Reig (1977)	A crest in front of the metaflexus, connected to the median mure		
Metaflexus	Reig (1977)	A flexus in front of the metacone		
Metalophule	Reig (1977)	A small crest attached to the front side of the metacone		
Metacone	Reig (1977)	One of the main cusps, at the posterolabial side		
Metaloph	Reig (1977)	A crest attaching the paracone to the hypocone		
Posteroflexus	Reig (1977)	A flexus between the posteroloph and the metacone		
Posterostyle	Reig (1977)	A crest on the posterolabial corner of the molar		
Posteroloph	Reig (1977)	A crest at the back of the molar, connected to the hypocone		

=== Lower teeth ===
Name	Nomenclature term is used in	Definition	Comments	Image
Anterolingual conulid	Reig (1977)	A conulid on the lingual side of an anteroconid divided by an anteromedian flexid or fossettid		
Anteromedian flexid	Reig (1977)	A longitudinal flexid dividing the anteroconid into anterolabial and anterolingual conules		
Anterolabial conulid	Reig (1977)	A conulid on the labial side of an anteroconid divided by an anteromedian flexid or fossettid		
Anteroconid	Reig (1977)	A cusp at the front of the tooth that may be divided into anterolabial and anterolingual conulids		
Anterolabial cingulum	Reig (1977)	A crest before the protoconid and protoflexid		
Protostylid	Reig (1977)	A stylid in front of the protoconid, in the protoflexid		
Protoflexid	Reig (1977)	A flexid between the protoconid and the anterolabial conulid		
Anterior murid	Reig (1977)	A crest connecting the anteroconid to the protoconid		
Protoconid	Reig (1977)	One of the main cusps, at the anterolabial side		
Ectostylid	Reig (1977)	A stylid between the protoconid and the hypoconid, in the hypoflexid		
Ectolophid	Reig (1977)	A crest connecting the ectostylid to the mesoconid		
Hypoflexid	Reig (1977)	A flexid between the protoconid and the hypoconid		
Mesoconid	Reig (1977)	A conulid in the median murid where the mesolophid is attached to it		
Median murid	Reig (1977)	A crest connecting the protoconid/metaconid to the hypoconid/entoconid		
Hypoconid	Reig (1977)	One of the main cusps, at the posterolabial side		
Procingulum	Reig (1977)	The front part of the tooth, before the anterior murid		
Anteroflexid	Reig (1977)	A flexid between the anterolophid and the anterolingual conulid		
Anterolophid	Reig (1977)	A crest between the metaconid and the anterolabial conulid that may be connecting to a metastylid		
Metastylid	Reig (1977)	A stylid in front of the metaconid		
Metaflexid	Reig (1977)	A flexid in front of the metaconid		
Protolophulid	Reig (1977)	A small crest in the mesoflexid, connected to the protoconid		
Metalophid	Reig (1977)	A crest attaching the metaconid to the protoconid or the anterior murid		
Metaconid	Reig (1977)	One of the main cusps, at the anterolingual side		
Metalophulid	Reig (1977)	A small crest attached to the back side of the metaconid		
Mesoflexid	Reig (1977)	A flexid between the mesolophid and the paraconid		
Mesostylid	Reig (1977)	A stylid at the labial margin between the metaconid and entoconid		
Mesolophid	Reig (1977)	A crest in front of the entoflexid, connected to the median murid		
Entoflexid	Reig (1977)	A flexid in front of the entoconid		
Entolophulid	Reig (1977)	A small crest attached to the front side of the entoconid		
Entoconid	Reig (1977)	One of the main cusps, at the posterolingual side		
Entolophid	Reig (1977)	A crest attaching the entoconid to the hypoconid or median murid		
Posteroflexid	Reig (1977)	A flexid between the posterolophid and the metaconid		
Hypolophulid	Reig (1977)	A small crest in the posteroflexid attached to the posterolophid		
Posterostylid	Reig (1977)	A crest on the posterolingual corner of the molar		
Posterolophid	Reig (1977)	A crest at the back of the molar, connected to the hypoconid		

== See also ==
- Molar (tooth)
