= List of mammals of Uruguay =

This is a list of the mammal species recorded in Uruguay. This list is derived from the IUCN Red List which lists species of mammals and includes those mammals that have recently been classified as extinct (since 1500 AD). The taxonomy and naming of the individual species is based on those used in existing Wikipedia articles as of 21 May 2007 and supplemented by the common names and taxonomy from the IUCN, Smithsonian Institution, or University of Michigan where no Wikipedia article was available.

The following tags are used to highlight each species' conservation status as assessed by the International Union for Conservation of Nature:

| EX | Extinct | No reasonable doubt that the last individual has died. |
| EW | Extinct in the wild | Known only to survive in captivity or as a naturalized populations well outside its previous range. |
| CR | Critically endangered | The species is in imminent risk of extinction in the wild. |
| EN | Endangered | The species is facing an extremely high risk of extinction in the wild. |
| VU | Vulnerable | The species is facing a high risk of extinction in the wild. |
| NT | Near threatened | The species does not meet any of the criteria that would categorise it as risking extinction but it is likely to do so in the future. |
| LC | Least concern | There are no current identifiable risks to the species. |
| DD | Data deficient | There is inadequate information to make an assessment of the risks to this species. |

Some species were assessed using an earlier set of criteria. Species assessed using this system have the following instead of near threatened and least concern categories:

| LR/cd | Lower risk/conservation dependent | Species which were the focus of conservation programmes and may have moved into a higher risk category if that programme was discontinued. |
| LR/nt | Lower risk/near threatened | Species which are close to being classified as vulnerable but are not the subject of conservation programmes. |
| LR/lc | Lower risk/least concern | Species for which there are no identifiable risks. |

== Subclass: Theria ==
=== Infraclass: Eutheria ===
==== Order: Carnivora (carnivorans) ====
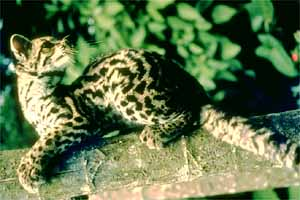
Margay

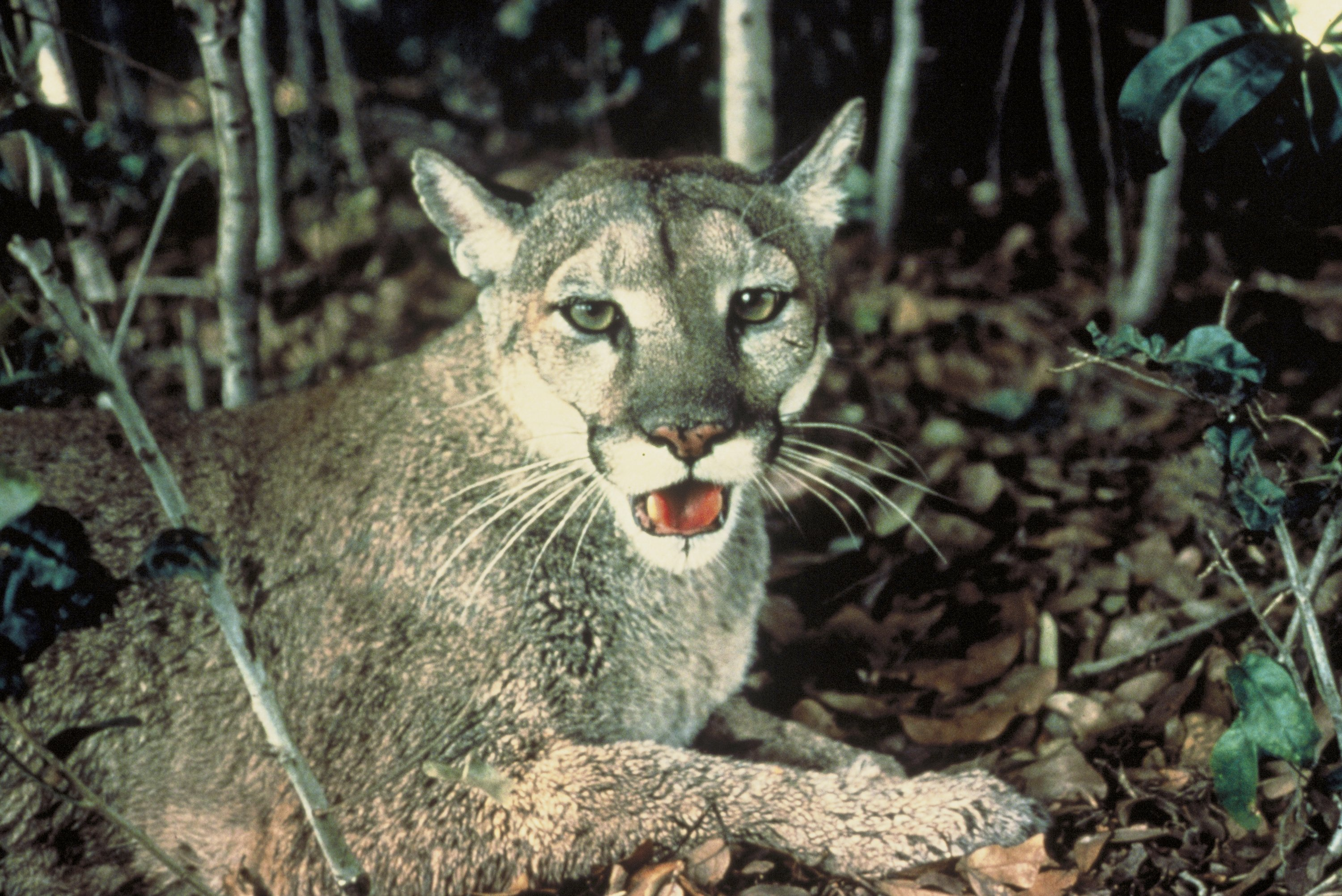
Cougar

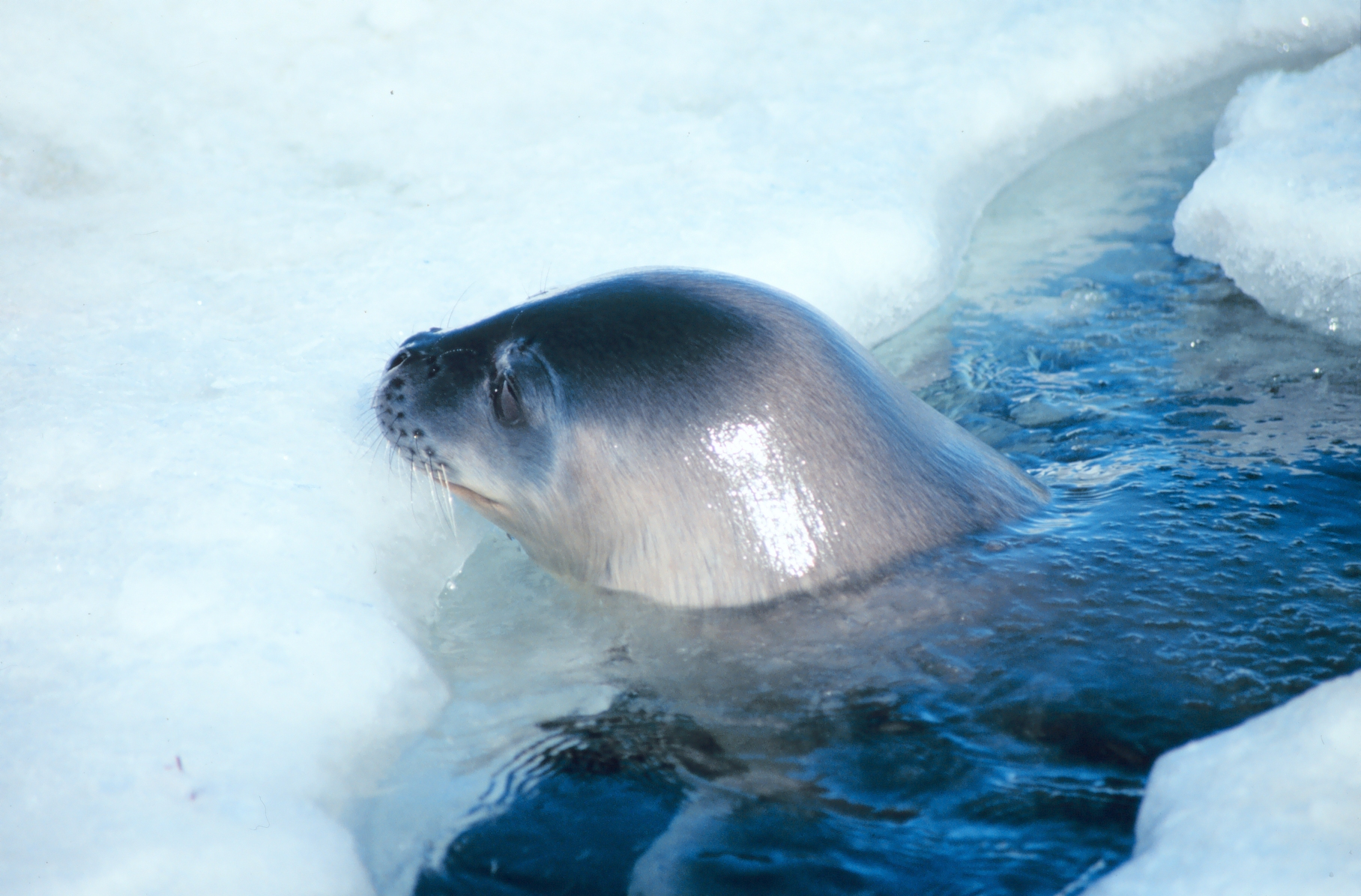
Weddell seal

Carnivorans include over 260 species, the majority of which eat meat as their primary dietary item. They have a characteristic skull shape and dentition.

- Suborder: Feliformia
  - Family: Felidae (cats)
    - Subfamily: Felinae
      - Genus: Herpailurus
        - Jaguarundi, H. yagouaroundi LC presence uncertain
      - Genus: Leopardus
        - Pampas cat L. colocola NT
        - Geoffroy's cat L. geoffroyi LC
        - Ocelot L. pardalis LC
        - Margay L. wiedii NT
      - Genus: Puma
        - Cougar, P. concolor LC
    - Subfamily: Pantherinae
      - Genus: Panthera
        - Jaguar, P. onca NT extirpated
- Suborder: Caniformia
  - Family: Canidae (dogs, foxes)
    - Genus: Dusicyon
      - D. avus EX
    - Genus: Cerdocyon
      - Crab-eating fox, C. thous LC
    - Genus: Chrysocyon
      - Maned wolf, C. brachyurus LC possibly extirpated
    - Genus: Lycalopex
      - Pampas fox, L. gymnocercus LC
  - Family: Procyonidae (raccoons)
    - Genus: Procyon
      - Crab-eating raccoon, P. cancrivorus LC
    - Genus: Nasua
      - South American coati, Nasua nasua
  - Family: Mustelidae (mustelids)
    - Genus: Lontra
      - Neotropical river otter, Lontra longicaudis NT
    - Genus: Pteronura
      - Giant otter, Pteronura brasiliensis EN presence uncertain
  - Family: Mephitidae
    - Genus: Conepatus
      - Molina's hog-nosed skunk, Conepatus chinga
  - Family: Otariidae (eared seals, sealions)
    - Genus: Arctocephalus
      - South American fur seal, Arctocephalus australis
    - Genus: Otaria
      - South American sea lion, Otaria flavescens
  - Family: Phocidae (earless seals)
    - Genus: Leptonychotes
      - Weddell seal, Leptonychotes weddellii
    - Genus: Lobodon
      - Crabeater seal, Lobodon carcinophaga
    - Genus: Mirounga
      - Southern elephant seal, Mirounga leonina

==== Order: Cingulata (armadillos) ====
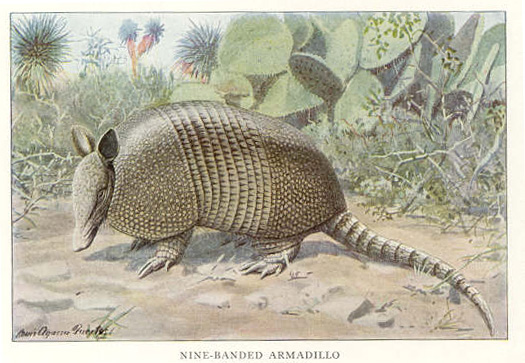
Nine-banded armadillo

The armadillos are small mammals with a bony armored shell. They are native to the Americas. There are around 20 extant species.

- Family: Dasypodidae (armadillos)
  - Subfamily: Dasypodinae
    - Genus: Dasypus
      - Southern long-nosed armadillo, D. hybridus NT
      - Nine-banded armadillo, D. novemcinctus LC
  - Subfamily: Euphractinae
    - Genus: Euphractus
      - Six-banded armadillo, E. sexcinctus LC
  - Subfamily: Tolypeutinae
    - Genus: Cabassous
      - Greater naked-tailed armadillo, C. tatouay LC
    - Genus: Priodontes
      - Giant armadillo, P. maximus VU extirpated

==== Order: Pilosa (anteaters, sloths and tamanduas) ====
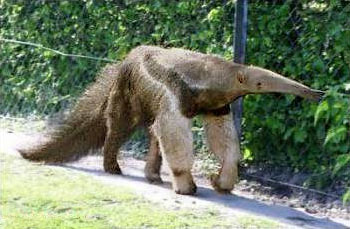
Giant anteater

The order Pilosa is extant only in the Americas and includes the anteaters, sloths, and tamanduas.

- Suborder: Vermilingua
  - Family: Myrmecophagidae (American anteaters)
    - Genus: Myrmecophaga
      - Giant anteater, Myrmecophaga tridactyla VU possibly extirpated
    - Genus: Tamandua
      - Southern tamandua, Tamandua tetradactyla LC

==== Order: Rodentia (rodents) ====
Rodents make up the largest order of mammals, with over 40% of mammalian species. They have two incisors in the upper and lower jaw which grow continually and must be kept short by gnawing. Most rodents are small though the capybara can weigh up to 45 kg (99 lb).

- Suborder: Hystricognathi
  - Family: Erethizontidae (New World porcupines)
    - Subfamily: Erethizontinae
      - Genus: Coendou
        - Paraguaian hairy dwarf porcupine, Coendou spinosus LR/lc
  - Family: Caviidae (guinea pigs)
    - Subfamily: Caviinae
      - Genus: Cavia
        - Brazilian guinea pig, Cavia aperea LR/lc
    - Subfamily: Hydrochoerinae (capybaras and rock cavies)
      - Genus: Hydrochoerus
        - Capybara Hydrochoerus hydrochaeris LR/lc
  - Family: Cuniculidae
    - Genus: Cuniculus
      - Lowland paca, Cuniculus paca LC
  - Family: Ctenomyidae
    - Genus: Ctenomys
      - Tiny tuco-tuco, Ctenomys minutus LR/lc
      - Pearson's tuco-tuco, Ctenomys pearsoni LR/lc
      - Collared tuco-tuco, Ctenomys torquatus LR/lc
  - Family: Myocastoridae (coypus)
    - Genus: Myocastor
      - Coypu, Myocastor coypus LR/lc
- Suborder: Sciurognathi
  - Family: Cricetidae
    - Subfamily: Sigmodontinae
      - Genus: Akodon
        - Azara's grass mouse, Akodon azarae LR/lc
        - Cursor grass mouse, Akodon cursor LR/lc
      - Genus: Calomys
        - Small vesper mouse, Calomys laucha LR/lc
      - Genus: Deltamys
        - Kemp's grass mouse, Deltamys kempi LR/lc
      - Genus: Holochilus
        - Web-footed marsh rat, Holochilus brasiliensis LR/lc
      - Genus: Lundomys
        - Lund's amphibious rat, Lundomys molitor LR/lc
      - Genus: Necromys
        - Dark bolo mouse, Necromys obscurus LR/lc
      - Genus: Nectomys
        - Scaly-footed water rat, Nectomys squamipes LR/lc
      - Genus: Oligoryzomys
        - Yellow pygmy rice rat, Oligoryzomys flavescens LR/lc
        - Black-footed pygmy rice rat, Oligoryzomys nigripes LC
      - Genus: Oxymycterus
        - Long-nosed hocicudo, Oxymycterus nasutus LR/lc
        - Red hocicudo, Oxymycterus rufus LR/lc
      - Genus: Reithrodon
        - Bunny rat, Reithrodon auritus LR/lc
      - Genus: Scapteromys
        - Waterhouse's swamp rat, Scapteromys tumidus LR/lc
      - Genus: Wilfredomys
        - Greater Wilfred's mouse, Wilfredomys oenax LR/lc

==== Order: Chiroptera (bats) ====
The bats' most distinguishing feature is that their forelimbs are developed as wings, making them the only mammals capable of flight. Bat species account for about 20% of all mammals.

- Family: Noctilionidae
  - Genus: Noctilio
    - Lesser bulldog bat, Noctilio albiventris LR/lc
    - Greater bulldog bat, Noctilio leporinus LR/lc
- Family: Vespertilionidae
  - Subfamily: Myotinae
    - Genus: Myotis
      - Silver-tipped myotis, Myotis albescens LR/lc
      - Yellowish myotis, Myotis levis LR/lc
      - Riparian myotis, Myotis riparius LR/lc
  - Subfamily: Vespertilioninae
    - Genus: Eptesicus
      - Brazilian brown bat, Eptesicus brasiliensis LR/lc
      - Diminutive serotine, Eptesicus diminutus LR/lc
    - Genus: Histiotus
      - Strange big-eared brown bat, Histiotus alienus VU
      - Small big-eared brown bat, Histiotus montanus LR/lc
    - Genus: Lasiurus
      - Desert red bat, Lasiurus blossevillii LR/lc
      - Hoary bat, Lasiurus cinereus LR/lc
      - Southern yellow bat, Lasiurus ega LR/lc
- Family: Molossidae
  - Genus: Eumops
    - Dwarf bonneted bat, Eumops bonariensis LR/lc
  - Genus: Molossops
    - Dwarf dog-faced bat, Molossops temminckii LR/lc
  - Genus: Molossus
    - Velvety free-tailed bat, Molossus molossus LR/lc
  - Genus: Nyctinomops
    - Big free-tailed bat, Nyctinomops macrotis LR/lc
  - Genus: Tadarida
    - Mexican free-tailed bat, Tadarida brasiliensis LR/nt
- Family: Phyllostomidae
  - Subfamily: Stenodermatinae
    - Genus: Sturnira
      - Little yellow-shouldered bat, Sturnira lilium LR/lc
    - Genus: Platyrrhinus
      - White-lined broad-nosed bat, Platyrrhinus lineatus LR/lc
  - Subfamily: Desmodontinae
    - Genus: Desmodus
      - Common vampire bat, Desmodus rotundus LR/lc

==== Order: Cetacea (whales) ====
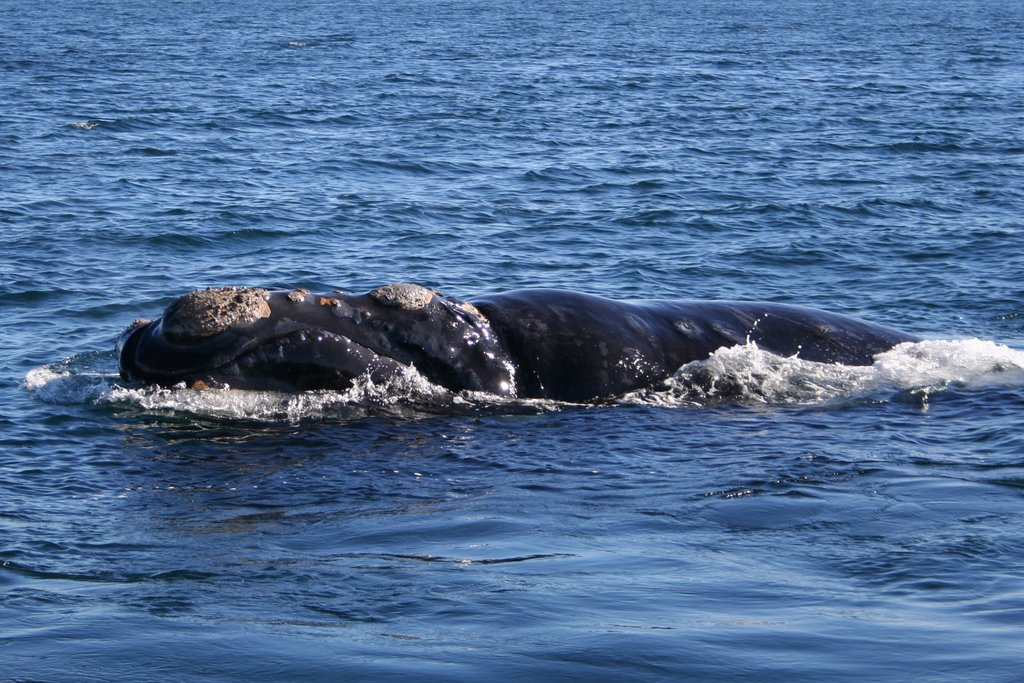
Southern right whale

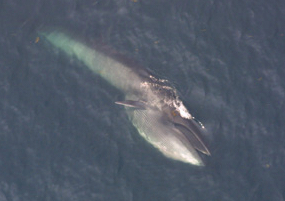
Sei whale

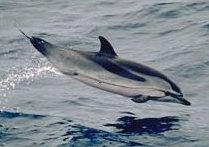
Striped dolphin

The order Cetacea includes whales, dolphins and porpoises. They are the mammals most fully adapted to aquatic life with a spindle-shaped nearly hairless body, protected by a thick layer of blubber, and forelimbs and tail modified to provide propulsion underwater.

- Suborder: Mysticeti
  - Family: Balaenidae
    - Genus: Eubalaena
      - Southern right whale, Eubalaena australis
  - Family: Balaenopteridae
    - Subfamily: Balaenopterinae
      - Genus: Balaenoptera
        - Common minke whale, Balaenoptera acutorostrata
        - Antarctic minke whale, Balaenoptera bonaerensis DD
        - Sei whale, Balaenoptera borealis EN
        - Bryde's whale, Balaenoptera brydei DD
        - Fin whale, Balaenoptera physalus EN
        - Blue whale, Balaenoptera musculus EN
      - Genus: Megaptera
        - Humpback whale, Megaptera novaeangliae LC
- Suborder: Odontoceti
  - Superfamily: Platanistoidea
    - Family: Pontoporiidae
      - Genus: Pontoporia
        - La Plata dolphin, Pontoporia blainvillei DD
    - Family: Phocoenidae
      - Genus: Phocoena
        - Spectacled porpoise, Phocoena dioptrica DD
        - Burmeister's porpoise, Phocoena spinipinnis DD
    - Family: Physeteridae
      - Genus: Physeter
        - Sperm whale, Physeter macrocephalus VU
    - Family: Kogiidae
      - Genus: Kogia
        - Pygmy sperm whale, K. breviceps DD
    - Family: Ziphidae
      - Genus: Ziphius
        - Cuvier's beaked whale, Ziphius cavirostris DD
      - Genus: Berardius
        - Arnoux's beaked whale, Berardius arnuxii
      - Subfamily: Hyperoodontinae
        - Genus: Hyperoodon
          - Southern bottlenose whale, Hyperoodon planifrons
        - Genus: Mesoplodon
          - Blainville's beaked whale, Mesoplodon densirostris DD
          - Gray's beaked whale, Mesoplodon grayi DD
          - Hector's beaked whale, Mesoplodon hectori DD
          - Strap-toothed whale, Mesoplodon layardii DD
    - Family: Delphinidae (marine dolphins)
      - Genus: Steno
        - Rough-toothed dolphin, Steno bredanensis DD
      - Genus: Tursiops
        - Common bottlenose dolphin, Tursiops truncatus DD
      - Genus: Stenella
        - Pantropical spotted dolphin, Stenella attenuata
        - Atlantic spotted dolphin, Stenella frontalis DD
        - Striped dolphin, Stenella coeruleoalba
        - Spinner dolphin, Stenella longirostris
      - Genus: Delphinus
        - Long-beaked common dolphin, Delphinus capensis
      - Genus: Lagenodelphis
        - Fraser's dolphin, Lagenodelphis hosei
      - Genus: Grampus
        - Risso's dolphin, Grampus griseus
      - Genus: Lissodelphis
        - Southern right whale dolphin, Lissodelphis peronii DD
      - Genus: Feresa
        - Pygmy killer whale, Feresa attenuata DD
      - Genus: Pseudorca
        - False killer whale, Pseudorca crassidens
      - Genus: Orcinus
        - Orca, O. orca DD
      - Genus: Globicephala
        - Long-finned pilot whale, Globicephala melas DD
        - Short-finned pilot whale, Globicephala macrorhynchus DD

==== Order: Artiodactyla (even-toed ungulates) ====
The even-toed ungulates are ungulates whose weight is borne about equally by the third and fourth toes, rather than mostly or entirely by the third as in perissodactyls. There are about 220 artiodactyl species, including many that are of great economic importance to humans.

- Family: Tayassuidae (peccaries)
  - Genus: Dicotyles
    - Collared peccary, Dicotyles tajacu LC
- Family: Cervidae (deer)
  - Subfamily: Capreolinae
    - Genus: Blastocerus
      - Marsh deer, Blastocerus dichotomus VU extirpated
    - Genus: Mazama
      - Gray brocket, Mazama gouazoupira LC
    - Genus: Ozotoceros
      - Pampas deer, Ozotoceros bezoarticus NT
  - Subfamily: Cervinae
    - Genus: Dama
      - European fallow deer, D. dama LC introduced

=== Infraclass: Metatheria ===
==== Order: Didelphimorphia (common opossums) ====
Didelphimorphia is the order of common opossums of the Western Hemisphere. Opossums probably diverged from the basic South American marsupials in the late Cretaceous or early Paleocene. They are small to medium-sized marsupials, about the size of a large house cat, with a long snout and prehensile tail.

- Family: Didelphidae (American opossums)
  - Subfamily: Didelphinae
    - Genus: Didelphis
      - White-eared opossum, Didelphis albiventris LR/lc
    - Genus: Gracilinanus
      - Agile gracile opossum, Gracilinanus agilis LR/nt
    - Genus: Lutreolina
      - Big lutrine opossum, Lutreolina crassicaudata LR/lc
    - Genus: Monodelphis
      - Yellow-sided opossum, Monodelphis dimidiata LR/nt

== See also ==
- Fauna of Uruguay
- List of chordate orders
- Lists of mammals by region
- List of prehistoric mammals
- Mammal classification
- List of mammals described in the 2000s
