= Marsh rat =

Marsh rat can refer to several not closely related types of semiaquatic rodents of superfamily Muroidea:

- Dasymys, about ten species from Africa in the family Muridae;
  - African marsh rat or common dasymys (D. incomtus)
  - Angolan marsh rat (D. nudipes)
- Holochilus, three species from South America in the family Cricetidae;
  - Amazonian marsh rat, common marsh rat or simply the marsh rat (H. sciureus)
  - Brazilian marsh rat or web-footed marsh rat (H. brasiliensis)
  - Chacoan marsh rat (H. chacarius)
- Greater marsh rat (Lundomys molitor), a cricetid from southeastern South America;
- Marsh rice rat (Oryzomys palustris), a cricetid from southeastern North America.
