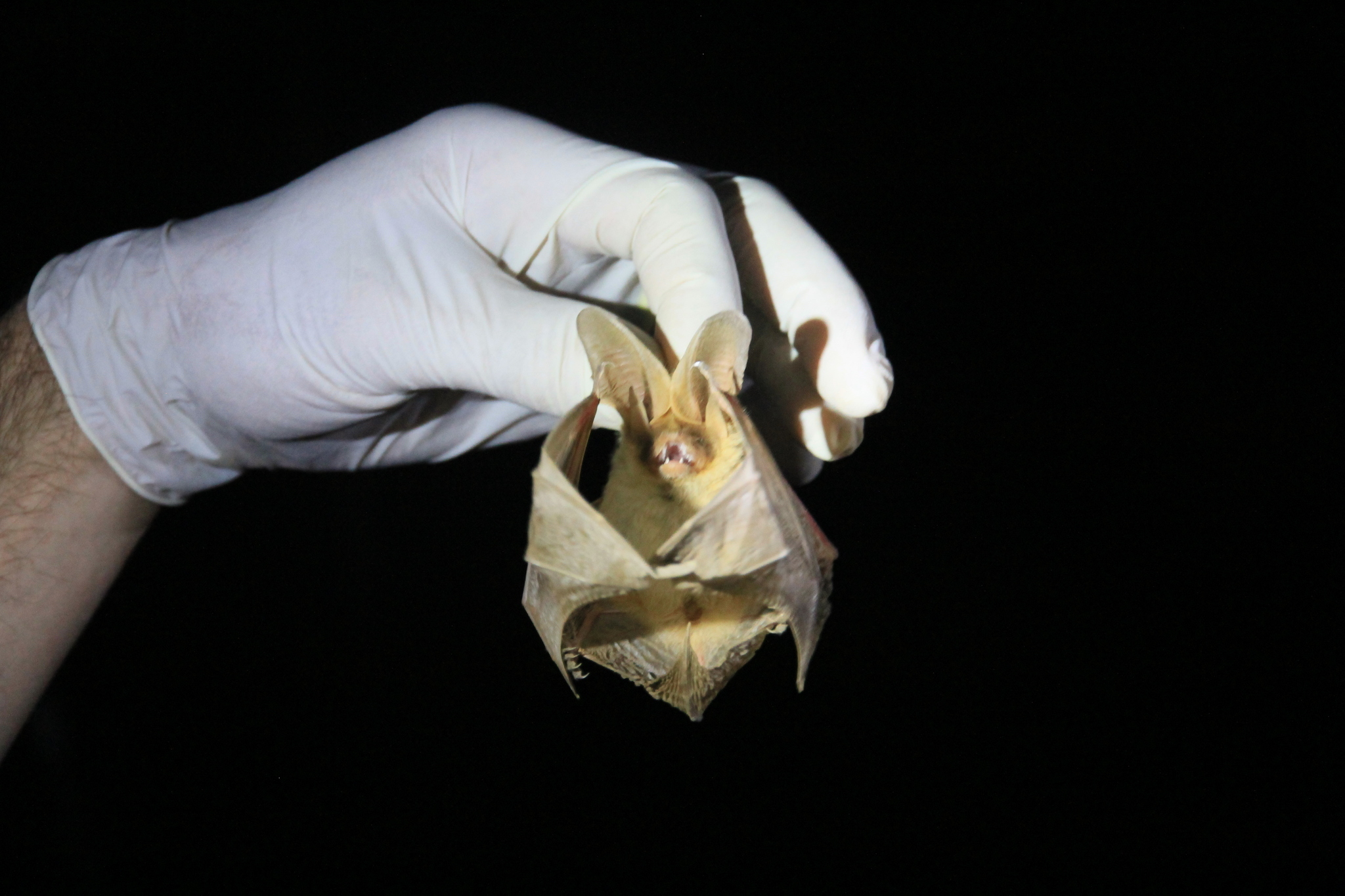

Conservation status
- Least Concern (IUCN 3.1)

Scientific classification
- Kingdom: Animalia
- Phylum: Chordata
- Class: Mammalia
- Order: Chiroptera
- Family: Vespertilionidae
- Genus: Histiotus
- Species: H. laephotis

Binomial name
- Histiotus laephotis Thomas, 1916
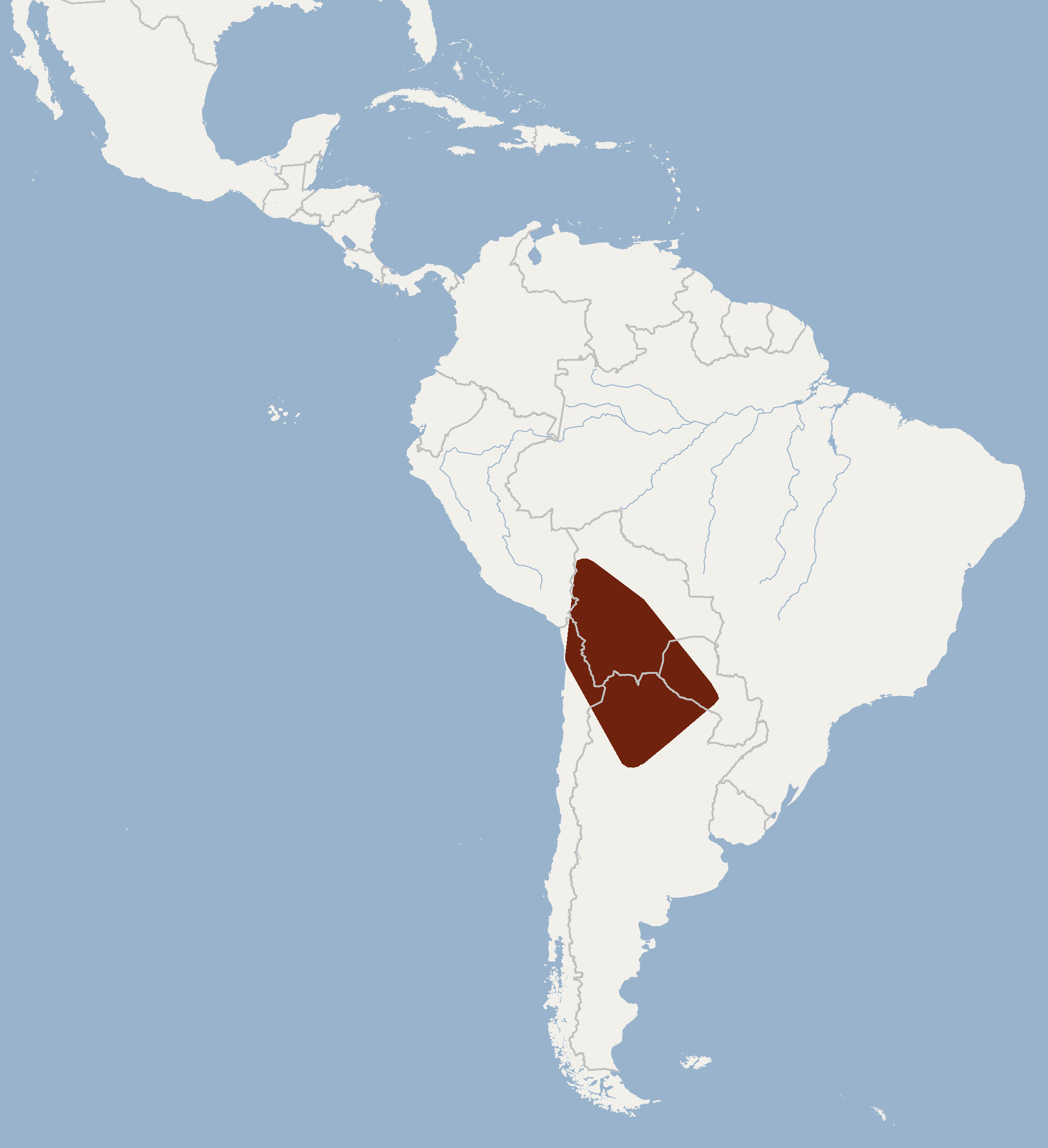

= Thomas's big-eared brown bat =

Species of bat

Thomas's big-eared brown bat (Histiotus laephotis) is a species of vesper bat found in South America.

== Taxonomy and etymology ==
Thomas's big-eared brown bat was described as a new species in 1916 by British zoologist Oldfield Thomas. Thomas described the species based on specimens held by the Turin Museum of Natural History that had been collected by "Dr. Borelli", likely Dr. Alfredo Borelli, who furnished many biological specimens during this time from Argentina, Paraguay, and Bolivia. The holotype had been collected in Caiza, Bolivia, which is located in the Potosí Department of Southern Bolivia. Of the species name "laephotis", Thomas was not clear on its meaning, though he remarked that it "[had] a similar meaning" to the name histiotus, which means "sail ear" (from Ancient Greek "ἱστός" meaning "mast" + "οὖς" meaning "ear"). A hypothesis for the etymology of laephotis is that it comes from Greek "λαιός" meaning "awkward" and "φως" meaning "light," possibly referring to an awkward flight in the daylight.

The validity of Thomas's big-eared brown bat as a species has been disputed. In the past, it has been regarded as a subspecies of the big-eared brown bat, H. macrotis. More recently, it has been considered a subspecies of the small big-eared brown bat, H. montanus. At present, several sources consider it a valid species.

== Description ==
Individuals weight approximately 11 g (0.39 oz). Its ears are very long relative to other members of its genus, at 32–33 mm (1.3–1.3 in) long. The ears are 23–24 mm (0.91–0.94 in) wide. Its fur is dark brown, with the tips of individual hairs lighter brown. Its ears and flight membranes are grayish in color. Its forearm is 46–51 mm (1.8–2.0 in) long. From head to tail, it is 104 mm (4.1 in) long. Its tail is 50 mm (2.0 in); its tragus is 11 mm (0.43 in) long. It can be differentiated from the similar small big-eared brown bat (Histiotus montanus) by its yellowish fur, pale ears, and longer forearm.

== Range and habitat ==
Its range includes Peru, Bolivia, and Argentina. In March 2006, it was documented in Brazil for the first time. A paper published in 2015 cited its first ever documentation in Chile.

== Conservation ==
As of 2019, it was evaluated as near-threatened by the IUCN.
