= Moche big-eared brown bat =

Scientific classification
- Kingdom: Animalia
- Phylum: Chordata
- Class: Mammalia
- Order: Chiroptera
- Family: Vespertilionidae
- Genus: Histiotus
- Species: H. mochica

Binomial name
- Histiotus mochica Velazco, Almeida, Cláudio, Giménez, & Giannini, 2021

Species of bat

The Moche big-eared brown bat (Histiotus mochica) is a species of vesper bat in the family Vespertilionidae. It is endemic to coastal Peru. It is notable for its likely depiction in Moche ceramics over a millennium prior to its discovery to Western science in 2012 and scientific description in 2021.

== Taxonomy ==
It is thought to be the sister species to the Humboldt big-eared brown bat (H. humboldti).

== Distribution ==
It is restricted to the Peruvian desert, alongside several other bat species uniquely adapted to the harsh and arid habitat. This habitat also coincides with the historic extent of the Moche culture.

== Description ==
It can be distinguished from other members of the genus Histiotus by its unique ears as well as its uniform brown pelage, in contrast to the multicolored pelage of other Histiotus species.

== Discovery and significance ==
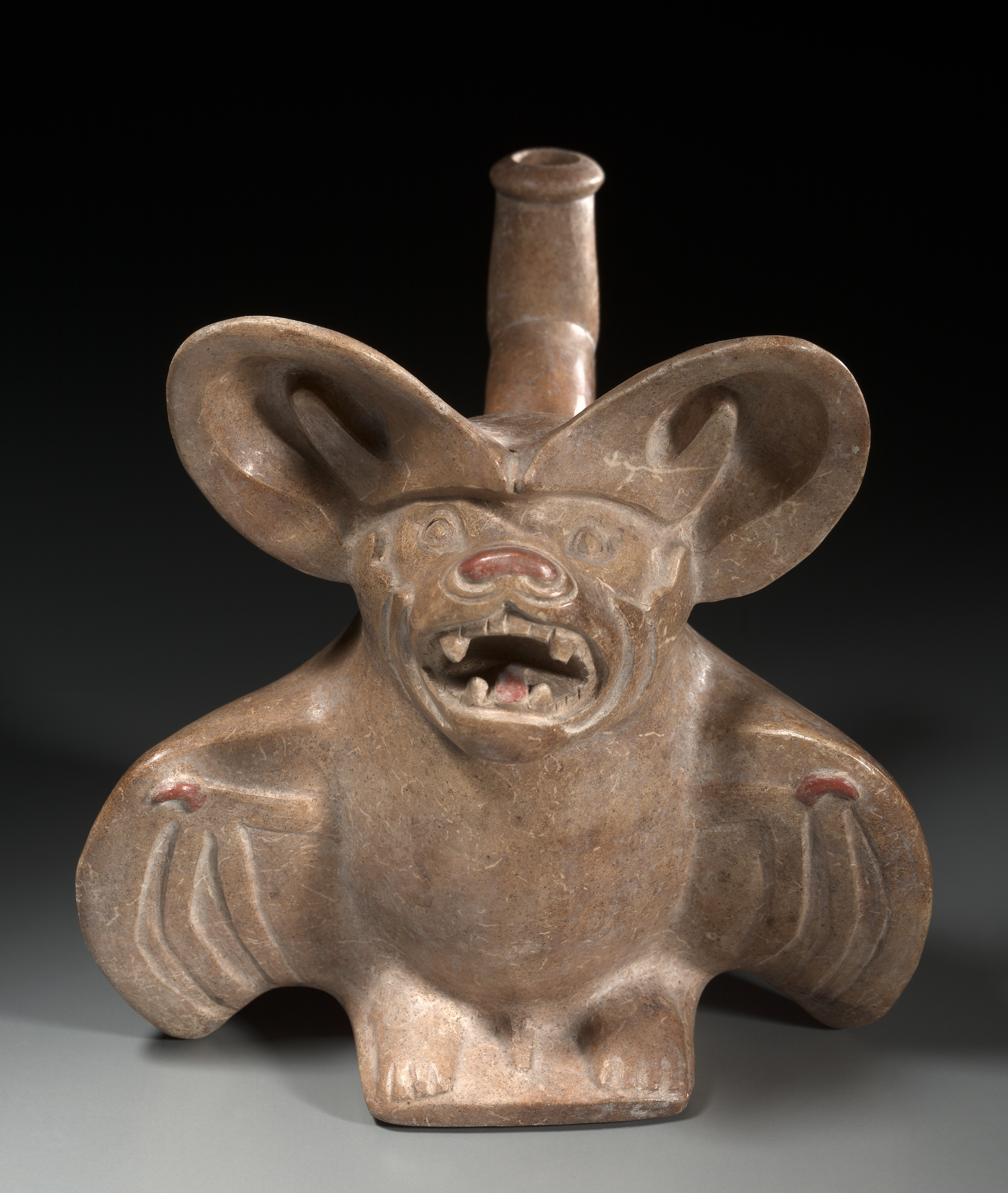
Moche ceramic at the Cleveland Museum of Art likely depicting this species.

Bats were frequently represented in Moche artwork, and are thought to have been culturally significant, being associated with the moon and ancestor worship. Many ceramics depicting bats (among other animals) are known, likely intended to hold daily and ritual fluids. One such vessel, currently held by the Cleveland Museum of Art, depicts a bat with large ears connected by a band of membrane across the forehead and no nose-leaf, which are key traits of the genus Histiotus. However, for a significant period of time, no Histiotus was known from the region formerly inhabited by the Moche.

In 2012, an unknown Histiotus was documented in Piura Department, with two specimens being collected. Further studies found it to represent a distinctive, previously-undescribed species, and during research it was connected to the Moche pottery of the unknown Histiotus. It was ultimately described as Histiotus mochica in 2021, being named after the culture that had documented well before its discovery to Western science.

== See also ==
- List of living mammal species described in the 2020s
