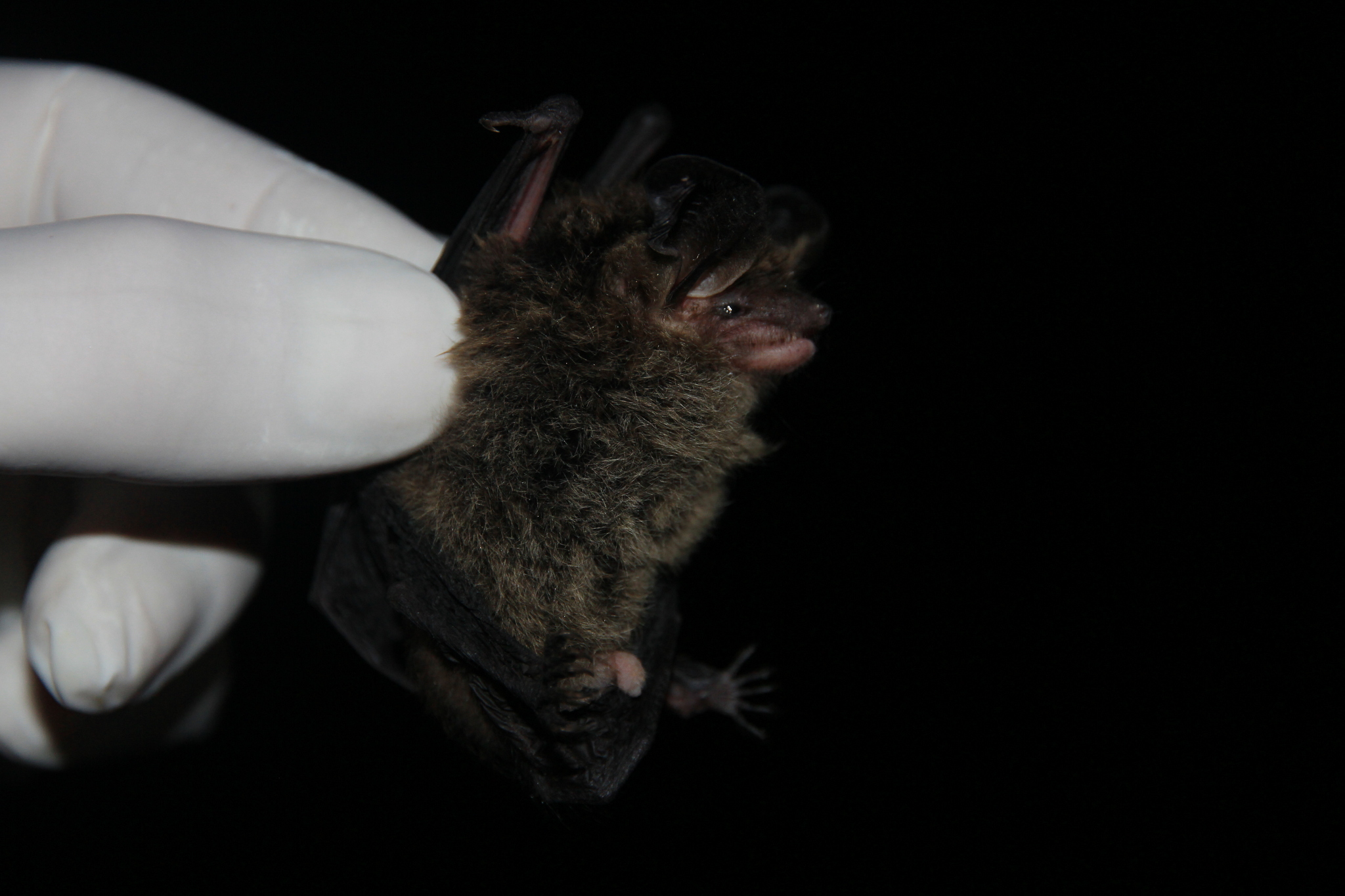

Conservation status
- Least Concern (IUCN 3.1)

Scientific classification
- Kingdom: Animalia
- Phylum: Chordata
- Class: Mammalia
- Order: Chiroptera
- Family: Vespertilionidae
- Genus: Histiotus
- Species: H. magellanicus

Binomial name
- Histiotus magellanicus Philippi, 1866

Synonyms
- H. capucinus (Philippi, 1866); H. montanus magellanicus (Philippi, 1866)

= Southern big-eared brown bat =

Species of bat

The southern big-eared brown bat (Histiotus magellanicus) is a species of bat from the family Vespertilionidae. Although current taxonomy treats the southern big-eared brown bat as a separate species, it is often treated as a subspecies of the small big-eared brown bat. It lives in the forests of southern Argentina and Chile; though the population of the bat in the southern part of its habitat is low, there are no major concerns to justify anything lower than a Least Concern rating in the IUCN Red List.

== Description ==
This is a small bat, with a total length of 10 to 12 centimetres (3.9 to 4.7 in) and a wingspan of about 31 centimetres (12 in). Adults weigh from 10 to 18 grams (0.35 to 0.63 oz). The fur is soft and dark brown in colour across the whole of the body, allowing it to be distinguished from other members of the same genus which much paler, often whitish, underparts. The ears are large and moderately elongated with a well-developed tragus and are separated on the head, rather than being connected by a band of skin as in some closely related species. The skin of the ears and wing membranes is very dark brown.

== Distribution and habitat ==
This is one of the most southerly bat species in the world, and is endemic to Chile and western and southern Argentina. In the north, it reaches as far as the southern part of the Maule Region in Chile, from which it is found southwards across Chile and neighbouring parts of Argentina as far as the Magellan Straits. South of the mainland, it is found across the whole of Tierra del Fuego, almost as far as Cape Horn. It is found primarily in forests, especially those dominated by southern beech trees, but has also been recorded from Matorral shrubland and Andean steppe country.

== Biology and behaviour ==
Bats in the genus Histiotus have the largest hearts, relative to body size, of any studied mammal. At 2.18% of total body mass, their hearts are about 63% larger than would be expected. The echolocation calls of the southern big-eared brown bat are medium broadband signals, lasting about 10 ms and sweeping down from 40 to 30 kHz. Breeding takes place in the summer, with lactating females having been recorded in November and December.

Very little is known of the species' behaviour, but the bats are known to occasionally use natural cavities in standing dead trees or large living trees as roosting sites. This reliance on trees may mean that the recent introduction of beavers to Tierra del Fuego could post a future risk to the species.

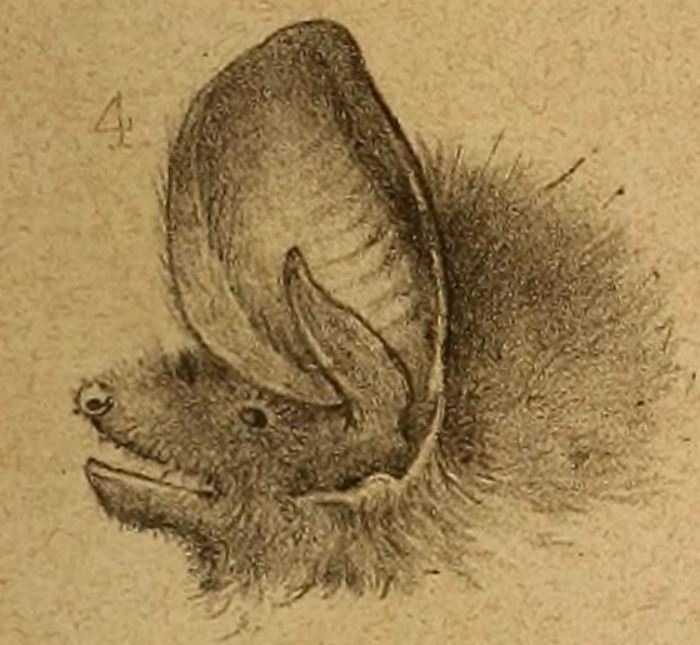
Head of H. magellanicus as illustrated in a monthly report of the Royal Prussian Academy of Sciences
