= Oligoryzomys stramineus =

Conservation status
- Least Concern (IUCN 3.1)

Scientific classification
- Kingdom: Animalia
- Phylum: Chordata
- Class: Mammalia
- Order: Rodentia
- Family: Cricetidae
- Subfamily: Sigmodontinae
- Genus: Oligoryzomys
- Species: O. stramineus

Binomial name
- Oligoryzomys stramineus Bonvicino & Weksler, 1998

Species of rodent

Oligoryzomys stramineus, also known as the straw-colored colilargo or straw-colored pygmy rice rat, is a species of rodent in the genus Oligoryzomys of the family Cricetidae. It occurs only in the cerrado and caatinga ecoregions of northeastern Brazil. Its karyotype has 2n = 52 and FNa = 68-70.

== Description ==
Oligoryzomys stramineus is a large species of colilargo with a yellowish-brown head and dorsal surface and whitish underparts, with a sharp line demarcating the boundary between the two. It has long incisive foramina (openings in the hard palate of the skull) and broad zygomatic plates (bony plates in the upper jaw). The head-and-body length averages 94 mm (3.70 in) while the tail averages 118 mm (4.65 in).

== Distribution and habitat ==
This species is native to South America where it occurs in northeastern and central Brazil. Its range extends from the cerrado ecoregion of the states of northern Goiás and northern Minas Gerais southward to the caatinga ecoregion of the states of Paraíba and Pernambuco. In the cerrado, it has mainly been found in gallery forests. It shares part of its range in central Brazil with Oligoryzomys fornesi and is sometimes caught in the same line of traps. It is also sympatric with Oligoryzomys nigripes, but the two species are not found in the same trap-lines.

== Ecology ==
Little is known of the breeding habits of O. stramineus; a pregnant female carrying four young was caught in September; and a juvenile was caught in August suggesting that mating may have occurred in June or July.

== Status ==
O. stramineus has a wide range, and though its total population is not known, it is considered to be common and its population stable. No particular threats have been identified and the International Union for Conservation of Nature has rated its conservation status as being of "least concern".

== Literature cited ==
- Musser, G. G.; Carleton, M. D. (2005). "Superfamily Muroidea". In Wilson, D. E.; Reeder, D. M. (eds.). Mammal Species of the World: A Taxonomic and Geographic Reference (3rd ed.). Johns Hopkins University Press. pp. 894–1531. ISBN 978-0-8018-8221-0. OCLC 62265494.
