= Straw (colour) =

Color; tone of yellow

Colour coordinates
- Hex triplet: #E4D96F
- sRGB^{B} (r, g, b): (228, 217, 111)
- HSV (h, s, v): (54°, 51%, 89%)
- CIELCh_{uv} (L, C, h): (86, 69, 80°)
- Source: Maerz and Paul
- ISCC–NBS descriptor: Brilliant greenish yellow
- B: Normalized to [0–255] (byte)

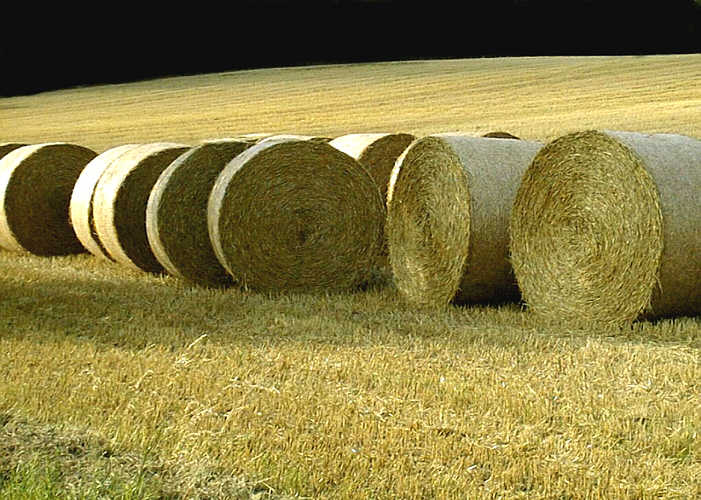
Large round bales of straw

Straw /ˈstrɔː/ is a colour, a tone of pale yellow, the colour of straw. The Latin word stramineus, with the same meaning, is often used in describing nature.

The first recorded use of straw as a colour name in English was in 1589.

== Straw in nature ==
The name of the colour straw is used as an adjective in the names of birds and other animals with such colouring to describe their appearance, including:

Invertebrates

- Barred straw
- Straw underwing

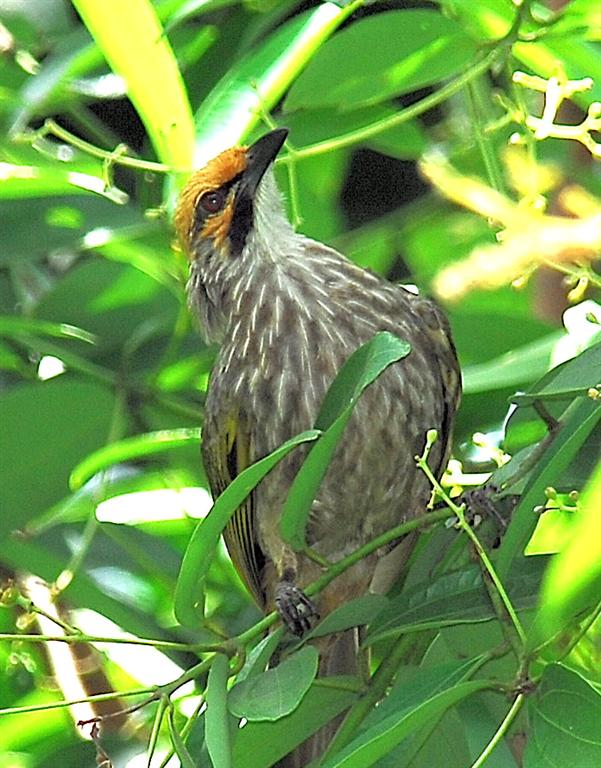
Straw-headed bulbul

Birds

- Straw-backed tanager
- Straw-headed bulbul
- Straw-tailed whydah

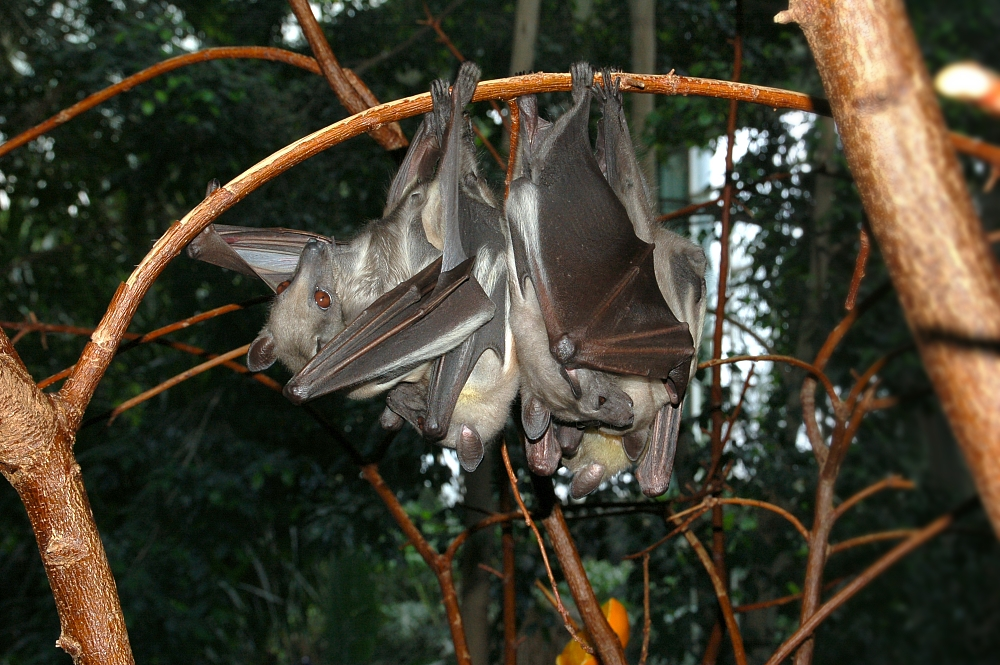
Straw-coloured fruit bat

Mammals

- Straw-coloured fruit bat
- Straw-coloured pygmy rice rat

Other

- Blood plasma is also straw coloured

== See also ==
- List of colours
