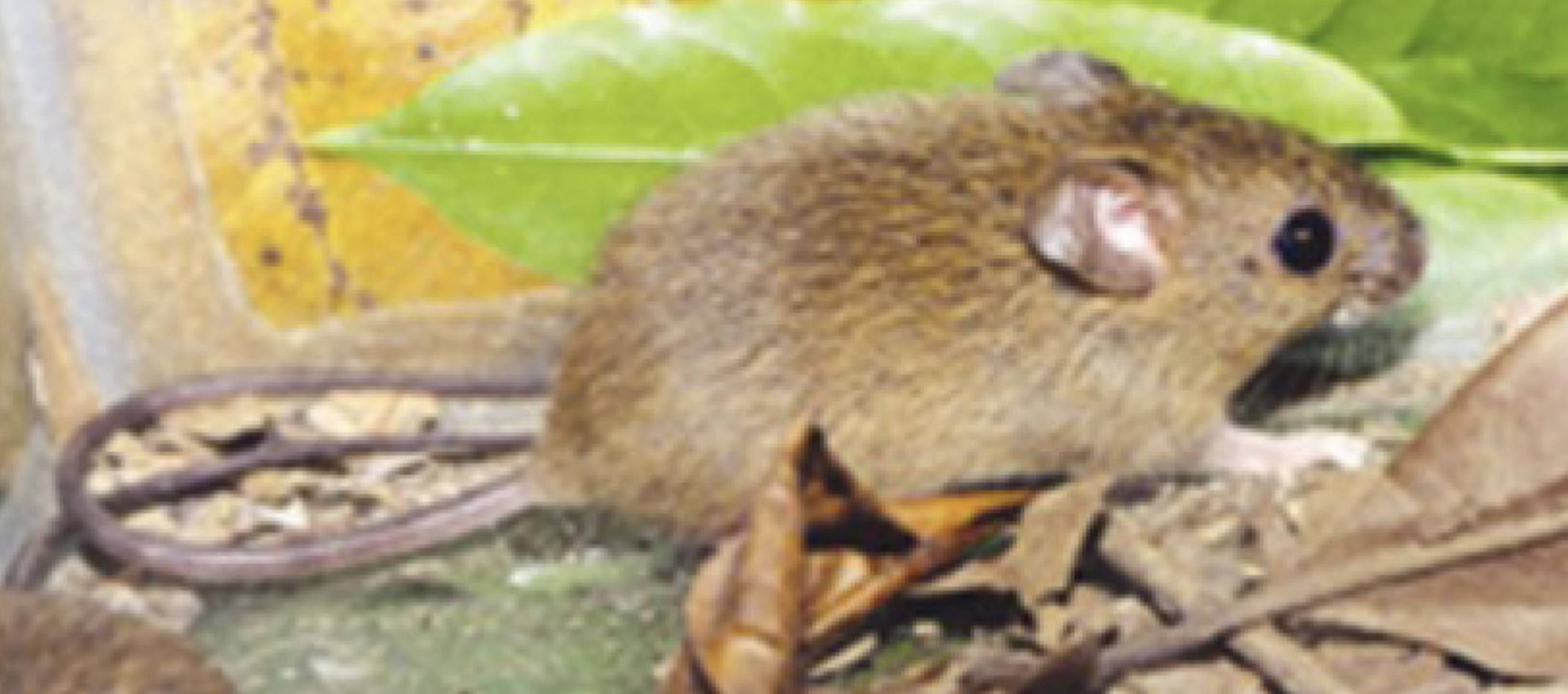

Conservation status
- Least Concern (IUCN 3.1)

Scientific classification
- Kingdom: Animalia
- Phylum: Chordata
- Class: Mammalia
- Infraclass: Placentalia
- Order: Rodentia
- Family: Cricetidae
- Subfamily: Sigmodontinae
- Genus: Oligoryzomys
- Species: O. microtis

Binomial name
- Oligoryzomys microtis Allen, 1916

= Oligoryzomys microtis =

Species of rodent in South America

Oligoryzomys microtis, also known as the small-eared colilargo or small-eared pygmy rice rat, is a species of rodent in the genus Oligoryzomys of family Cricetidae. It is found in western Brazil, eastern Peru, Bolivia, and northern Paraguay.

== Description ==
Oligoryzomys microtis has a total length of 188 mm (7.4 in) including a tail of 106 mm (4.2 in). It weighs about 18 g (0.63 oz) and is the smallest species in the genus. In proportion to the head and body length, the hind feet are relatively long, being 28.5% of their length. This compares with the rather similar Oligoryzomys nigripes where the proportion is 24.5%. The ears are small and densely furred inside. The cheeks may be grey or orangeish-brown. The back is brownish and the underparts are whitish or greyish, sometimes tinged with buff. The tail is rather darker on the upper surface than the lower surface.

Its karyotype has 2n = 64 and FNa = 66.

== Distribution and habitat ==
O. microtis is native to South America, its range extending from northwestern Brazil, south of the Solimões River and Amazon River, to the adjoining lowlands of Peru and Bolivia, northern Argentina, eastern Paraguay and the Gran Chaco plain. Its typical habitat is marshes and wet grassland, but in Brazil it is more associated with forest borders, gallery woodland and secondary forest. In the Paraguayan Chaco it is associated with both dry and wet marshland, and has been reported from floating masses of vegetation.

== Ecology ==
Breeding starts at a young age, even while still in juvenile coat, and pregnancy rates are high. In Bolivia, pregnant females have been found in March, May, August and September, and the number of embryos varied from two to eight. The Rio Mamore virus has been isolated from this species in Bolivia.

== Status ==
This is a common species over much of its wide range. It is an adaptable species, able to tolerate some habitat degradation. No particular threats have been recognised and the population seems to be stable, so the International Union for Conservation of Nature has rated its conservation status as being of least concern.
