= Oligoryzomys victus =

Conservation status
- Extinct (c. 1892) (IUCN 3.1)

Scientific classification
- Kingdom: Animalia
- Phylum: Chordata
- Class: Mammalia
- Order: Rodentia
- Family: Cricetidae
- Subfamily: Sigmodontinae
- Genus: Oligoryzomys
- Species: †O. victus

Binomial name
- †Oligoryzomys victus (Thomas, 1898)

Synonyms
- Oryzomys victus Thomas, 1898

Extinct species of rodent

Oligoryzomys victus, also known as the St. Vincent colilargo or St. Vincent pygmy rice rat, was a species of rodent in the genus Oligoryzomys of the oryzomyine tribe. Only one specimen is known, which was collected on Saint Vincent in the Lesser Antilles in about 1892, and it is now presumed extinct.

== Taxonomy ==
The only known specimen was collected by Herbert Huntingdon Smith at an unknown location on Saint Vincent and later presented to the Natural History Museum, London, where it was registered as specimen BMNH 97.12.26.1. In 1898, Oldfield Thomas described the specimen as the holotype of a new species of Oryzomys which he named Oryzomys victus. Although Thomas placed it close to species now placed in Oligoryzomys, later compilators considered the affinities of O. victus as unknown; one study placed it in the Oryzomys tectus group (more or less = Oecomys). In his 1962 study of Antillean oryzomyines, however, American paleontologist Clayton Ray reaffirmed its affinities with Oligoryzomys, but he was unable to resolve its relation within the genus. On the one hand, he saw closer morphological similarities to small Oligoryzomys such as O. fulvescens and O. delicatus, but on the other hand larger species such as O. longicaudatus are closer in size. Ray also considered the possibility that the St. Vincent population was in fact introduced from a still unknown mainland species, but considered this unlikely; no such species has since been found.

== Description ==
The holotype, a fluid-preserved adult female with the skull extracted, was described in Thomas' original description and in Ray's 1962 restudy. It is a relatively large Oligoryzomys and has the pelage dark reddish above and buffy white below. The short ears are brown in color. The tail nearly lacks hairs and is brown above and somewhat paler below. Like most oryzomyines, it has eight mammae, including a pectoral pair. The head and body length is 96 mm (3.8 in), the tail length 121 mm (4.8 in), the hind foot length (without claws) 25 mm (0.98 in), the ear length 14 mm (0.55 in), the greatest length of the skull 27.2 mm (1.07 in), the length of the upper molars is 3.9 mm (0.15 in), and the length of the lower molars is 4.0 mm (0.16 in).

== Behaviour ==
Little is known about the habits or the ecology of O. victus; in fact, the only direct information is a collector's note which calls it a "forest rat". Its morphology suggests that it was not arboreal or fossorial.

== Extinction ==
The extinction of O. victus may be associated with the introduction of the small Asian mongoose to St. Vincent in the 1870s. Ray suggests that the rice rat was an easier prey for the mongoose than introduced Rattus, which may have become partly arboreal, thus creating a competitive disadvantage for the rice rat. Any remaining populations may have been wiped out when the Soufrière erupted in 1902, destroying the pristine vegetation on its slopes.

== Literature cited ==
- Musser, G. G.; Carleton, M. D. (2005). "Superfamily Muroidea". In Wilson, D. E.; Reeder, D. M. (eds.). Mammal Species of the World: A Taxonomic and Geographic Reference (3rd ed.). Johns Hopkins University Press. p. 1144. ISBN 978-0-8018-8221-0. OCLC 62265494.
- Ray, C.E. 1962. The Oryzomyine Rodents of the Antillean Subregion. Doctor of Philosophy thesis, Harvard University, 211 pp.
