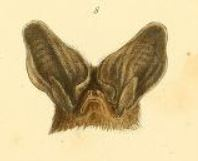

Conservation status
- Data Deficient (IUCN 3.1)

Scientific classification
- Domain: Eukaryota
- Kingdom: Animalia
- Phylum: Chordata
- Class: Mammalia
- Order: Chiroptera
- Family: Vespertilionidae
- Genus: Histiotus
- Species: H. velatus

Binomial name
- Histiotus velatus Geoffroy, 1824

= Tropical big-eared brown bat =

Species of bat

The tropical big-eared brown bat (Histiotus velatus), is a bat species found in Bolivia, Peru, Argentina, Brazil and Paraguay.
