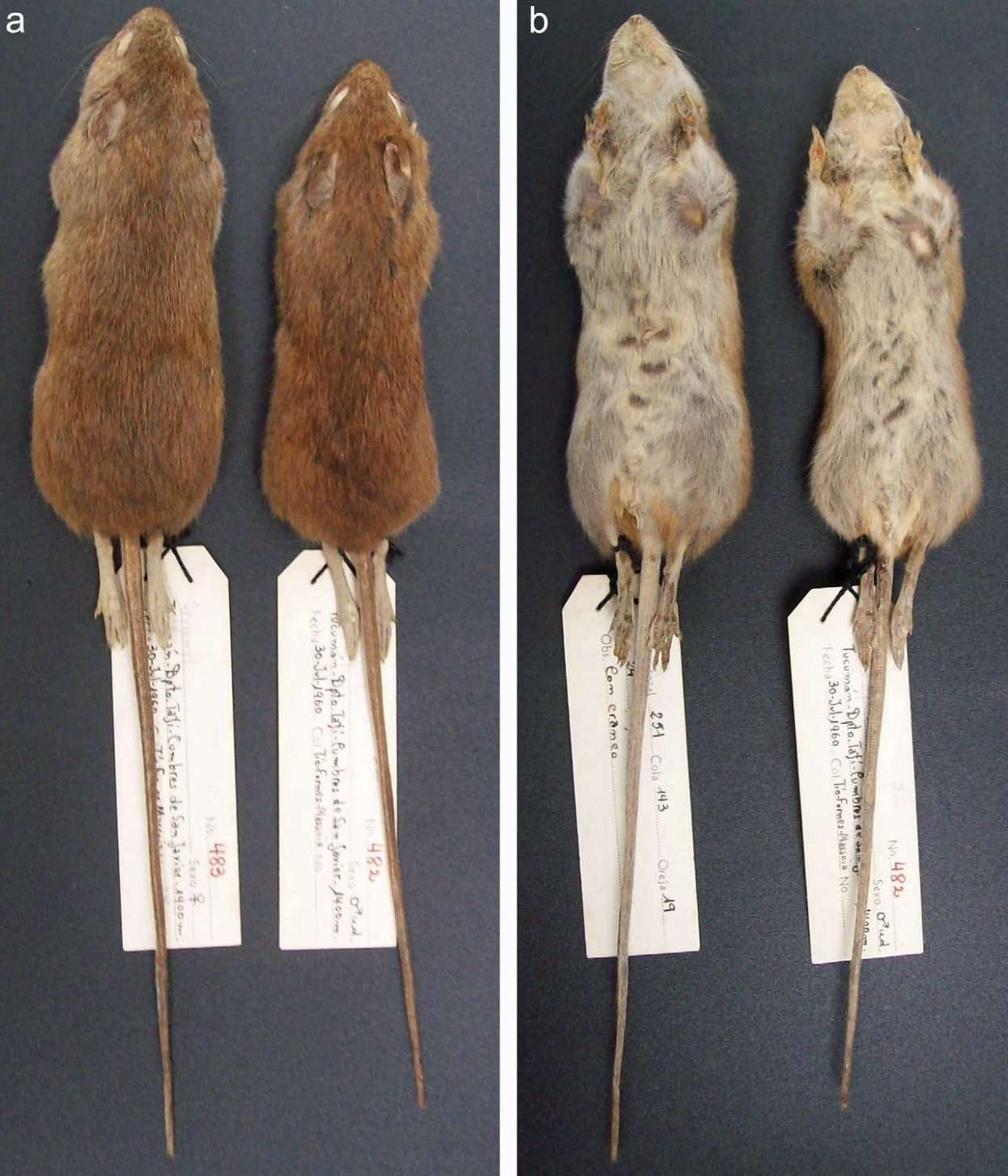

Conservation status
- Data Deficient (IUCN 3.1)

Scientific classification
- Kingdom: Animalia
- Phylum: Chordata
- Class: Mammalia
- Order: Rodentia
- Family: Cricetidae
- Subfamily: Sigmodontinae
- Genus: Oligoryzomys
- Species: O. brendae

Binomial name
- Oligoryzomys brendae Massoia, 1998

= Oligoryzomys brendae =

Species of rodent

Oligoryzomys brendae, also known as Brenda's colilargo, is a South American species of rodent in the genus Oligoryzomys. It is found only in Tucumán Province in northwestern Argentina, but its taxonomic status requires revision.

== Literature cited ==
- Jayat, J.; Pardinas, U. (2019). "Oligoryzomys brendae". IUCN Red List of Threatened Species. 2019 e.T136530A22357713.
- Musser, G. G.; Carleton, M. D. (2005). "Superfamily Muroidea". In Wilson, D. E.; Reeder, D. M. (eds.). Mammal Species of the World: A Taxonomic and Geographic Reference (3rd ed.). Johns Hopkins University Press. p. 1140. ISBN 978-0-8018-8221-0. OCLC 62265494.
