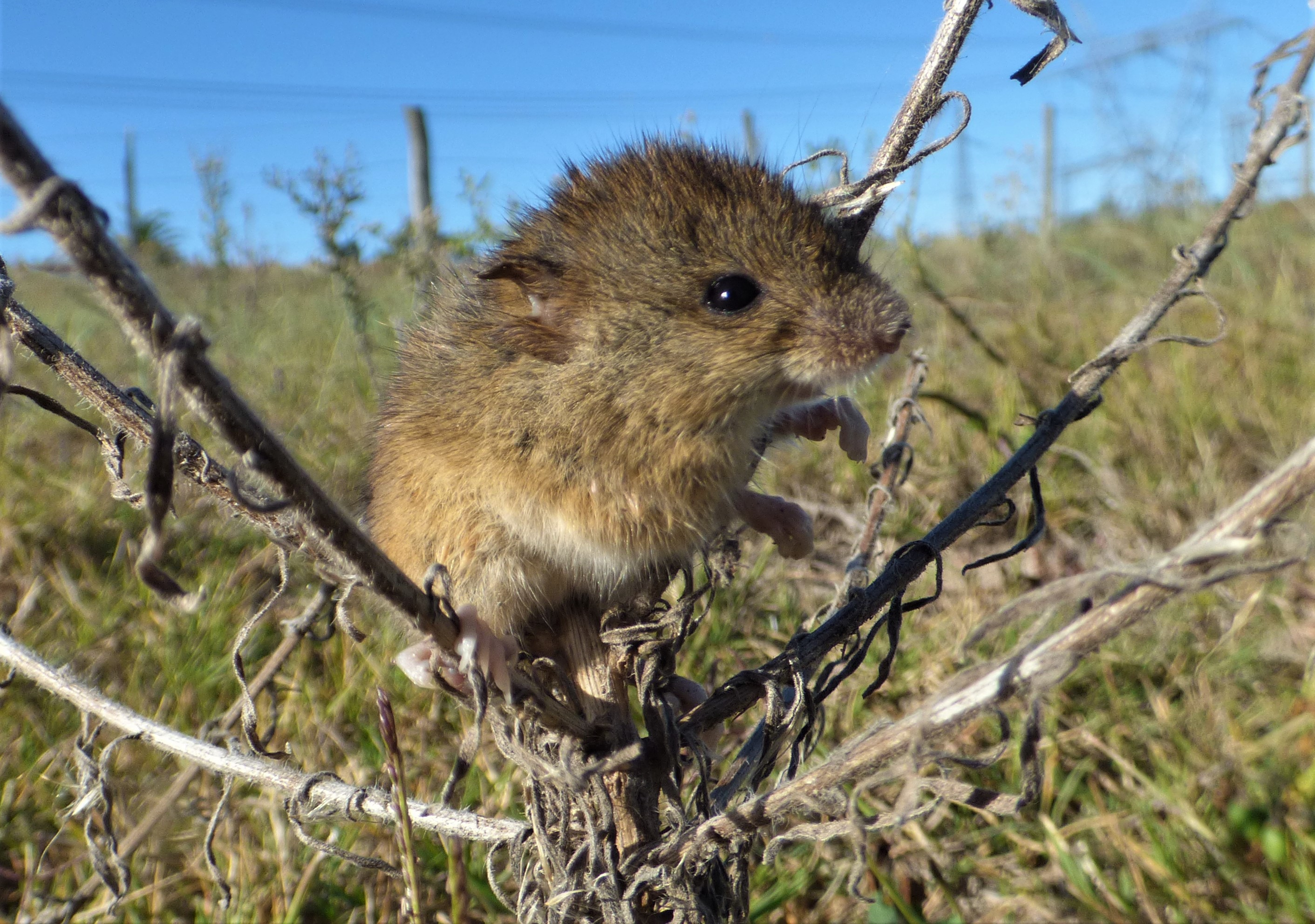

Conservation status
- Least Concern (IUCN 3.1)

Scientific classification
- Kingdom: Animalia
- Phylum: Chordata
- Class: Mammalia
- Order: Rodentia
- Family: Cricetidae
- Subfamily: Sigmodontinae
- Genus: Oligoryzomys
- Species: O. flavescens

Binomial name
- Oligoryzomys flavescens (Waterhouse, 1837)

= Oligoryzomys flavescens =

Species of rodent

Oligoryzomys flavescens, also known as the flavescent colilargo or yellow pygmy rice rat is a species of rodent in the genus Oligoryzomys of family Cricetidae. It is found in southern South America, occurring in southern Brazil, Paraguay, Uruguay, and northeastern Argentina. Its karyotype has 2n = 64-66 and FNa = 66–70.

== Description ==
The dorsal fur of Oligoryzomys flavescens consists of bright orangish-brown hairs mixed with blackish hairs, the hairs on the flanks are all orange and the underparts are yellowish-grey. The boundary between the upper parts and the underparts is indistinct, grading from one colour to the other. The head-and-body length averages 87 mm (3.43 in) and the tails averages 110 mm (4.33 in). Skull features that distinguish this species include the long incisive foramina (openings in the hard palate) that usually reach the first molar, and the short mesopterygoid fossa (a depression behind the end of the palate) which does not extend as far as the third molar.

== Distribution ==
O. flavescens is native to South America. It occurs in eastern Brazil, Uruguay, eastern Paraguay and northern and central Argentina. It is found in a variety of habitats, often near water, from sea level up to about 1,800 m (5,900 ft). These include pampas, scrubland, primary and secondary forests, marshes, agricultural land, and gallery forests in the cerrado.

== Ecology ==
O. flavescens is the principal reservoir host of certain hantaviruses, which are harmless to rodents but cause disease in humans.

== Status ==
The International Union for Conservation of Nature has rated the conservation status of O. flavescens as being of "least concern". This is on the basis that it has a wide range, is presumed to have a large total population, occurs in several protected areas and tolerates some degree of disturbance to its habitat.

== Literature cited ==
- Musser, G. G.; Carleton, M. D. (2005). "Superfamily Muroidea". In Wilson, D. E.; Reeder, D. M. (eds.). Mammal Species of the World: A Taxonomic and Geographic Reference (3rd ed.). Johns Hopkins University Press. pp. 894–1531. ISBN 978-0-8018-8221-0. OCLC 62265494.
