= Oligoryzomys magellanicus =

Conservation status
- Least Concern (IUCN 3.1)

Scientific classification
- Kingdom: Animalia
- Phylum: Chordata
- Class: Mammalia
- Order: Rodentia
- Family: Cricetidae
- Subfamily: Sigmodontinae
- Genus: Oligoryzomys
- Species: O. magellanicus

Binomial name
- Oligoryzomys magellanicus (Bennett, 1836)

Species of rodent

Oligoryzomys magellanicus, also known as the Patagonian colilargo and the Magellanic pygmy rice rat, is a species of rodent in the genus Oligoryzomys of the family Cricetidae. It is found in the southernmost parts of Argentina and Chile, including Tierra del Fuego and other outlying islands. Its karyotype has 2n = 54 and FNa = 66.

== Taxonomy ==
There has been discussion as to whether Oligoryzomys magellanicus should be regarded as a full species or whether it should be considered to be a subspecies of Oligoryzomys longicaudatus. Milton H. Gallardo and Eduardo Palma (1990) recognised it as a valid species, basing their findings on "phallic morphology and karyotypic and morphometric data".

== Description ==
The Magellanic pygmy rice rat has a head-and-body length about equal to the length of its tail. The ears are moderately large, and are rounded with hairs on both surfaces. The dorsal pelage is greyish-buff and the underparts are whitish. The upper surface of both fore and hind feet is white. Tufts of white hairs extend beyond the tips of the claws. The tail is slender and naked.

== Ecology ==
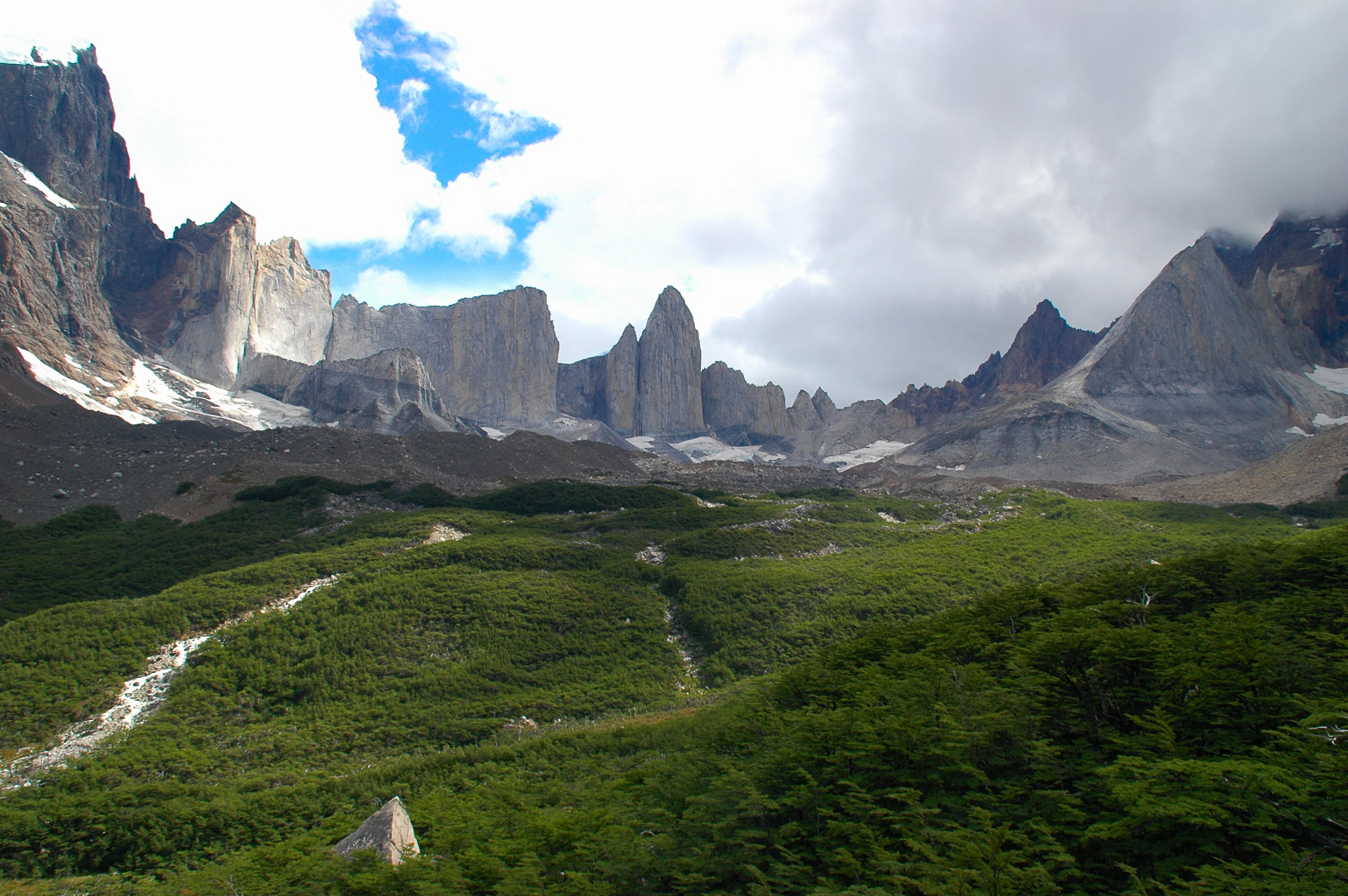
French Valley in the Torres del Paine National Park

Like other members of the genus, the Magellanic pygmy rice rat probably feeds on seeds, fruits and insects. Where it occurs in forests, it co-exists with the olive grass mouse (Abrothrix olivaceus) but not on the open pampas or in scrubland. One of the places where this pygmy rice rat can be found is the Torres del Paine National Park in the southern part of Chilean Patagonia.

== Status ==
O. magellanicus is common on Tierra del Fuego but is more localised further north. It faces no specific threats, has a wide range and occurs in a number of protected areas, so the International Union for Conservation of Nature has assessed its conservation status as being of "least concern".

== Literature cited ==
- Musser, G. G.; Carleton, M. D. (2005). "Superfamily Muroidea". In Wilson, D. E.; Reeder, D. M. (eds.). Mammal Species of the World: A Taxonomic and Geographic Reference (3rd ed.). Johns Hopkins University Press. pp. 894–1531. ISBN 978-0-8018-8221-0. OCLC 62265494.
