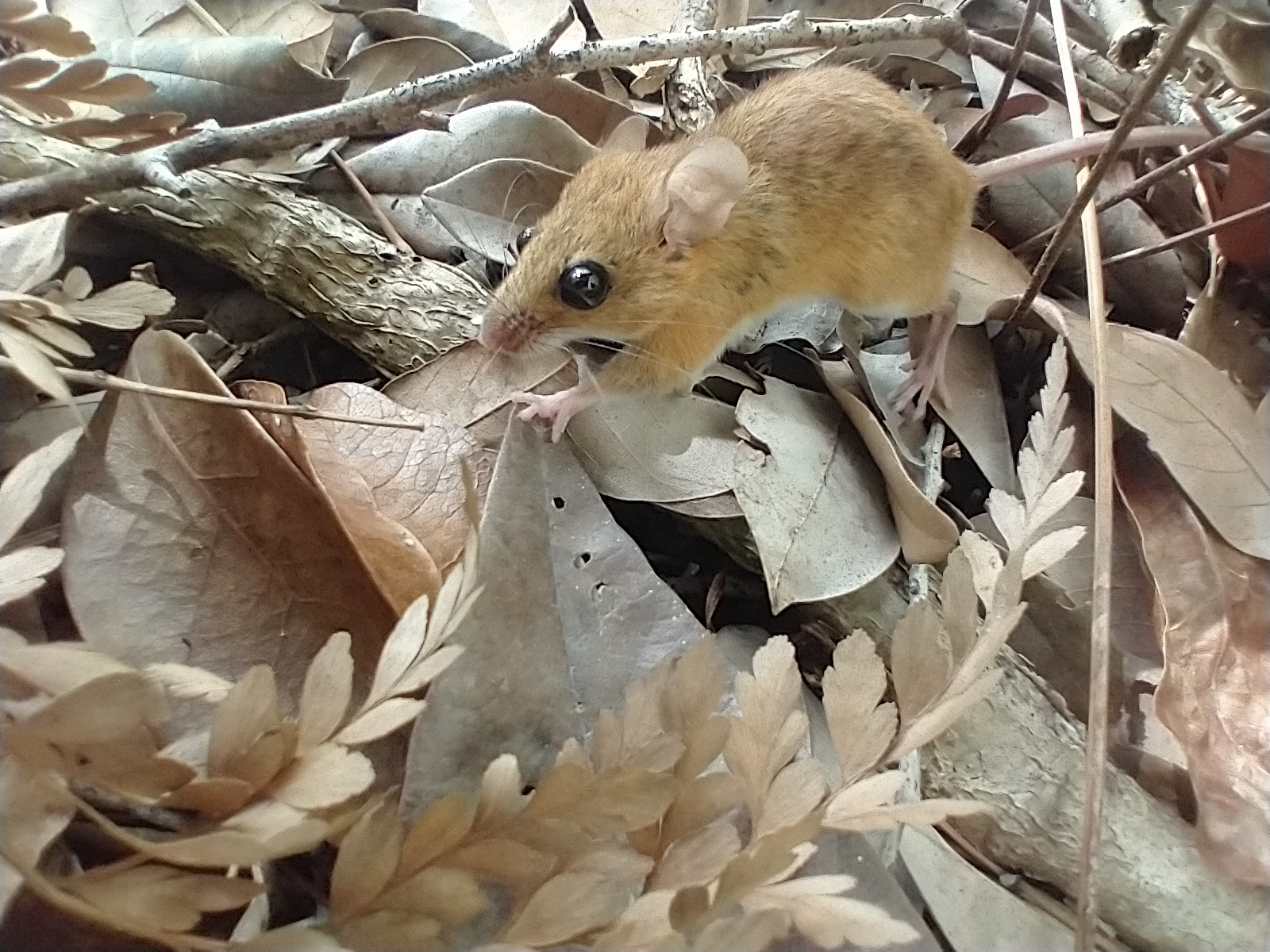

Conservation status
- Least Concern (IUCN 3.1)

Scientific classification
- Kingdom: Animalia
- Phylum: Chordata
- Class: Mammalia
- Order: Rodentia
- Family: Cricetidae
- Subfamily: Sigmodontinae
- Genus: Oligoryzomys
- Species: O. fulvescens

Binomial name
- Oligoryzomys fulvescens (Saussure, 1860)

Synonyms
- Oryzomys navus Bangs, 1899

= Oligoryzomys fulvescens =

Species of rodent

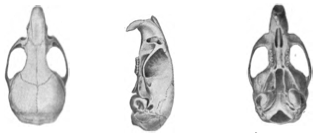
Holotype skull of Oryzomys navus, a junior synonym.

Oligoryzomys fulvescens, also known as the fulvous colilargo, fulvous pygmy rice rat, or northern pygmy rice rat, is a species of rodent in the genus Oligoryzomys of family Cricetidae. It is found from southern Mexico through Central America into South America, where it occurs south into Peru and Brazil, and includes numerous synonyms, including the type species of the genus, Oryzomys navus Bangs, 1899. The taxonomy of this species is unresolved, and it may be found to contain more than one species. Its karyotype has 2n = 54-60 and FNa = 68–74.

== Literature cited ==
- Musser, G. G.; Carleton, M. D. (2005). "Superfamily Muroidea". In Wilson, D. E.; Reeder, D. M. (eds.). Mammal Species of the World: A Taxonomic and Geographic Reference (3rd ed.). Johns Hopkins University Press. pp. 894–1531. ISBN 978-0-8018-8221-0. OCLC 62265494.
