= Humboldt big-eared brown bat =

Conservation status
- Data Deficient (IUCN 3.1)

Scientific classification
- Kingdom: Animalia
- Phylum: Chordata
- Class: Mammalia
- Order: Chiroptera
- Family: Vespertilionidae
- Genus: Histiotus
- Species: H. humboldti

Binomial name
- Histiotus humboldti Handley, 1996
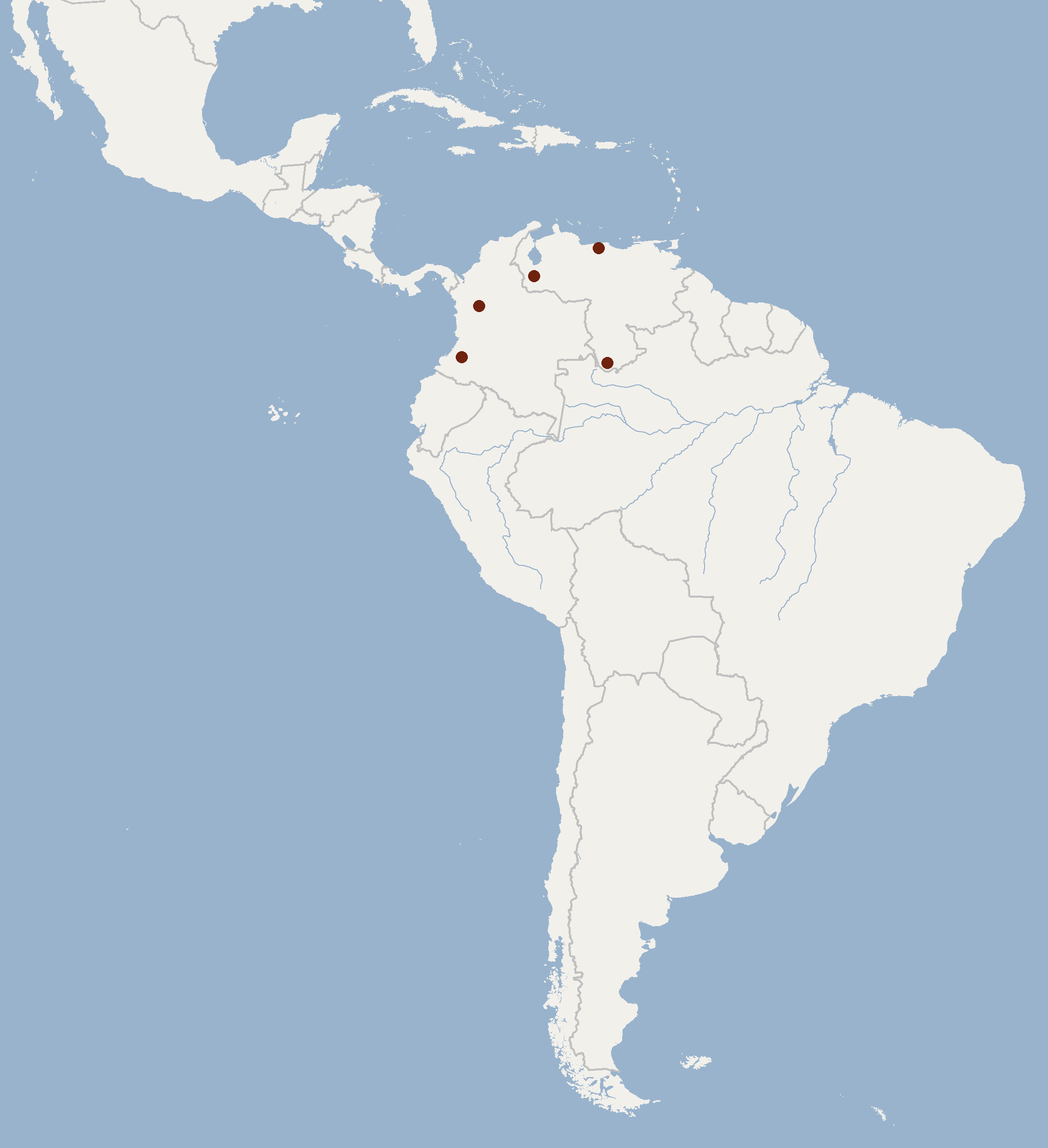

Species of bat

The Humboldt big-eared brown bat (Histiotus humboldti) is a species of vesper bat in the family Vespertilionidae. It is found in Colombia and Venezuela.

Histiotus humboldti is distributed in the subtropical forests of the eastern foothills of the mountains outside the Ecuadorian Andes, between 800 and 2,000 metres (2,600 and 6,600 ft) in the eastern subtropical zoogeographical floor, unlike Histiotus montanus which is recorded at higher altitudes of 1,800 and 4,000 metres (5,900 and 13,100 ft).
