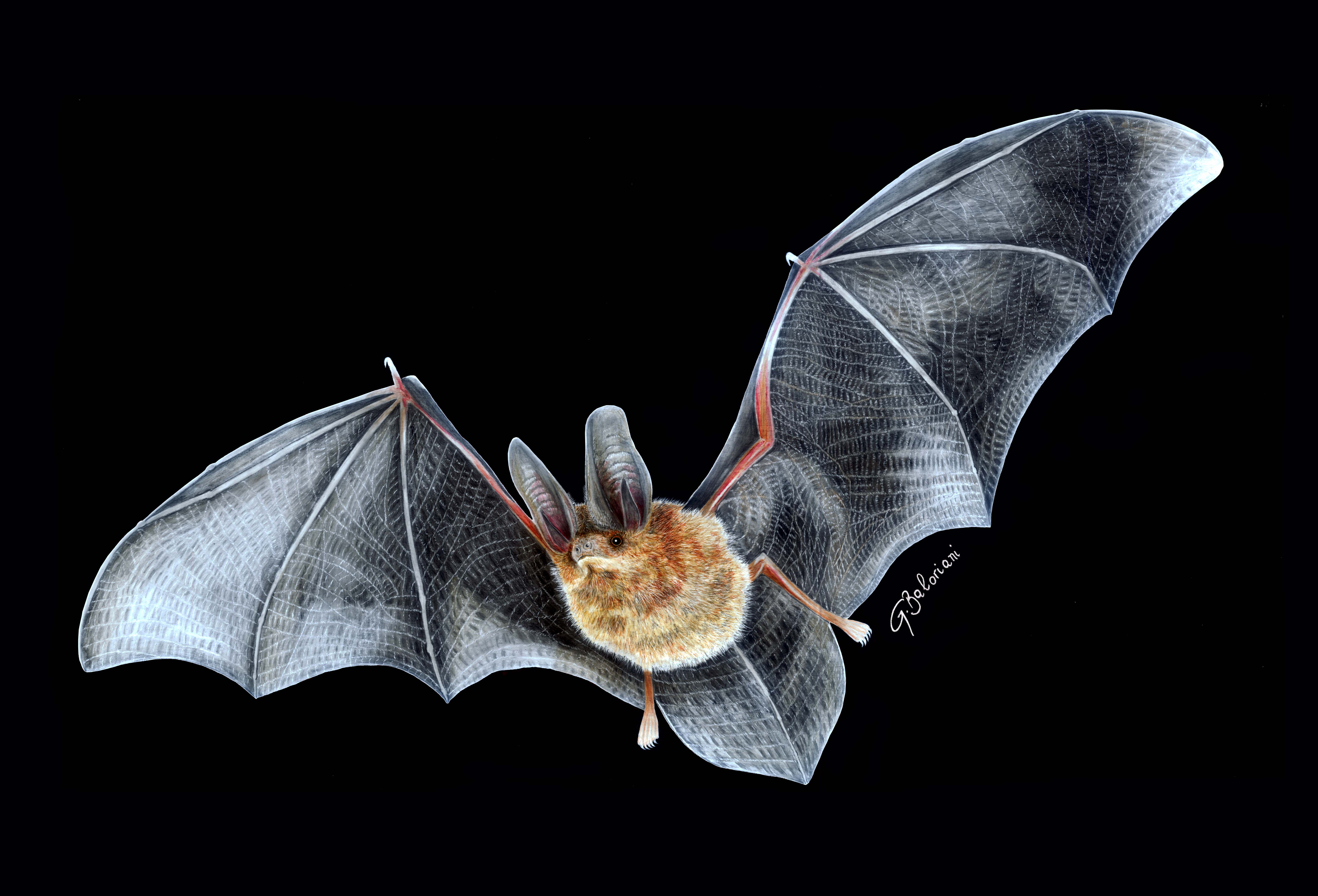
- Small big-eared brown bat (Histiotus montanus)

Scientific classification
- Domain: Eukaryota
- Kingdom: Animalia
- Phylum: Chordata
- Class: Mammalia
- Order: Chiroptera
- Family: Vespertilionidae
- Tribe: Eptesicini
- Genus: Histiotus; Gervais, 1856

Type species
- Plecotus velatus

Species
- Histiotus alienus Histiotus cadenai Histiotus colombiae Histiotus diaphanopterus Histiotus humboldti Histiotus laephotis Histiotus macrotus Histiotus magellanicus Histiotus mochica Histiotus montanus Histiotus velatus

= Histiotus =

Genus of bats

Histiotus (meaning "sail ears") is a genus of South American vesper bats with species that include:

- Strange big-eared brown bat, Histiotus alienus
- Cadena-García's big-eared brown bat, Histiotus cadenai
- Colombian big-eared brown bat, Histiotus colombiae
- Transparent-winged big-eared brown bat, Histiotus diaphanopterus
- Humboldt big-eared brown bat, Histiotus humboldti
- Thomas's big-eared brown bat, Histiotus laephotis
- Big-eared brown bat, Histiotus macrotus
- Southern big-eared brown bat, Histiotus magellanicus
- Moche big-eared brown bat, Histiotus mochica
- Small big-eared brown bat, Histiotus montanus
- Tropical big-eared brown bat, Histiotus velatus

In Paraguay, Histiotus bats have mainly been collected at human dwellings or around domestic animals, due to the significant increase in human activity in the Paraguayan Chaco over the last 20 years.

== Habitat ==
Histiotus is found in the tropical and temperate zones in South America. Their natural habitat ranges from areas with rocky mountains, to woods in Paraguay, Peru, Brazil, Argentina and Chile.

== Behavior ==
=== Echolocation and feeding ===
Histiotus are aerial feeders and use echolocation to catch prey. They can create echolocation calls dominated by frequencies below 20 kHz in order to catch prey. Histiotus diet consists of insects; H. montanus mainly eats butterflies and flies, H. macrotus eats flies, and H. velatus eat moths.

=== Social systems ===
Most of the species are colonial and some are considered individual. Individual systems are considered for bats that interact as one or less than ten bats. Females of most temperate zone bats form maternity colonies during summer to communally raise pups. These colonies allow individuals to reduce heat loss by forming a cluster. This is called social thermoregulation. (For more on metabolism go to: Metabolism).

== Flying adaptations ==
Flight performance is determined by wing shape and ecological aspects such as foraging behavior (the way they search for food) and habitat selection. Research showed that H. montanus and H. macrotus have high maneuverability and low speed, which corresponds to bats that inhabit wooded areas. The high maneuverability or ability to quickly alter flight direction and speed is important for bats to successfully capture prey and avoid predators.

== Respiratory and cardiovascular adaptations ==
Adaptation for flight involves many systems, and specifically cardiovascular and respiratory systems. Bats are considered as mammals adapted to extreme environments where oxygen management is crucial. Respiratory and cardiovascular systems undergo changes that allow the organism to optimize the acquisition and delivery of oxygen to tissues to be able to survive this extreme way of life. Research done on H.macrotus and H.montanus shows that they have the same respiratory strategy as other bats: "narrow-based high-keyed strategy." This strategy includes:

1. larger heart and cardiac output
2. high hematocrit, high hemoglobin concentration and high blood oxygen transport capacity and
3. optimization of respiratory structural parameters. In other words, these bats are able to make the most effective use of their respiratory structure.

== Metabolism ==
For bats, energy demands are particularly high during pregnancy or lactation. One way many bats are able to save energy is through the use of torpor, which is a controlled, substantial drop in metabolic rate and body temperature (metabolism). In addition to hibernation (prolonged torpor) during winter, temperate zone bats, such as Histiotus, often become torpid during periods of cold weather in summer (daily torpor) to save energy. By reducing metabolic rate, torpor prolongs gestation length and impairs lactation. This results in late births and slow juvenile growth rates. This reduces the probability for juveniles to survive their first winter, because not enough time has passed to store proper amounts of fat prior to hibernation. This is why females of most temperate zone bats, such as Histiotus, form maternity colonies during summer to communally raise pups. These colonies allow individuals to reduce heat loss by forming a cluster and therefore by their behavior they are able to improve insulation and this results in the conservation of energy.
