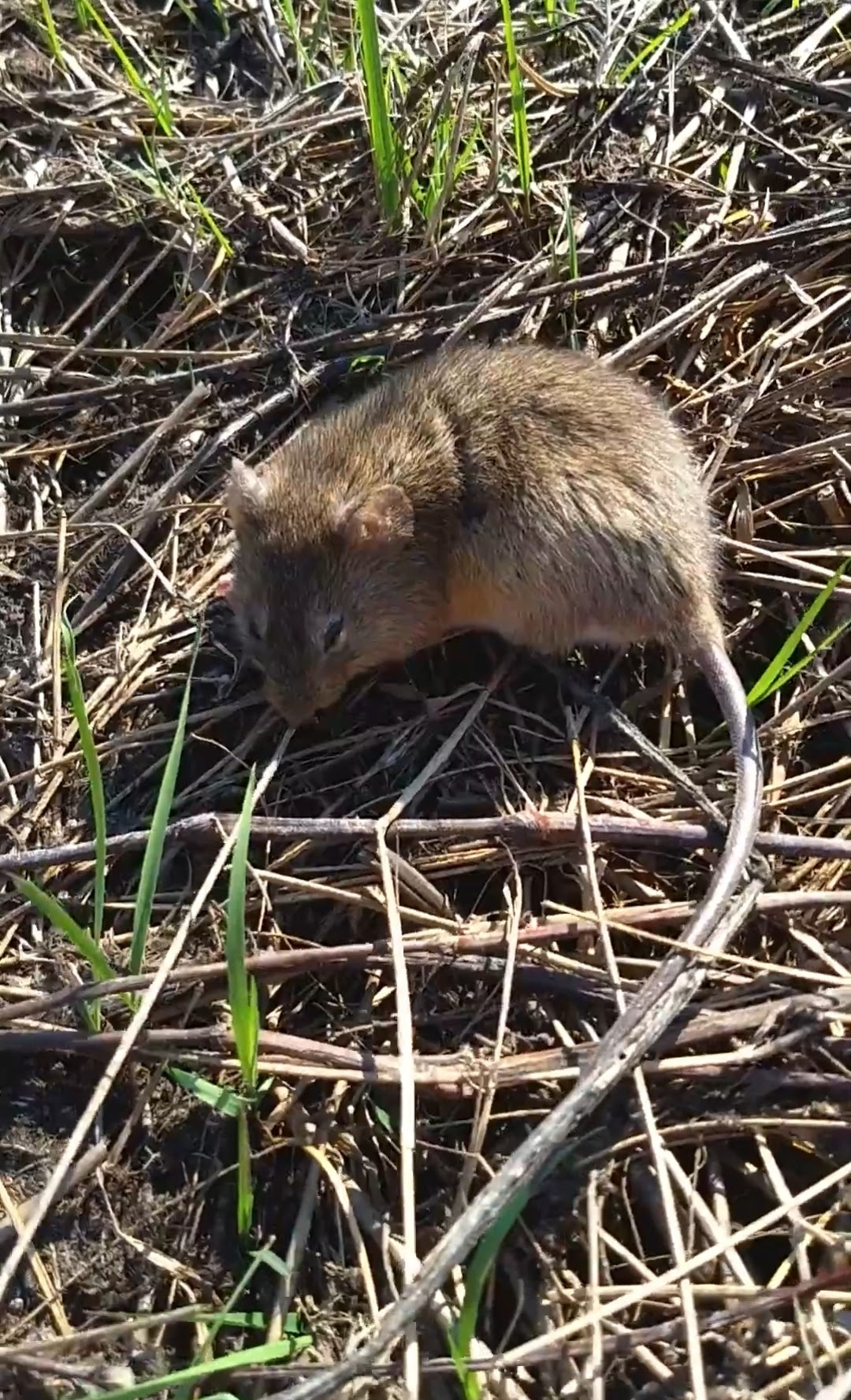

Conservation status
- Least Concern (IUCN 3.1)

Scientific classification
- Kingdom: Animalia
- Phylum: Chordata
- Class: Mammalia
- Order: Rodentia
- Family: Cricetidae
- Subfamily: Sigmodontinae
- Genus: Holochilus
- Species: H. chacarius

Binomial name
- Holochilus chacarius Thomas, 1906

= Holochilus chacarius =

Species of rodent

Holochilus chacarius, also known as the Chacoan marsh rat or Chaco marsh rat, is a semiaquatic species of rodent in the family Cricetidae. It is found in Argentina and Paraguay within the Gran Chaco.

== Description ==
This marsh rat is one of the smallest in the genus. The head-and-body length is between 140 and 201 mm (5.5 and 7.9 in) and the tail length is between 148 and 183 mm (5.8 and 7.2 in). The dorsal pelage is pale reddish-brown, with long black guard hairs, the flanks are buff or ochre, the throat and chest are white and the rest of the underparts are buff or grey, the hairs having white bases.

== Distribution and habitat ==
The Chaco marsh rat is native to Paraguay and the notheasten part of Argentina, being present in the provinces of Salta, Jujuy, Tucumán, Formosa, Chaco and Córdoba. It is a semi-aquatic species and is found in swamps and other areas of wetland, flooded pasture and cultivated fields, but seldom in forested habitats. In Paraguay it inhabits ground well covered in leaf litter and herbaceous plants.

== Ecology ==
The Chaco marsh rat can swim and dive, and can also climb well; it is a herbivore, feeding on a range of plant materials including sugarcane, rice, banana and other crops. It can make underground galleries with several entrances, but nests above ground, building circular structures of grass up to 30 cm (12 in) in diameter and often a metre or more above the ground. Litter sizes range from four to nine, and the young mature at sixty days.

== Status ==
The Chaco marsh rat is common in some areas and less so in others. The overall population is thought to be declining, but the rat has a wide range and is present in a number of protected areas, so the International Union for Conservation of Nature has assessed its conservation status as being of "least concern".
