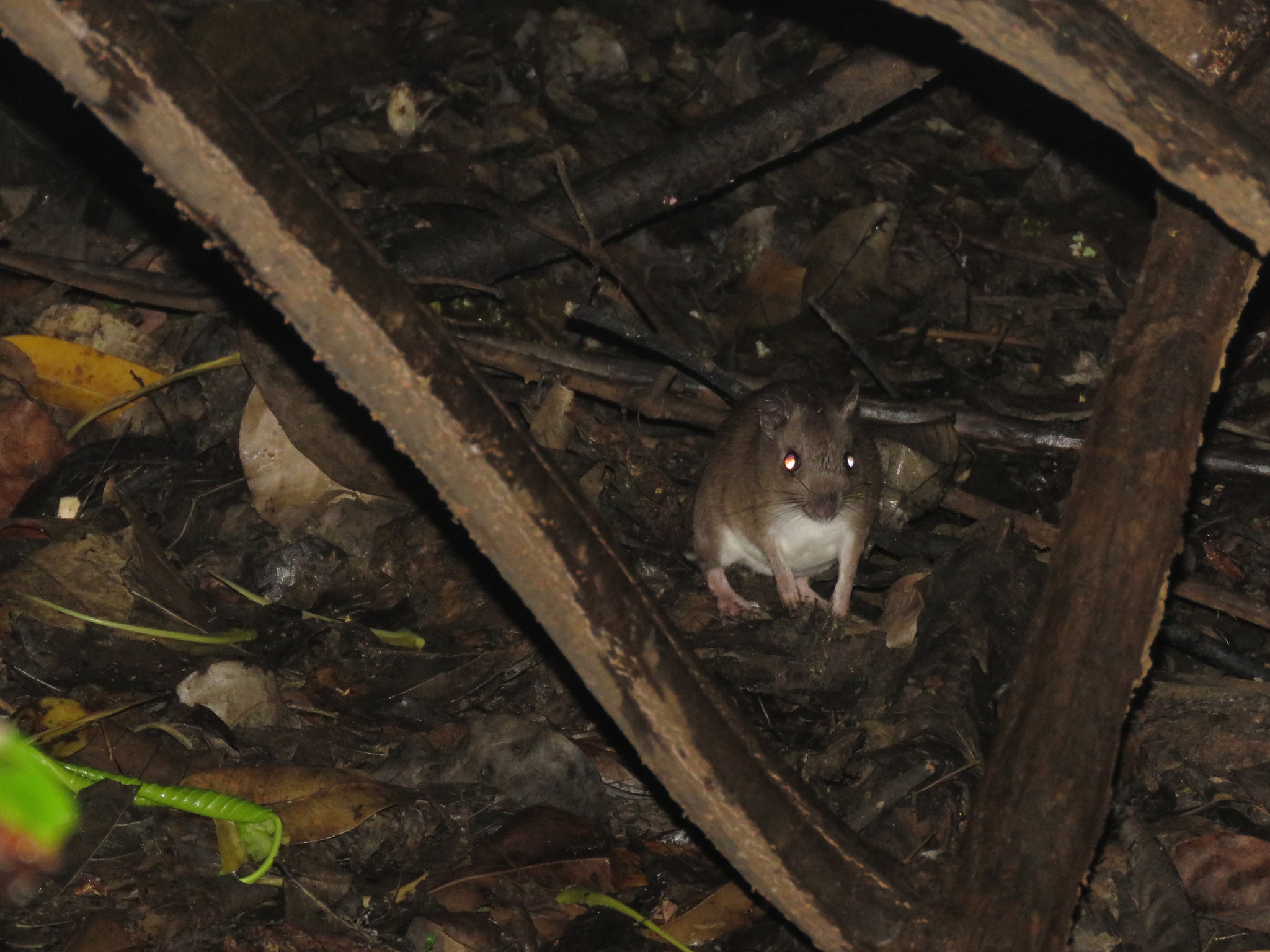
- Amazonian marsh rat (Holochilus sciureus) in Bolivia

Conservation status
- Least Concern (IUCN 3.1)

Scientific classification
- Kingdom: Animalia
- Phylum: Chordata
- Class: Mammalia
- Order: Rodentia
- Family: Cricetidae
- Subfamily: Sigmodontinae
- Genus: Holochilus
- Species: H. sciureus

Binomial name
- Holochilus sciureus Wagner, 1842

= Amazonian marsh rat =

Species of rodent

The Amazonian marsh rat (Holochilus sciureus), also known as the common marsh rat, or simply the marsh rat, is a rodent species from South America.

== Description ==
Amazonian marsh rats are smaller than the common brown rat, but otherwise have a similar appearance. They range from 13 to 22 cm (5.1 to 8.7 in) in head-body length, with a tail 12 to 18 cm (4.7 to 7.1 in) long, and typically weigh between 130 and 200 g (4.6 and 7.1 oz). They have short fur, which is tawny or buff over the back, becomes paler on the flanks, and fades to white or pale orange on the underparts. The hindfeet are noticeably larger than the forepaws, with prominent claws and partial webbing between the toes. There is also a slight fringe of longer, silvery, hair, around the soles of the feet. Females have eight or ten teats.

== Distribution and habitat ==
Amazonian marsh rats are found across much of northern South America east of the Andes. They inhabit open areas such as grasslands, savanna, marshes, clearings in the rainforest, and farmland, at elevations up to 2,000 metres (6,600 ft). Although the exact taxonomic status of some populations is unclear, two subspecies are currently recognised:

- Holochilus sciureus sciureus - Central Brazil, southern Colombia, eastern Peru and Ecuador, northern Bolivia
- Holochilus sciureus berbicensis - Venezuela, the Guianas, northern Brazil, eastern Colombia

== Biology and behaviour ==
Amazonian marsh rats feed primarily on grass stems, although they also eat some seeds, and small quantities of sedges, other plants, and even small invertebrates. They are nocturnal, occupying a home range of as little as 0.3 hectares (0.74 acres). Females construct spherical nests made of leaves in order to rear their young. These nests may be on the ground in dense vegetation or cracks in the earth, but are more commonly located 50 to 150 cm (20 to 59 in) above the ground, attached to sturdy stems such as those of sugar cane or rice plants. The inner lining of the nest consists of finely shredded leaves, with a more intact outer shell.

Predators include spectacled caiman, rattlesnakes, barn owls, savannah hawks, white-tailed kites, and probably crab-eating foxes.

They breed throughout the year, although the fertility of both sexes increases during periods of high rainfall. Courtship lasts around 4 days before mating occurs, and gestation lasts 29 days. The female gives birth at night or at dawn to a litter of up to eight blind, hairless, pups, each measuring around 5 cm (2.0 in) and weighing 7 g (0.25 oz). The fur begins to appear after five days, and the first teeth emerge at ten days. The young are weaned a fifteen days, by which time their eyes have opened. The rats reach sexual maturity at three to four months, with females maturing more slowly than males.
