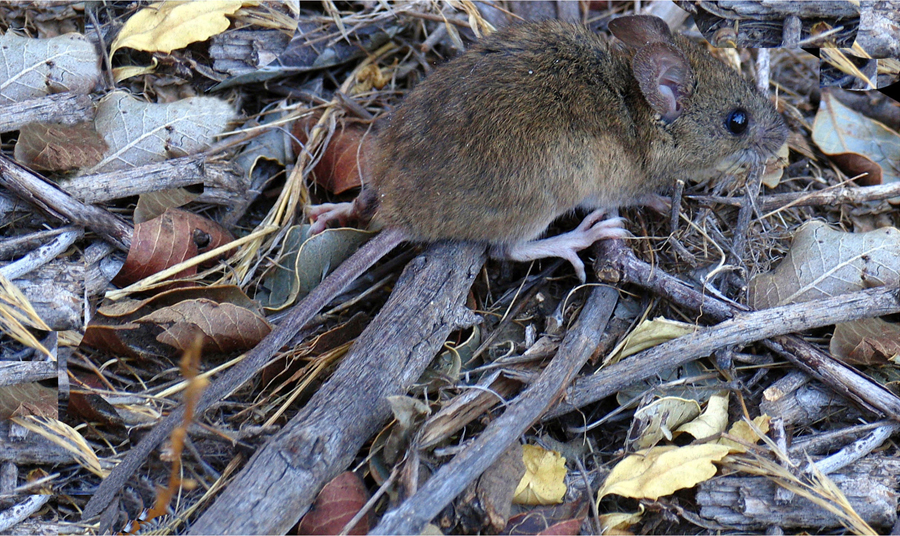
- O. longicaudatus

Scientific classification
- Kingdom: Animalia
- Phylum: Chordata
- Class: Mammalia
- Order: Rodentia
- Family: Cricetidae
- Subfamily: Sigmodontinae
- Tribe: Oryzomyini
- Genus: Oligoryzomys; Bangs, 1900

Type species
- Oryzomys navus

Species
- Oligoryzomys andinus; Oligoryzomys arenalis; Oligoryzomys brendae; Oligoryzomys chacoensis; Oligoryzomys destructor; Oligoryzomys flavescens; Oligoryzomys fornesi; Oligoryzomys fulvescens; Oligoryzomys griseolus; Oligoryzomys longicaudatus; Oligoryzomys magellanicus; Oligoryzomys microtis; Oligoryzomys moojeni; Oligoryzomys nigripes; Oligoryzomys rupestris; Oligoryzomys stramineus; Oligoryzomys vegetus; †Oligoryzomys victus

= Oligoryzomys =

Oligoryzomys Temporal range: Pleistocene to Recent

Genus of rodents

Oligoryzomys is a genus of rodents in the tribe Oryzomyini of family Cricetidae. Many species are known as pygmy rice rats or colilargos. The genus is found from Mexico to Tierra del Fuego and includes approximately 17 species.

In Argentina and Chile, Oligoryzomys longicaudatus and other members of the genus represent the reservoir for the hantavirus strain Andes virus (ANDV) (Wells et al., 1997; Levis et al., 1998; Cantoni et al., 2001).

== Taxonomy ==
The genus Oligoryzomys is included in the subfamily Sigmodontinae of the family Cricetidae. The genus is placed in the Oryzomyini tribe, first proposed by Oldfield Thomas in the early 20th century. It includes genera that have certain dental features of the upper and lower molars and a long palate which extends past the third molars. More recently, molecular analysis and morphological data has placed the genus in Clade C, alongside Neacomys, Microryzomys and Oreoryzomys.

== Characteristics ==
Characteristics that identify this group are broad rostrum; a tail that is longer than its head; and short, broad hind feet. Pygmy rice rats are very small rodents, with a head-and-body length of between 70 and 110 mm (2.8 and 4.3 in) and a tail length of between 85 and 155 mm (3.3 and 6.1 in). They are greyish-brown or reddish-brown animals that resemble members of the genus Oryzomys in appearance. They differ from Oryzomys in being mostly terrestrial rather than semi-aquatic and in having longer tails in proportion to their body size. The females have four pairs of mammary glands. The snout is pointed, the ears are rounded and the long slender tail is hairless.

== Ecology ==
Pygmy rice rats occupy a range of habitats including tropical forests, dry forests, plantations, scrubland, mountain grassland, agricultural land, gardens and houses. They are nocturnal and solitary and feed mainly on seeds, insects and fruits. They are mostly found on the ground but can climb into the undergrowth. They can be agricultural pests, particularly in rice fields.

Some species such as O. flavescens and O. longicaudatus are the principal reservoir host of certain hantaviruses which are harmless to rodents but can cause disease in humans.

== Literature cited ==
- IUCN. 2009. 2009 IUCN Red List of Threatened Species. IUCN. Version 2009.2. Retrieved on December 8, 2009.
- Musser, G.G. and Carleton, M.D. 2005. Superfamily Muroidea. Pp. 894–1531 in Wilson, D.E. and Reeder, D.M. (eds.). Mammal Species of the World: a taxonomic and geographic reference. 3rd ed. Baltimore: The Johns Hopkins University Press, 2 vols., 2142 pp. ISBN 978-0-8018-8221-0
- Weksler, M. 2006. Phylogenetic relationships of oryzomyine rodents (Muroidea: Sigmodontinae): separate and combined analyses of morphological and molecular data. Bulletin of the American Museum of Natural History 296:1–149.
