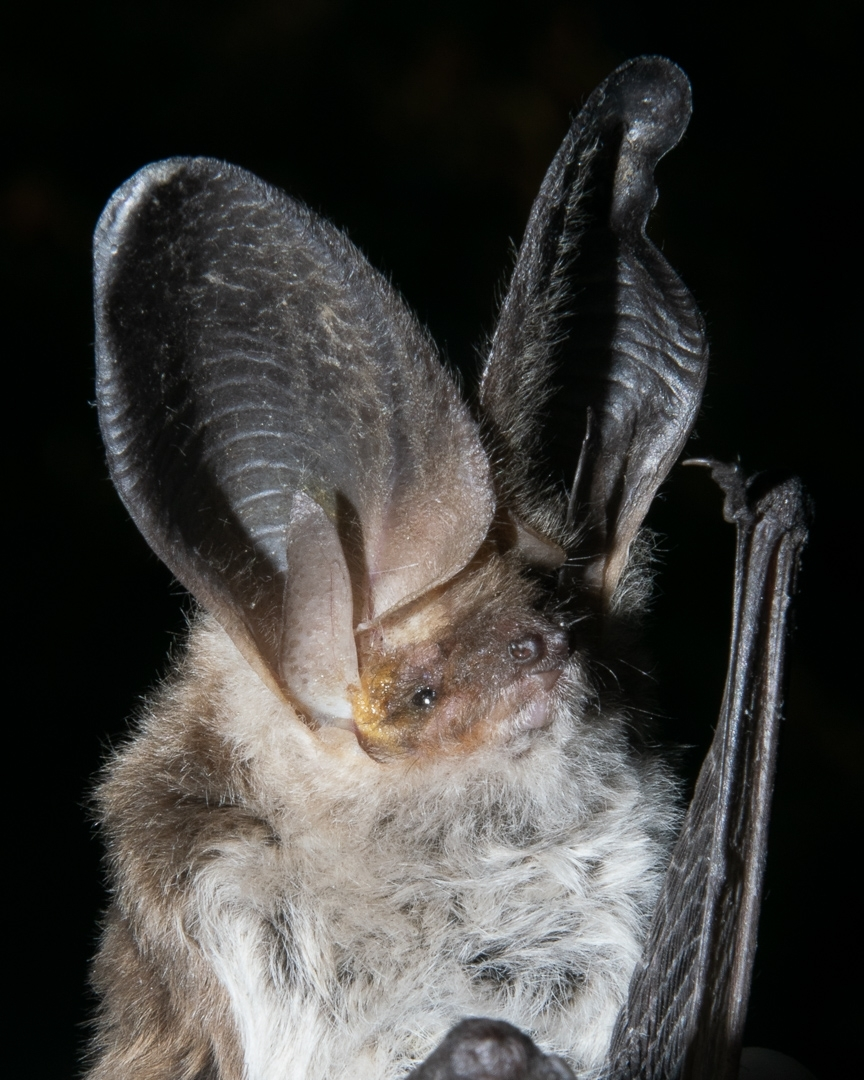

Conservation status
- Least Concern (IUCN 3.1)

Scientific classification
- Kingdom: Animalia
- Phylum: Chordata
- Class: Mammalia
- Order: Chiroptera
- Family: Vespertilionidae
- Genus: Histiotus
- Species: H. macrotus

Binomial name
- Histiotus macrotus (Poeppig, 1835)

Synonyms
- Nycticeius macrotus Poeppig, 1835

= Big-eared brown bat =

Species of bat

The big-eared brown bat (Histiotus macrotus) is a species of vesper bat found in Argentina, Paraguay, and Chile.

== Taxonomy ==
It was described as a new species in 1835 by German zoologist Eduard Friedrich Poeppig. Poeppig placed it in the genus Nycticeius, with a binomial of N. macrotus. By 1875, it was published under its current name combination, Histiotus macrotus.

== Description ==
It has large ears that exceed 33 mm (1.3 in) in length. The fur on its back is dark brown, while its belly fur is whitish. The flight membranes and ears are the darkest parts of its body.

== Range and habitat ==
It is found in South America, where its range includes Argentina, Chile, and Paraguay. One study published that the species was found in Peru, though the image of the specimen did not appear to show the big-eared brown bat. It has been documented at a range of elevations from 240–3,600 m (790–11,810 ft) above sea level.

== Conservation ==
As of 2016, it is evaluated as a least-concern species by the IUCN.
