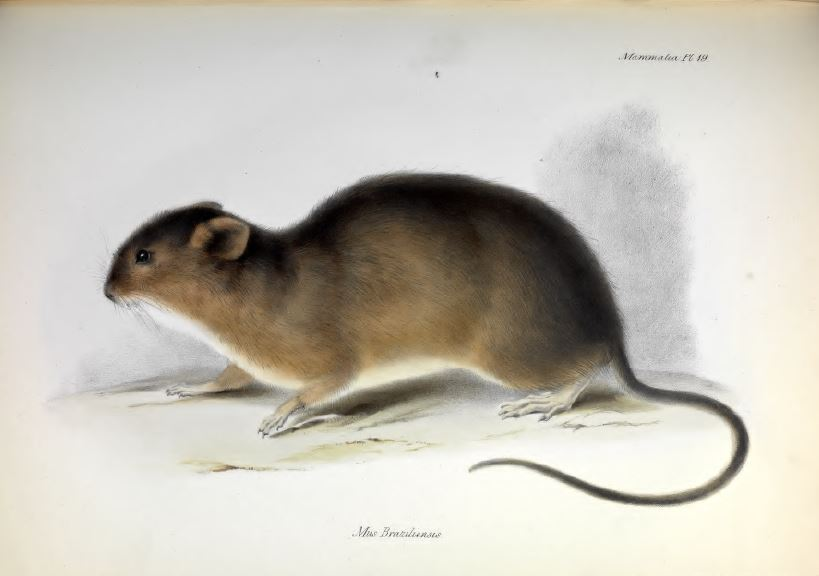

Conservation status
- Least Concern (IUCN 3.1)

Scientific classification
- Kingdom: Animalia
- Phylum: Chordata
- Class: Mammalia
- Infraclass: Placentalia
- Order: Rodentia
- Family: Cricetidae
- Subfamily: Sigmodontinae
- Genus: Holochilus
- Species: H. brasiliensis

Binomial name
- Holochilus brasiliensis (Desmarest, 1819)
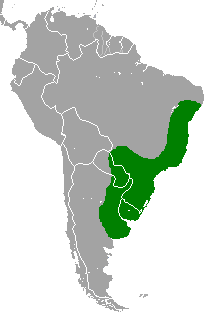
- Holochilus brasiliensis range map

= Holochilus brasiliensis =

Species of rodent

Holochilus brasiliensis, also known as the Brazilian marsh rat or web-footed marsh rat, is a species of semiaquatic rodent from South America. It is found in northeastern Argentina, southern and eastern Brazil and in eastern Uruguay.

== Description ==
This is a medium sized species compared with other members of the genus; the head-and-body length is between 167 and 211 mm (6.6 and 8.3 in) and the tail length is between 183 and 214 mm (7.2 and 8.4 in). The fur is luxuriant and dense. The dorsal colour is cinnamon, the flanks are a brighter orange and the underparts a paler orange, apart from a white throat and chest and some white in the unguinal area.

== Distribution and habitat ==
H. brasiliensis is semiaquatic and occurs in eastern and southern Brazil, Uruguay, eastern Paraguay and northeastern Argentina in the Atlantic Forest Ecoregion. It is typically found in swampy grassland and woodland areas bordering rivers in the rainforest, both on the coastal plain and inland.

== Ecology ==
A nocturnal species, H. brasiliensis moves freely on land and in the water. It is seldom caught in live traps but is frequently caught by barn owls and mammalian carnivores. It feeds on tender shoots and mostly breeds after rains in spring and summer, with litters of three to six young having been recorded. It can be a pest in sugar cane and rice crops.

== Status ==
The International Union for Conservation of Nature has assessed this species as being of "least concern". This is because it has a wide range, is able to adapt to modified habitats, is present in a number of reserves and other protected areas, and the population is large and seems stable.
