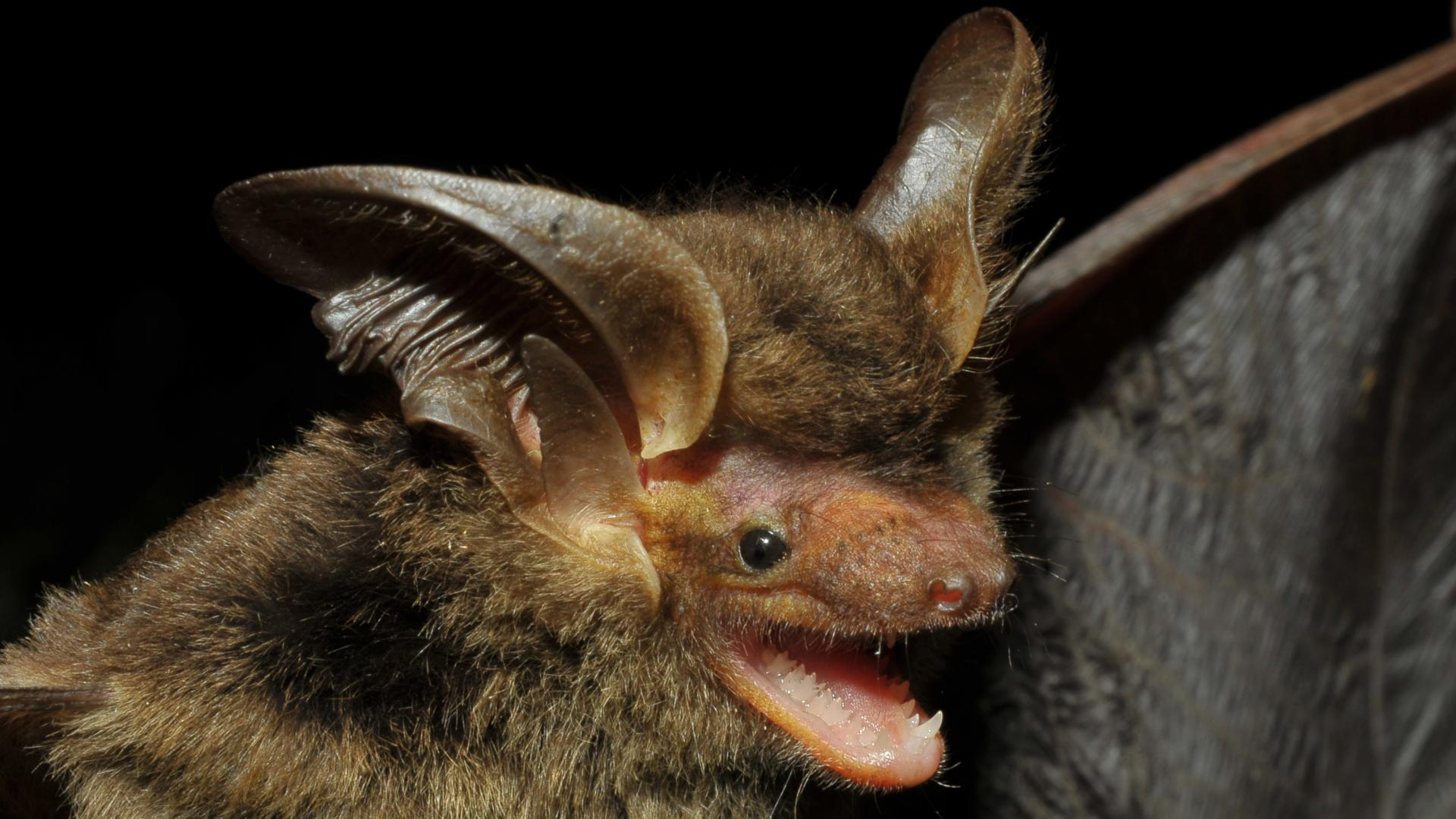

Conservation status
- Data Deficient (IUCN 3.1)

Scientific classification
- Kingdom: Animalia
- Phylum: Chordata
- Class: Mammalia
- Order: Chiroptera
- Family: Vespertilionidae
- Genus: Histiotus
- Species: H. alienus

Binomial name
- Histiotus alienus Thomas, 1916
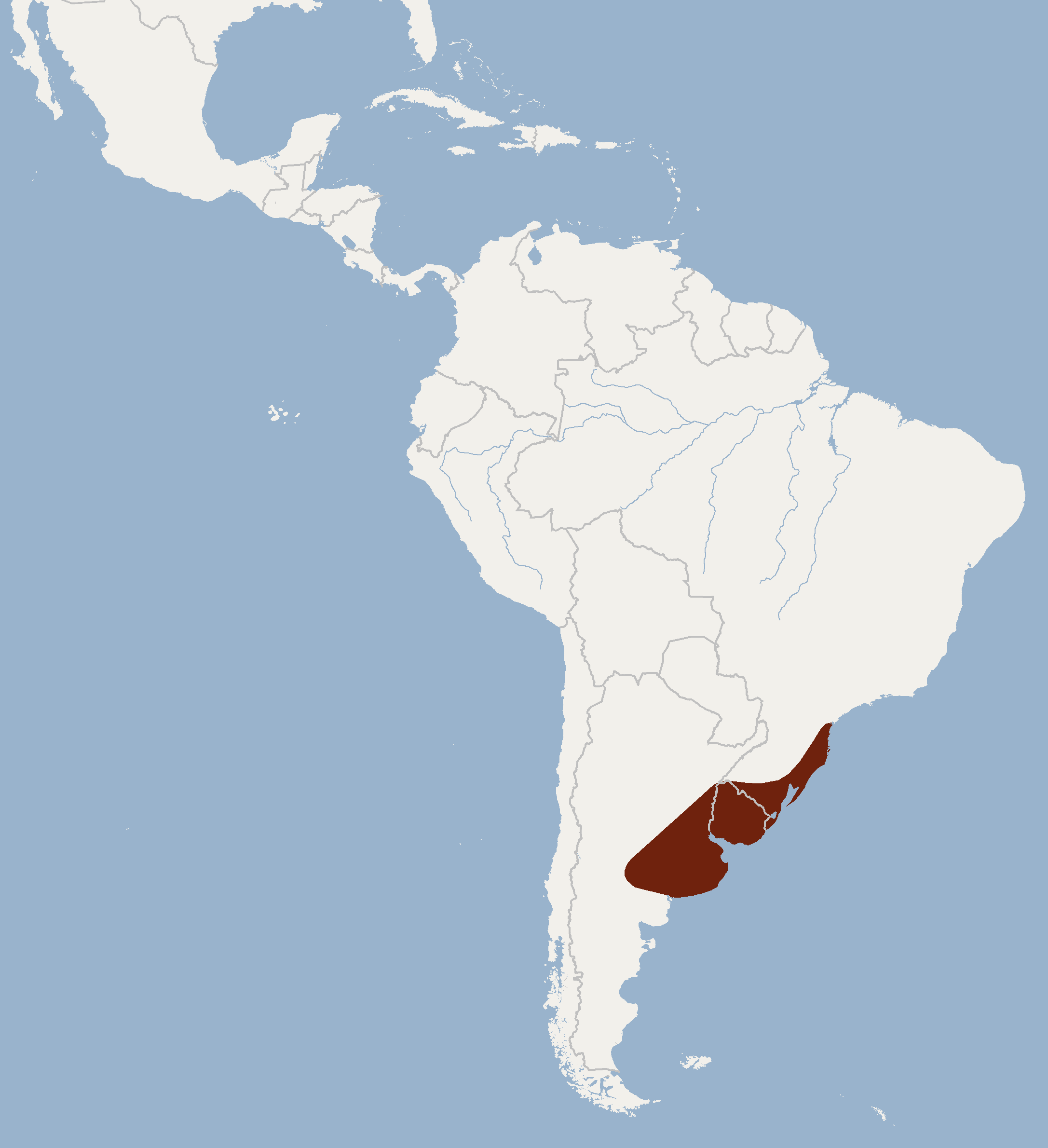

= Strange big-eared brown bat =

Species of bat

The strange big-eared brown bat (Histiotus alienus), is a bat species found in Brazil.

Originally described from a bat collected in 1916, a second specimen was obtained in 2018.
