= Oligoryzomys nigripes =

Conservation status
- Least Concern (IUCN 3.1)

Scientific classification
- Kingdom: Animalia
- Phylum: Chordata
- Class: Mammalia
- Order: Rodentia
- Family: Cricetidae
- Subfamily: Sigmodontinae
- Genus: Oligoryzomys
- Species: O. nigripes

Binomial name
- Oligoryzomys nigripes (Olfers, 1818)

Synonyms
- Mus nigripes Olfers, 1818; Oryzomys delticola Thomas, 1917; Hesperomys eliurus Wagner, 1845; Hesperomys pygmaeus Wagner, 1845; Mus tarso nigro Fischer, 1814; Oryzomys (Oligoryzomys) utiaritensis J.A. Allen, 1916

Species of rodent

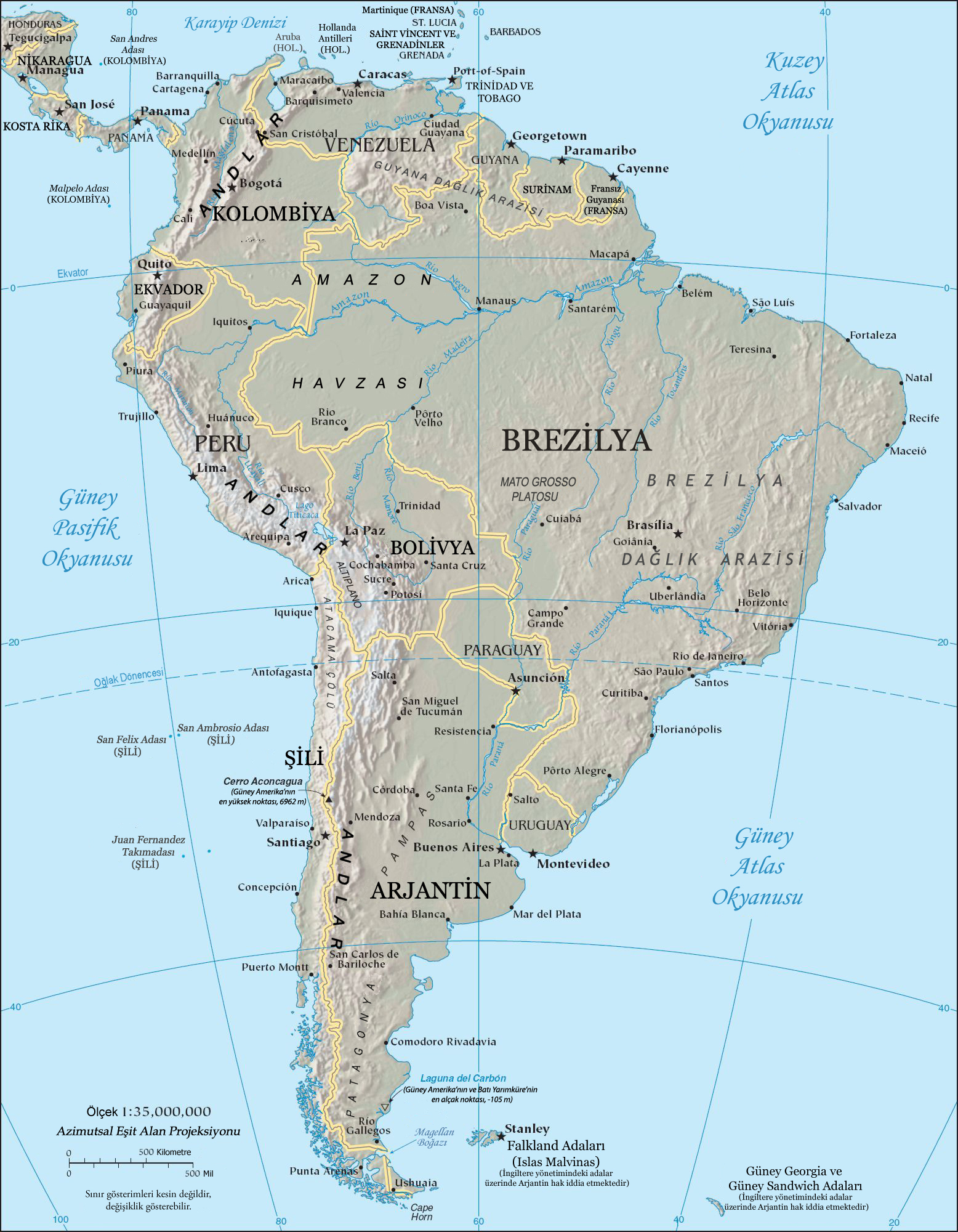
Oligoryzomys nigripes is found in South America.

Oligoryzomys nigripes, also known as the black-footed colilargo or the black-footed pygmy rice rat, is a rodent in the genus Oligoryzomys of family Cricetidae. Oligoryzomys nigripes is a species that has been further divided into different sister taxa throughout history. It is found in different countries in South America. It is a large species with long ears, dark yellow to dark brown upperparts, sharply delimited from the whitish underparts, and often a pink girdle on the chest. This species of rat spends much of its life among the trees. The karyotype is 2n = 62, FNa = 78–82.

== Synonym species ==
Two other species, Oligoryzomys delticola (also known as the delta pygmy rice rat or the large colilargo) and Oligoryzomys eliurus (also known as the Brazilian pygmy rice rat or the Brazilian colilargo) have been recognized as synonyms of O. nigripes since 2005; they cannot be distinguished on the basis of morphology, karyotype, or morphometrics.

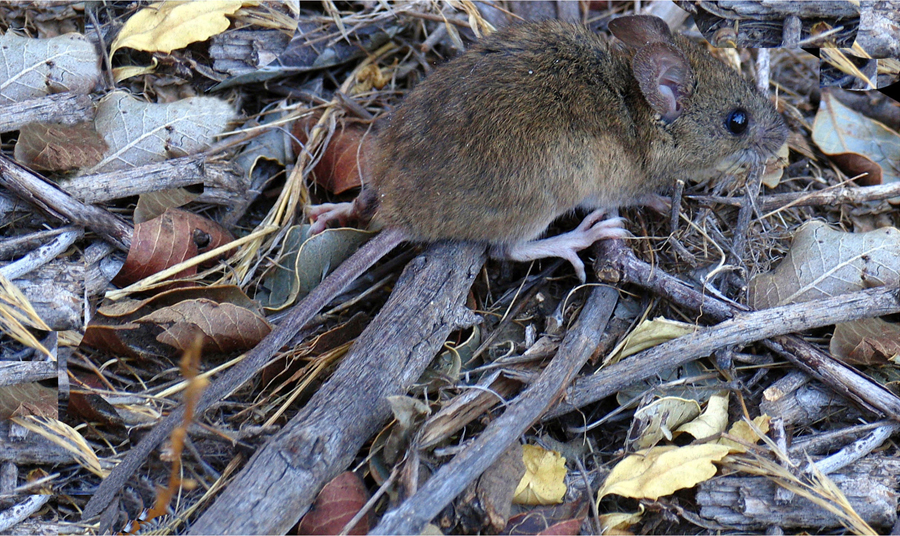
This is Oligoryzomys longicaudatus, a sister species of Oligoryzomys nigripes that resembles it.

== Location ==
Oligoryzomys nigripes is found from Pernambuco in northeastern Brazil through the Atlantic Forest and Cerrado into Paraguay, Uruguay, and Argentina, where it occurs in the provinces of Chaco, Misiones, and Buenos Aires.

== Morphology ==
The pelage colors for this species resemble brown, dark yellow, and grey. This species of Oligoryzomys have small bodies and long tails. The totaled head plus body length of the model species for O. nigripes is 9 cm. The tail length for the model species for O. nigripes is 10.5 cm. The weight of the animal ranges from 26.32 grams to 33.3 grams. The eyes of this species are rounded and jet black.

== Behavior ==
Oligoryzomys nigripes is a nocturnal species of rodent. They live entirely on land and many of them dwell in the trees. They are proficient at climbing these trees. This species is a known insectivore, but can be frugivorous. Therefore, O. nigripes is considered an omnivore. They scavenge for nutrient sources in things such as fruits, insects, and seeds.

== Karyotype ==
There are 31 pairs of chromosomes found in the Oligoryzomys nigripes species. The diploid formula for this species is 2n=62. There are 60 autosomal chromosomes and 2 sex chromosomes found in this species.
