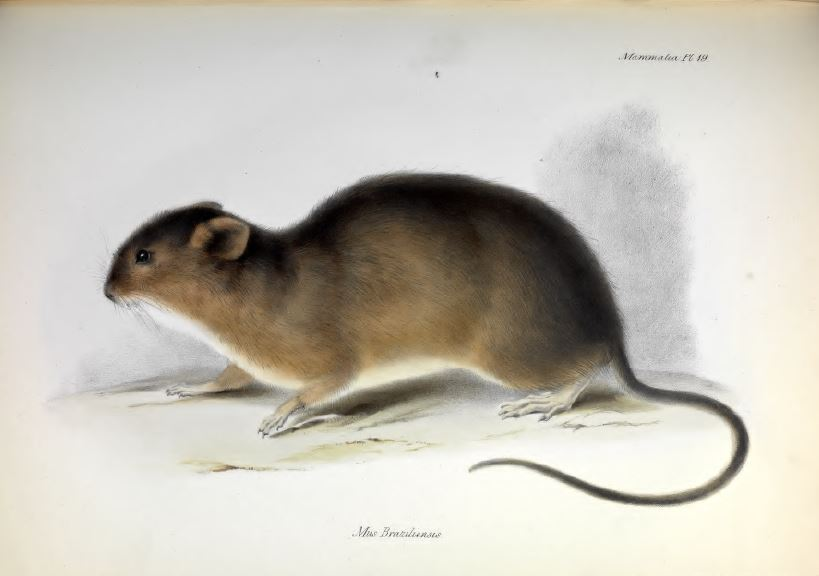
- Holochilus brasiliensis

Scientific classification
- Domain: Eukaryota
- Kingdom: Animalia
- Phylum: Chordata
- Class: Mammalia
- Order: Rodentia
- Family: Cricetidae
- Subfamily: Sigmodontinae
- Tribe: Oryzomyini
- Genus: Holochilus; Brandt, 1835

Type species
- Holochilus sciureus

Species
- Holochilus brasiliensis Holochilus chacarius Holochilus nanus Holochilus oxe Holochilus sciureus

= Holochilus =

Holochilus Temporal range: Middle Pleistocene to Recent

Genus of rodents

Holochilus is a genus of semiaquatic rodents in the tribe Oryzomyini of family Cricetidae, sometimes called marsh rats. It contains five living species, H. brasiliensis, H. chacarius, H. nanus, H. oxe, and H. sciureus, which are widely distributed in South America east of the Andes. A fourth species from the Pleistocene of Bolivia was formerly classified as H. primigenus, but is now placed in the genus Reigomys.
