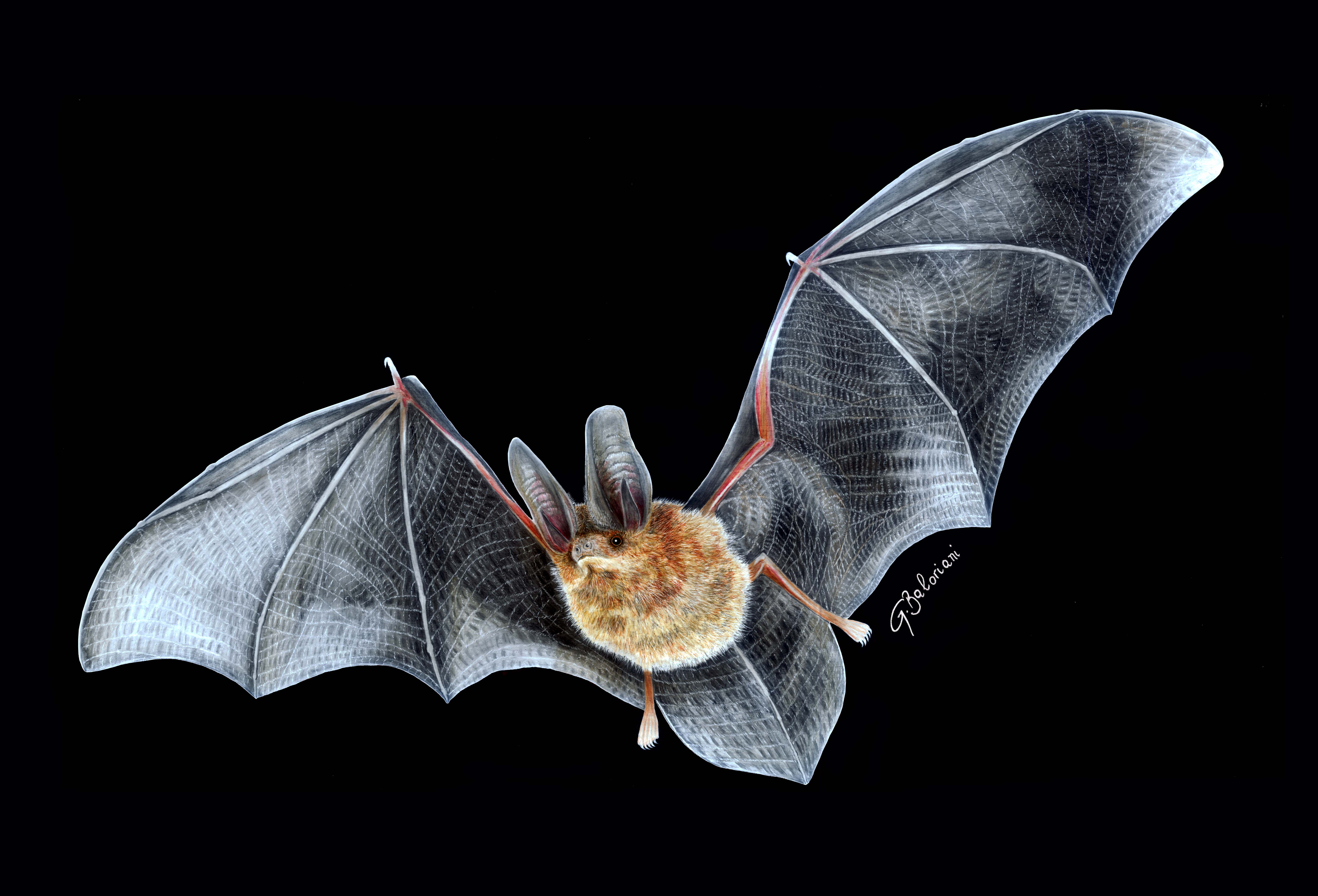

Conservation status
- Least Concern (IUCN 3.1)

Scientific classification
- Kingdom: Animalia
- Phylum: Chordata
- Class: Mammalia
- Order: Chiroptera
- Family: Vespertilionidae
- Genus: Histiotus
- Species: H. montanus

Binomial name
- Histiotus montanus Philippi & Landbeck, 1861

= Small big-eared brown bat =

Species of bat

The small big-eared brown bat (Histiotus montanus) is a species of vesper bat in the family Vespertilionidae. It can be found in Argentina, Bolivia, Brazil, Chile, Colombia, Ecuador, Peru, Uruguay, and Venezuela.
