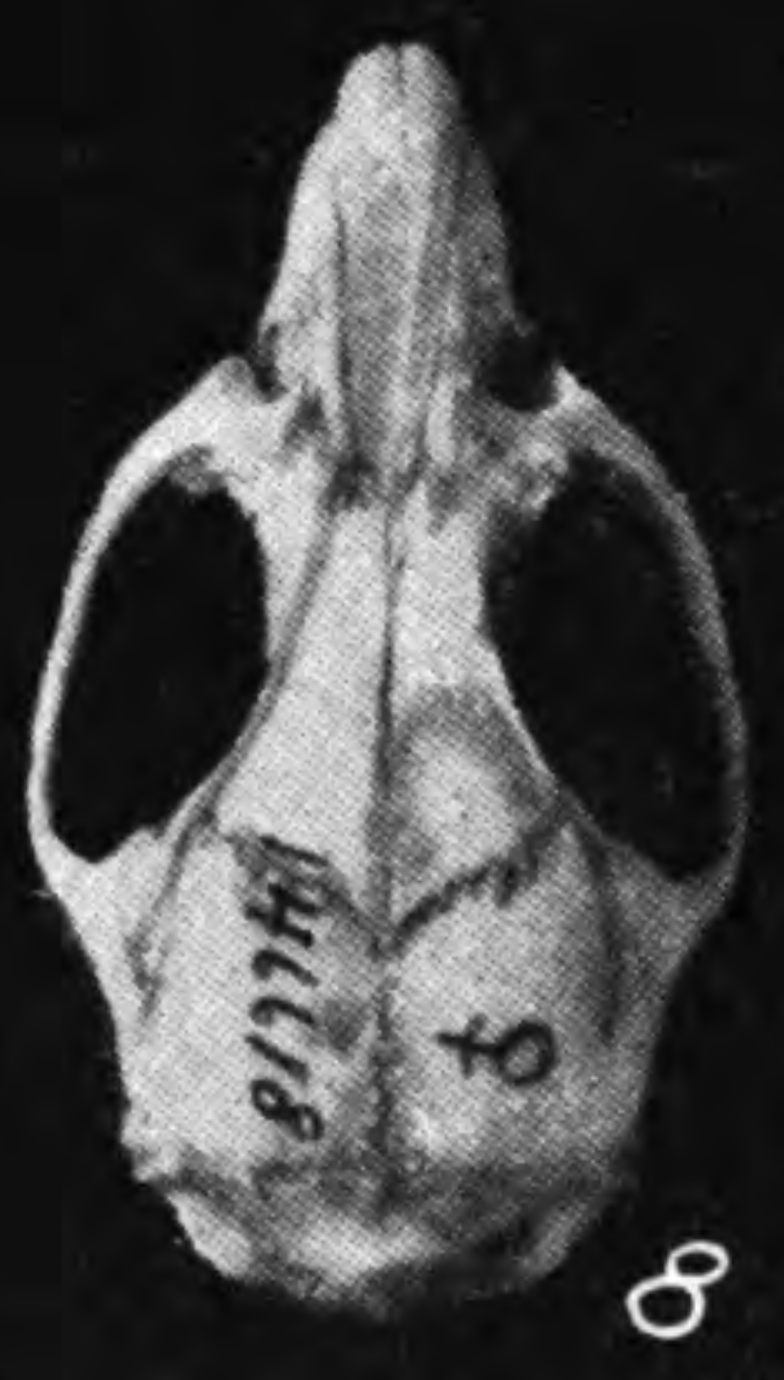
- Skull of Oryzomys peninsulae, seen from above

Conservation status
- Critically endangered, possibly extinct (IUCN 3.1)

Scientific classification
- Kingdom: Animalia
- Phylum: Chordata
- Class: Mammalia
- Order: Rodentia
- Family: Cricetidae
- Subfamily: Sigmodontinae
- Genus: Oryzomys
- Species: O. peninsulae

Binomial name
- Oryzomys peninsulae Thomas, 1897
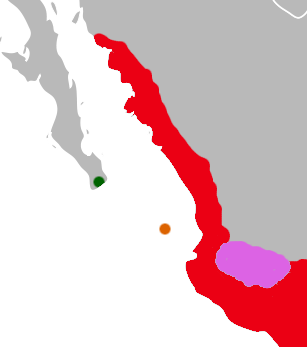
- Distribution of O. peninsulae (in dark green) and other western Mexican Oryzomys

Synonyms
- Oryzomys peninsulæ Thomas, 1897 (Note: The International Code of Zoological Nomenclature mandates that specific names first published with a ligature such as æ are to be corrected (International Commission on Zoological Nomenclature, 1999, Art. 32.5.2).); Oryzomys palustris peninsulae: Hershkovitz, 1970; Oryzomys couesi peninsularis: Alvarez-Castañeda, 1994 (Note: Incorrect subsequent spelling (Alvarez-Castañeda, 1994, p. 99; Carleton and Arroyo-Cabrales, 2009, p. 122).); Oryzomys couesi peninsulae: Alvarez-Castañeda and Cortés-Calva, 1999

= Oryzomys peninsulae =

Species of rodent from western Mexico

Oryzomys peninsulae, also known as the Lower California rice rat, is a species of rodent from western Mexico. Restricted to the southern tip of the Baja California peninsula, it is a member of the genus Oryzomys of family Cricetidae. Only about 20 individuals, collected around 1900, are known, and subsequent destruction of its riverine habitat may have driven the species to extinction.

Medium in size for its genus, it was first described as a separate species, but later lumped into other, widespread species until it was reinstated as separate in 2009. It is distinctive in fur color—grayish brown on the forequarters and reddish brown on the hindquarters—and in some dimensions of its skull, with a high braincase, robust zygomatic arches (cheekbones), and long incisive foramina (perforations of the palate between the incisors and the molars).

== Taxonomy ==
Oryzomys peninsulae was first collected in 1896 and Oldfield Thomas described it in 1897 as a full species of Oryzomys. It was retained as a distinct species related to O. couesi and O. palustris until 1971, when Philip Hershkovitz swept it, and other outlying populations of the same species group, as subspecies under an expanded concept of O. palustris. Raymond Hall concurred in the second edition (1981) of Mammals of North America, arguing that O. peninsulae differed less from mainland Oryzomys populations (currently classified as O. couesi mexicanus) than some other forms he included in O. palustris differed from each other. After studies of the contact zone between North American O. palustris and Central American O. couesi in southern Texas and northeastern Tamaulipas (by Benson and Gehlbach in 1979 and Schmidt and Engstrom in 1994) made clear that the two are distinct from each other, O. peninsulae remained as a subspecies of O. couesi. In 2009, Michael Carleton and Joaquín Arroyo-Cabrales reviewed the classification of western Mexican Oryzomys and used morphological and morphometrical data to characterize four distinct Oryzomys species in the region. O. peninsulae and another isolated population, O. nelsoni from the Islas Marías, were both retained as separate species, as was O. albiventer from montane mainland Mexico. They kept the population in the coastal lowlands as a subspecies, O. couesi mexicanus, of O. couesi.

The genus Oryzomys currently includes about eight species distributed from the eastern United States (O. palustris) into northwestern South America (O. gorgasi). O. peninsulae is part of the O. couesi section, which is centered on the widespread Central American O. couesi and also includes various other species with more limited and peripheral distributions. Many aspects of the systematics of this section remain unclear and it is likely that the current classification underestimates the group's true diversity. Oryzomys was previously a much larger genus, but most species were progressively removed in various studies, culminating in contributions by Marcelo Weksler and coworkers in 2006 that excluded more than forty species from the genus. Oryzomys and many of the species removed from it are classified in the tribe Oryzomyini ("rice rats"), a diverse assemblage of American rodents of over a hundred species, and on higher taxonomic levels in the subfamily Sigmodontinae of family Cricetidae, along with hundreds of other species of mainly small rodents.

== Description ==
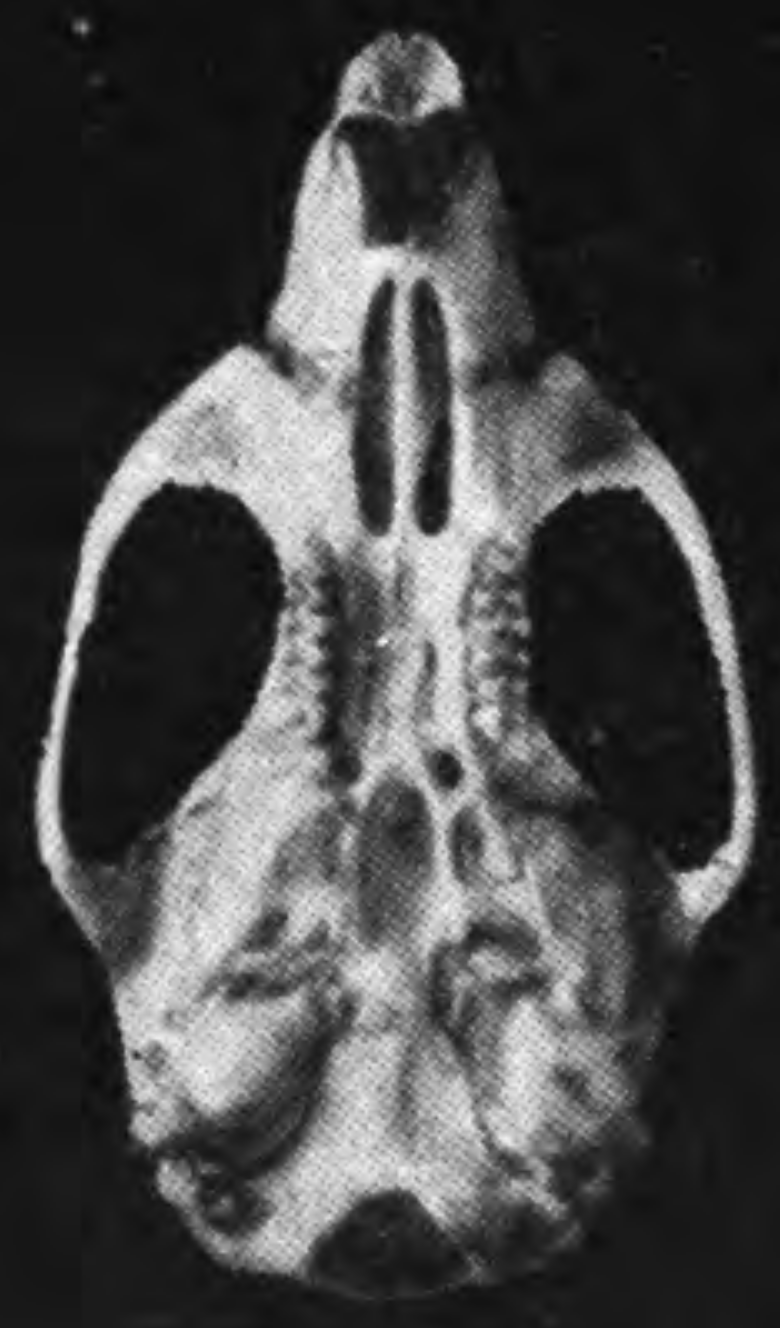
Skull of O. peninsulae, seen from below

Oryzomys peninsulae is a medium-sized member of the genus, smaller than O. albiventer but larger than O. couesi mexicanus. Its fur is grayish-brown on the forequarters, but reddish-brown on the hindquarters; this coloration pattern is unique among western Mexican Oryzomys. The underparts are a dirty white, the feet white above, and the tail dark or brownish above and dirty white below.

In the skull, the braincase is high, the zygomatic arches (cheekbones) are broad and squared, and the incisive foramina, which perforate the palate between the incisors and the molars, are long and broad. The upper incisors are orthodont, with their cutting edge nearly vertical. Morphometrically, the skull of O. peninsulae is sharply distinct from other western Mexican Oryzomys.

In 14 specimens measured by Carleton and Arroyo-Cabrales, total length was 227 to 305 mm (8.9 to 12.0 in), averaging 265.6 mm (10.46 in); head and body length was 113 to 152 mm (4.4 to 6.0 in), averaging 128.9 mm (5.07 in); tail length was 114 to 156 mm (4.5 to 6.1 in), averaging 136.8 mm (5.39 in); hindfoot length was 29 to 34 mm (1.1 to 1.3 in), averaging 32.0 mm (1.26 in); and occipitonasal length (a measure of total skull length) was 27.8 to 34.3 mm (1.09 to 1.35 in), averaging 31.5 mm (1.24 in).

== Distribution, ecology, and status ==
Twenty-one specimens of O. peninsulae are known: six were caught at Santa Anita in 1896 by D. Coolidge, and Edward William Nelson and Edward Alphonso Goldman obtained fifteen additional individuals in 1906 at San José del Cabo. The two localities, which are about 13 km (8.1 mi) apart, were both located along the Río San José, a river in southernmost Baja California Sur, near the southern tip of the Baja California peninsula. Like other Oryzomys species, O. peninsulae is semiaquatic, spending much of its time in the water, but suitable habitat for such a species is estimated to be no more than 13 km^{2} (5.0 sq mi) on the arid Baja California peninsula.

Río San José no longer exists, having fallen prey to irrigation projects, and touristic development of its estuary has resulted in pollution. Biologists working in the area in 1979 and from 1991 to 1993 failed to find O. peninsulae, casting doubt on its continued existence. The lack of records for over a century, small distribution, and destruction of the only known habitat led Carleton and Arroyo-Cabrales to consider the conservation status of O. peninsulae as "critically endangered, if not extinct". They noted that the status of the species had previously been obscured because it had been lumped for decades with O. couesi, a widely distributed and secure species.

== Origin ==
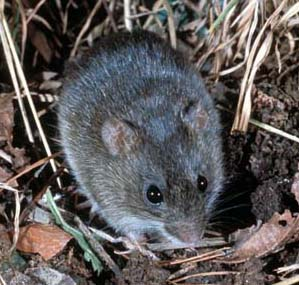
The marsh rice rat (O. palustris), a relative of O. peninsulae from the eastern United States

It is uncertain how O. peninsulae arrived at its recent locale in Baja California Sur. In 1922, Nelson suggested that it may have been introduced from another part of Mexico in a shipment of farm products, but this hypothesis is disproved by the clear differentiation from other western Mexican Oryzomys that the species exhibits.

The species's range may be relictual in nature: while Oryzomys is currently found along the eastern coast of the Gulf of California only as far north as coastal southern Sonora, the past distribution of the genus may have extended further northward, perhaps even into the southwestern United States, and from there south into Baja California. Subsequent disappearance of Oryzomys from the northern regions would have led to its observed disjunct distribution, with O. peninsulae isolated on the peninsula. This possibility is supported by the relatively close resemblance between O. peninsulae and O. couesi mexicanus, from coastal western Mexico.

Alternatively, the ancestor of O. peninsulae may have arrived by rafting during the late Miocene, about six million years ago, when the southern tip of the Baja California peninsula was an island located near what is now Nayarit and Jalisco in western Mexico. Some plants and birds from the area may have a similar biogeographic heritage.

== Literature cited ==
- Alvarez-Castañeda, S. T. (1994). "Current status of the rice rat, Oryzomys couesi peninsularis". The Southwestern Naturalist. 39 (1): 99–100. Bibcode:1994SWNat..39...99A. doi:10.2307/3672202. JSTOR 3672202.
- Benson, D. L.; Gehlbach, F. R. (1979). "Ecological and taxonomic notes on the rice rat (Oryzomys couesi) in Texas". Journal of Mammalogy. 60 (1): 225–228. doi:10.2307/1379783. JSTOR 1379783.
- Carleton, M. D.; Arroyo-Cabrales, J. (2009). "Review of the Oryzomys couesi complex (Rodentia: Cricetidae: Sigmodontinae) in Western Mexico" (PDF). Bulletin of the American Museum of Natural History. 331: 94–127. doi:10.1206/582-3.1. S2CID 42256389.
- Goldman, E. A. (1918). "The rice rats of North America". North American Fauna. 43: 1–101. doi:10.3996/nafa.43.0001 (inactive 11 September 2025).
- Hall, E. R. (1981). Mammals of North America. Vol. 2. Caldwell, New Jersey: The Blackburn Press. pp. 601–1181, 1–90 (index). ISBN 1-930665-31-8.
- International Commission on Zoological Nomenclature (1999). International Code of Zoological Nomenclature (4th ed.). London: The International Trust for Zoological Nomenclature. doi:10.5962/bhl.title.50608. ISBN 0-85301-006-4. Archived from the original on 2009-05-24.
- Merriam, C. H. (1901). "Synopsis of the rice rats (genus Oryzomys) of the United States and Mexico". Proceedings of the Washington Academy of Sciences. 3: 273–295.
- Musser, G. G.; Carleton, M. D. (2005). "Superfamily Muroidea". In Wilson, D. E.; Reeder, D. M. (eds.). Mammal Species of the World: A Taxonomic and Geographic Reference (3rd ed.). Baltimore: The Johns Hopkins University Press. pp. 894–1531. ISBN 978-0-8018-8221-0.
- Schmidt, C. A.; Engstrom, M. D. (1994). "Genic variation and systematics of rice rats (Oryzomys palustris species group) in southern Texas and northeastern Tamaulipas, Mexico". Journal of Mammalogy. 75 (4): 914–928. doi:10.2307/1382473. JSTOR 1382473.
- Thomas, O. (1897). "Descriptions of new bats and rodents from America". Annals and Magazine of Natural History. 20 (120): 544–553. doi:10.1080/00222939709487398.
- Weksler, M. (2006). "Phylogenetic relationships of oryzomine rodents (Muroidea: Sigmodontinae): Separate and combined analyses of morphological and molecular data". Bulletin of the American Museum of Natural History. 296: 1–149. doi:10.1206/0003-0090(2006)296[0001:proorm]2.0.co;2. hdl:2246/5777.
- Weksler, M.; Percequillo, A. R.; Voss, R. S. (2006). "Ten new genera of oryzomyine rodents (Cricetidae: Sigmodontinae)". American Museum Novitates (3537): 1–29. doi:10.1206/0003-0082(2006)3537[1:tngoor]2.0.co;2. hdl:2246/5815.
