= Oryzomys nelsoni =

- Skull of Oryzomys nelsoni, seen from above.

Conservation status
- Extinct (IUCN 3.1)

Scientific classification
- Kingdom: Animalia
- Phylum: Chordata
- Class: Mammalia
- Order: Rodentia
- Family: Cricetidae
- Subfamily: Sigmodontinae
- Genus: Oryzomys
- Species: †O. nelsoni

Binomial name
- †Oryzomys nelsoni Merriam, 1898
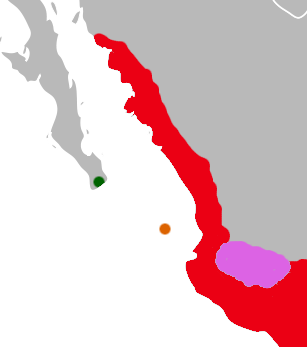
- Distribution of O. nelsoni (orange) and other western Mexican Oryzomys.

Synonyms
- Oryzomys nelsoni Merriam, 1898; Oryzomys palustris nelsoni: Hershkovitz, 1971

Extinct species of rodent

Oryzomys nelsoni, also known as the Nelson’s rice rat, is an extinct rodent of María Madre Island, Nayarit, Mexico. Within the genus Oryzomys of the family Cricetidae, it may have been most closely related to the mainland species O. albiventer. Since its first description in 1898, most authors have regarded it as a distinct species, but it has also been classified as a mere subspecies of the marsh rice rat (O. palustris).

After its discovery in 1897, it has never been recorded again and it is now considered extinct; the presence of introduced black rats on María Madre may have contributed to its extinction. O. nelsoni was a large species, distinguished in particular by its long tail, robust skull, and large incisors. It was reddish to yellowish above and mostly white below. Its diet may have included plant material and small animals.

== Taxonomy ==
O. nelsoni was collected by Edward William Nelson and Edward Goldman in May 1897 and never found again. Their visit for the Biological Survey of the United States Department of Agriculture was one of the first scientific exploration of the islands. Clinton Hart Merriam identified the mammals they obtained, including four specimens of O. nelsoni, which were deposited in the United States National Museum and remain there. He named it as a species of the genus Oryzomys, O. nelsoni; the specific name honors Nelson. Investigators have generally retained it as a species distinct from other Oryzomys, but in 1971 Hershkovitz listed it as one of many subspecies of O. palustris, which he envisaged as a wide-ranging species encompassing what is now the marsh rice rat (O. palustris) of the southern and eastern United States, O. couesi of Central America, and several other species with more limited distributions.

In his 1918 revision of North American Oryzomys, Goldman considered O. nelsoni to be most closely related to the nearest mainland subspecies of O. couesi, O. c. mexicanus. In 2009, Michael Carleton and Joaquin Arroyo-Cabrales revised the Oryzomys of western Mexico and confirmed that O. nelsoni is a very distinct species. Their morphometrical analysis found some resemblance between the species and O. albiventer of interior mainland Mexico, and they suggested that although O. nelsoni likely represents an old, distinctive lineage, it may have derived from a common ancestor with O. albiventer.

O. nelsoni is one of about eight species in the genus Oryzomys, which occurs from the eastern United States (O. palustris) into northwestern South America (O. gorgasi). O. nelsoni is further part of the O. couesi section, which is centered on the widespread Central American O. couesi and also includes various other species with more limited and peripheral distributions. Many aspects of the systematics of the O. couesi section remain unclear and it is likely that the current classification underestimates the true diversity of the group. Oryzomys previously included many other species, which were progressively removed in various studies culminating in a contribution by Marcelo Weksler and coworkers in 2006 that removed more than 40 species from the genus. All are classified in the tribe Oryzomyini ("rice rats"), a diverse assemblage of American rodents of over 100 species, and on higher taxonomic levels in the subfamily Sigmodontinae of family Cricetidae, along with hundreds of other species of mainly small rodents.

Common names proposed for this species include Nelson rice rat, Nelson's rice rat, Nelson's oryzomys, and Tres Marias Island rice rat.

== Description ==
Skull of O. nelsoni, seen from below

O. nelsoni was a large and long-tailed Oryzomys; its tail was longer than that of any other western Mexican Oryzomys. The upperparts were ochraceous to buff, most richly so on the rump, and paler further to the front and low on the flanks. On the head and the back, blackish hairs somewhat darkened the overall color. The underparts were white, with lead-colored underfur that was visible in some places. The ears were covered on both sides with scanty grayish hairs. The large hindfeet were sparsely covered with pale hairs. The tail was largely dark, but the underside of the basal one third to one half was light yellow.

O. nelsoni was distinctive in its large skull with broad, well-developed incisors and a strong front part (rostrum) that is strongly curved downwards. In O. albiventer, the rostrum and incisors were not as massive, but the molars are larger. The interparietal bone, part of the roof of the braincase, was broad and the incisive foramina, which perforated the palate between the incisors and the molars, were relatively short.

Total length in the four known specimens is 282 to 344 mm (11.1 to 13.5 in), averaging 322 mm (12.7 in); head and body length is 122 to 153 mm (4.8 to 6.0 in), averaging 140.5 mm (5.53 in); tail length is 160 to 191 mm (6.3 to 7.5 in), averaging 181.5 mm (7.15 in); and hindfoot length is 35 to 39 mm (1.4 to 1.5 in), averaging 37.3 mm (1.47 in).

== Ecology and extinction ==
Nelson and Goldman found the species only in a damp, herbaceous site now known as the "Sacatal" near a spring high on María Madre Island, the largest of the Islas Marías off the coast of Nayarit, western Mexico, and Nelson wrote that it was rare. He gave the elevation of this place as 1800 ft, which Álvarez-Castañeda and Méndez converted to 550 m, but in his 1918 paper, Goldman gave 800 ft instead, which Carleton and Arroyo-Cabrales in 2009 converted to 245 m. The next survey of small mammals on the island took place in March 1976 by a team led by Don E. Wilson. They failed to collect O. nelsoni and instead found only the introduced black rat (Rattus rattus) at the locality where Nelson and Goldman had collected O. nelsoni; this species may have contributed to the decline of the indigenous rodent.

The species is now considered extinct, although as late as 2002 the Mexican government listed it as "threatened". Another Islas Marías endemic, the deermouse Peromyscus madrensis, still occurred on María Madre in 1976. O. nelsoni is thought to have fed on plant material such as weeds, fruit, and seeds, and more rarely on animals such as fish and invertebrates.

== Literature cited ==
- Álvarez-Castañeda, S.T. and Méndez, L. 2003. Oryzomys nelsoni. Mammalian Species 735:1–2.
- Carleton, M.D. and Arroyo-Cabrales, J. 2009. Review of the Oryzomys couesi complex (Rodentia: Cricetidae: Sigmodontinae) in western Mexico. Bulletin of the American Museum of Natural History 331:94–127.
- Goldman, E.A. 1918. The rice rats of North America. North American Fauna 43:1–100.
- Merriam, C.H. 1898. Mammals from the Tres Marias Islands, off western Mexico. Proceedings of the Biological Society of Washington 12:13–19.
- Musser, G.G. and Carleton, M.D. 2005. Superfamily Muroidea. Pp. 894–1531 in Wilson, D.E. and Reeder, D.M. (eds.). Mammal Species of the World: a taxonomic and geographic reference. 3rd ed. Baltimore: The Johns Hopkins University Press, 2 vols., 2142 pp. ISBN 978-0-8018-8221-0
- Nelson, E.W. 1899a. General description of the Tres Marias Islands, Mexico. North American Fauna 14:7–14.
- Nelson, E.W. 1899b. Mammals of the Tres Marias Islands. North American Fauna 14:15–20.
- Weksler, M. 2006. Phylogenetic relationships of oryzomyine rodents (Muroidea: Sigmodontinae): separate and combined analyses of morphological and molecular data. Bulletin of the American Museum of Natural History 296:1–149.
- Weksler, M., Percequillo, A.R. and Voss, R.S. 2006. Ten new genera of oryzomyine rodents (Cricetidae: Sigmodontinae). American Museum Novitates 3537:1–29.
- Wilson, D.E. 1991. Mammals of the Tres Marías Islands. Bulletin of the American Museum of Natural History 206:214–250.
