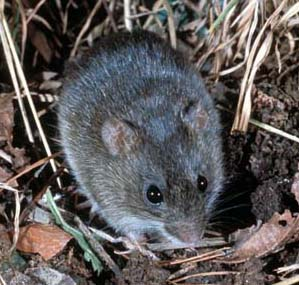
- Marsh rice rat (Oryzomys palustris)

Scientific classification
- Kingdom: Animalia
- Phylum: Chordata
- Class: Mammalia
- Order: Rodentia
- Family: Cricetidae
- Subfamily: Sigmodontinae
- Tribe: Oryzomyini
- Genus: Oryzomys; Baird, 1857

Type species
- Mus palustris Harlan, 1837

Species
- Oryzomys albiventer; Oryzomys couesi; Oryzomys dimidiatus; Oryzomys gorgasi; Oryzomys palustris; Oryzomys peninsulae; †Oryzomys antillarum; †Oryzomys nelsoni
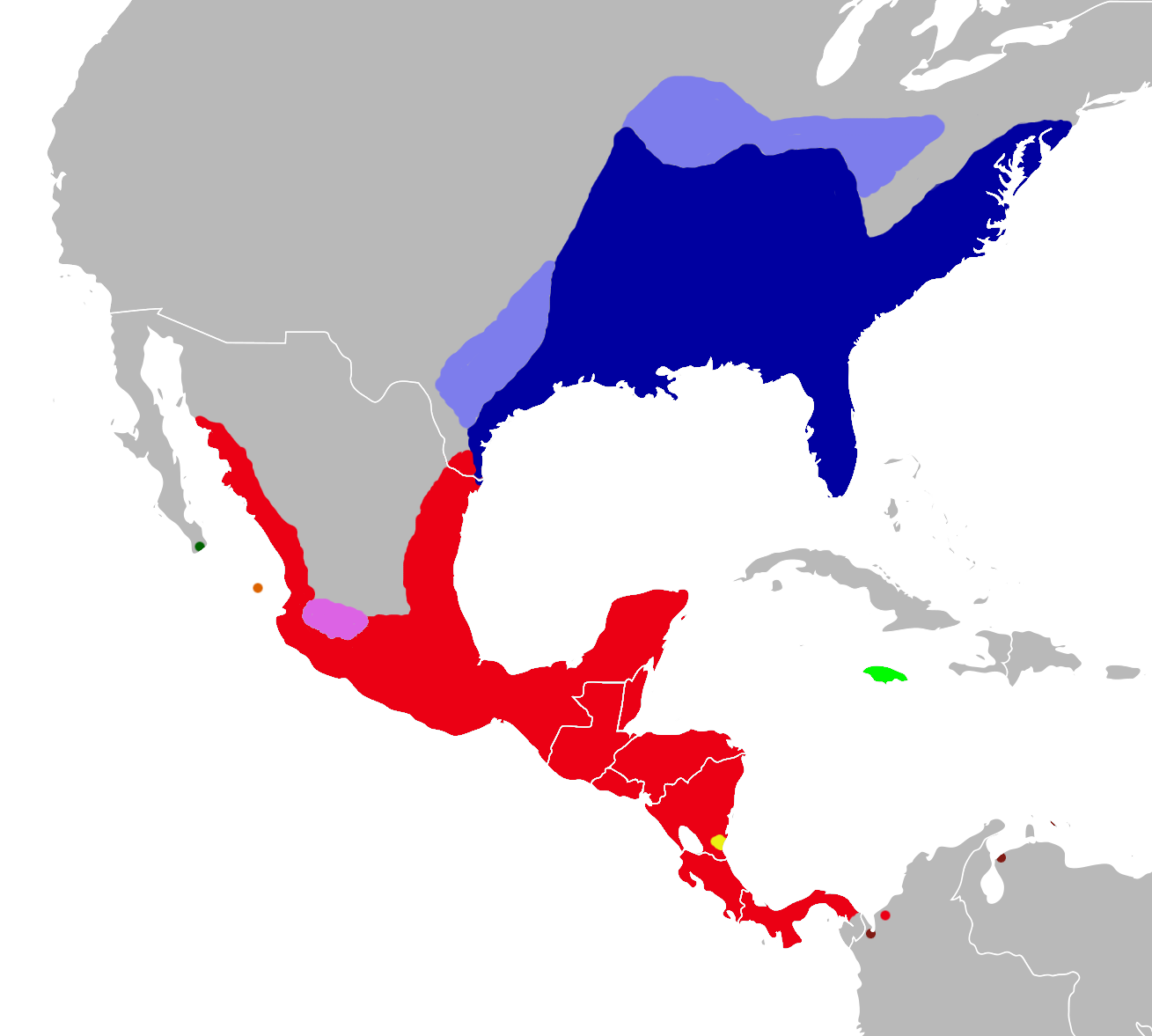
- Distribution of Oryzomys: dark blue, marsh rice rat (O. palustris); light blue, former distribution of the marsh rice rat; red, O. couesi; pink, O. albiventer; dark green, O. peninsulae; orange, O. nelsoni; light green, O. antillarum; yellow, O. dimidiatus and O. couesi; brown, O. gorgasi.

Synonyms
- Hesperomys (Oryzomys) Baird, 1857 (Note: As a subgenus of Hesperomys.); Oryzomys: Allen, 1890 (Note: First usage as genus. Goldman and Tate attribute the first usage of Oryzomys as a genus to Coues, also in 1890.); Micronectomys Hershkovitz, 1948 (Note: Nomen nudum ("naked name").)

= Oryzomys =

Oryzomys Temporal range: Rancholabrean (300,000 years before present) – present

Genus of semiaquatic rodents

Oryzomys is a genus of semiaquatic rodents in the tribe Oryzomyini living in southern North America and far northern South America. It includes eight species, two of which—the marsh rice rat (O. palustris) of the United States and O. couesi of Mexico and Central America—are widespread; the six others have more restricted distributions. The species have had eventful taxonomic histories, and most species were at one time included in the marsh rice rat; additional species may be recognized in the future. The name Oryzomys was established in 1857 by Spencer Fullerton Baird for the marsh rice rat and was soon applied to over a hundred species of American rodents. Subsequently, the genus gradually became more narrowly defined until its current contents were established in 2006, when ten new genera were established for species previously placed in Oryzomys.

Species of Oryzomys are medium-sized rats with long, coarse fur. The upperparts are gray to reddish and the underparts white to buff. The animals have broad feet with reduced or absent ungual tufts of hair around the claws and, in at least some species, with webbing between the toes. The rostrum (front part of the skull) is broad and the braincase is high. Both the marsh rice rat and O. couesi have 56 chromosomes, lack a gall bladder, and have a complex penis (as is characteristic of the Sigmodontinae) with some traits that are rare among oryzomyines; these characteristics are unknown in the other species of this genus.

The habitat includes various kinds of wetlands, such as lakes, marshes, and rivers. Oryzomys species swim well, are active during the night, and eat both plant and animal food. They build woven nests of vegetation. After a gestation period of 21 to 28 days, about four young are born. Species of Oryzomys are infected by numerous parasites and carry at least three hantaviruses, one of which (Bayou virus) also infects humans. Two, maybe three, species have gone extinct over the last two centuries and at least one other is endangered, but the widespread marsh rice rat and O. couesi are not threatened.

== Taxonomy ==
Oryzomys is one of about thirty genera within the tribe Oryzomyini, a diverse group of well over a hundred species, many of which were formerly also included in Oryzomys. Oryzomyini is one of several tribes within the subfamily Sigmodontinae of the family Cricetidae, which includes hundreds of other species of mainly small rodents, distributed mainly in the Americas and Eurasia.

Within Oryzomyini, a 2006 phylogenetic analysis by Marcelo Weksler which used both morphological and DNA sequence data found some evidence that Oryzomys is most closely related to a group including Holochilus, Lundomys, and Pseudoryzomys. Although analyses based on morphological and combined data supported this relationship, sequences of the Rbp3 gene alone instead placed Oryzomys among a group that included Nectomys, Sigmodontomys, and a few other genera. In all analyses, Oryzomys appeared within clade D of Oryzomyini. The relationship between Oryzomys and the Holochilus group was supported by five synapomorphies (shared derived characters)—absence or reduction of both the hypothenar and interdigital pads; reduction of ungual tufts of hairs surrounding the claws; having the back margin of the zygomatic plate of the skull at the same level as the front of the first upper molar; and the anterocone (front cusp) of the first upper molar divided by an anteromedian fossette. The first three are adaptations to the semiaquatic lifestyle that Oryzomys and the members of the Holochilus group share, and may thus be examples of convergent evolution.

=== Circumscription ===
The name Oryzomys was introduced in 1857 by Spencer Fullerton Baird for the marsh rice rat (now Oryzomys palustris) of the eastern United States, which had been first described twenty years earlier by Richard Harlan. The name combines the Greek oryza "rice" and mys "mouse" and refers to the feeding habits of the marsh rice rat. Baird placed Oryzomys as a subgenus of the now-defunct genus Hesperomys and included only the marsh rice rat in it, a classification which was followed by Elliott Coues in 1874 and 1877. In 1890, Oryzomys was raised to generic rank, and in subsequent years numerous additional species were ascribed to it, many of which were soon moved to separate genera. In the 1898 Catalogus Mammalium, Édouard Louis Trouessart listed 67 species of Oryzomys, including some that are now placed in Calomys, Necromys, Thomasomys, and other genera unrelated to Oryzomys. Some of the new genera proposed were soon subsumed in Oryzomys again, and in The Families and Genera of Living Rodents (1941), John Ellerman listed Microryzomys, Oligoryzomys, Melanomys, Nesoryzomys, and Oecomys as synonyms of Oryzomys and included about 127 species in it. In 1948, Philip Hershkovitz suggested that other oryzomyines like Nectomys and Megalomys could as well be included in Oryzomys, and Clayton Ray followed this suggestion in 1962.

Hershkovitz and Ray's classification was never widely followed, and from 1976 on authors started to reinstate some of the other groups lumped in Oryzomys as separate genera. The genus was reduced to 43 species (out of 110 in Oryzomyini) in the third edition (2005) of Mammal Species of the World, but it was still not a natural, monophyletic group; rather, it mostly united those oryzomyines that lacked the conspicuous specializations of other genera. In 2006, Marcelo Weksler's comprehensive phylogenetic analysis produced further evidence that the genus was polyphyletic, as species of Oryzomys were dispersed all over the oryzomyine tree. He proposed that eleven new genera should be created to accommodate those species that were not closely related to the type species of Oryzomys, the marsh rice rat; he considered other options that would require fewer new genera, but argued that that would result in less meaningful genus-level groups in Oryzomyini. Later in the same year, Weksler, Percequillo, and Voss created ten new genera—Aegialomys, Cerradomys, Eremoryzomys, Euryoryzomys, Hylaeamys, Mindomys, Nephelomys, Oreoryzomys, Sooretamys, and Transandinomys—for species formerly placed in Oryzomys and placed six more species related to "Oryzomys" alfaroi in Handleyomys pending the description of more new genera for them. They left only five species in Oryzomys, which was now finally a natural, monophyletic group. Because of subsequent taxonomic work, the number of species has since increased to at least eight.

Some problems remain: ?Oryzomys pliocaenicus, a Miocene fossil from Kansas, is of uncertain identity but may belong in Bensonomys, and fossils from the Miocene of Oregon and Pliocene of New Mexico have also been ascribed to Oryzomys, but probably incorrectly. A possible Oryzomys has been recorded from the Irvingtonian (Pleistocene) of Saskatchewan.

=== Species ===
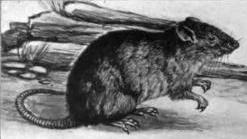
Drawing of Oryzomys molestus, now a synonym of Oryzomys albiventer

The current concept of Oryzomys derives from the palustris-mexicanus group recognized within a much larger genus Oryzomys by Merriam (1901) and the palustris group proposed by Goldman (1918). Merriam recognized 21 species within his group, but Goldman consolidated them into eight—the marsh rice rat in the United States, O. couesi in far southern Texas, Mexico, and Central America, and six others with small distributions. In 1960, Raymond Hall united O. couesi and the marsh rice rat into a single species, Oryzomys palustris, and thereafter, other localized forms were also included in O. palustris. Hershkovitz described another species in the group, O. gorgasi from Colombia, in 1970 and the next year he noted that O. dimidiatus, previously classified as a Nectomys, was similar to O. palustris. After 1979, the marsh rice rat and O. couesi were again regarded as separate as a result of further work in Texas, where their ranges meet. While reviewing O. gorgasi in 2001, J. Sánchez H. and colleagues redefined and characterized the O. palustris group and listed O. couesi, O. dimidiatus, O. gorgasi, and the marsh rice rat as its members; Guy Musser and Michael Carleton in the 2005 third edition of Mammal Species of the World additionally listed O. nelsoni from María Madre Island in western Mexico.

In 2006, Weksler and colleagues followed the 2001 definition by Sánchez and others for the restricted genus Oryzomys, but added O. antillarum from Jamaica as a species. Carleton and Joaquin Arroyo-Cabrales reviewed Oryzomys from western Mexico in 2009 and in this context provided an extended diagnosis of Oryzomys. They recognized eight species: the six previously mentioned plus O. albiventer and O. peninsulae. Also in 2009, Robert Voss and Weksler identified the subfossil Oryzomys curasoae from Curaçao as an island population of O. gorgasi. The next year, Delton Hanson and colleagues published a study using DNA sequence data from the cytochrome b, interphotoreceptor retinoid-binding protein, and alcohol dehydrogenase 1 genes to assess relationships within Oryzomys. They recommended that the marsh rice rat be split into two species and that O. couesi be split into four species on the basis of the observed sequence divergence and other data.

Merriam divided his palustris-mexicanus group in two "series" according to the color of the underparts (white or fulvous). Goldman divided his palustris group in two "sections"—a couesi section with O. couesi and six related species, and a palustris section with O. palustris only. He noted that the latter differed from the former in the generally darker, more brownish, longer fur, and larger sphenopalatine vacuities (openings in the mesopterygoid fossa, the gap behind the end of the palate). As Weksler's 2006 analysis included only O. couesi and the marsh rice rat among species of Oryzomys in the strict sense, he could not test those groups. Carleton and Arroyo-Cabrales concurred with Goldman's division, listing additional characters, and noted that the palustris group may be more semiaquatically adapted than the members of the couesi group are. In the latter, the fur is usually reddish-brown, as opposed to grayish-brown in the palustris group. Members of the couesi group have smaller sphenopalatine vacuities and a smaller sphenopalatine foramen, a foramen (opening) in the side of the skull above the molars, and a more highly developed anterolabial cingulum on the third lower molar (a crest at the front of the tooth). The hypothenar pad of the hindfoot, located on the sole far from the fingers, is present in the couesi group, but absent in the palustris group. Interdigital webbing may be more highly developed in the palustris group. Using morphological data, Voss and Weksler found a closer relationship between O. couesi and O. gorgasi to the exclusion of O. palustris, but with low confidence. The DNA sequence data of Hanson and colleagues supported a deep separation between the palustris and couesi groups, but a Costa Rican sample (assigned to O. couesi) was about as distant from the two groups as they were from each other.

The genus currently includes the following species:

Name	Distribution	Characteristics	Taxonomic comments
Oryzomys albiventer	Michoacán, Guanajuato, Jalisco (inland western Mexico)	Large, long tail, robust skull	Described in 1901 as a species; subspecies of O. couesi in 1918; reinstated as a species in 2009
Oryzomys antillarum	Jamaica (extinct)	Long nasal bones, short incisive foramina (perforations in the palate), robust zygomatic arches (cheekbones)	Described in 1898 as a species; subspecies of O. couesi in 1966; reinstated as a species in 1993/2006
Oryzomys couesi	Southern Texas and coastal Sonora (northwestern Mexico) to northwestern Colombia	Upperparts buff to reddish, underparts white to buff, sphenopalatine vacuities small to absent	Described in 1877 as a species; subspecies of marsh rice rat in 1960; reinstated as a species in 1979; various other species split from and lumped into it from time to time. Genetic data suggest four species may be present: one along the Pacific coast from Sonora to El Salvador; one from Texas to Nicaragua; one in Costa Rica; and one in Panama.
Oryzomys dimidiatus	Southeastern Nicaragua	Gray underparts, brown feet, tail nearly the same color above as below	Described in 1905 as a species of Nectomys; reclassified in Oryzomys in 1948
Oryzomys gorgasi	Northwestern Colombia, northwestern Venezuela; extinct on Curaçao	Robust rostrum (front part of skull); incisive foramina tapering at the back; sphenopalatine vacuities absent; subsquamosal fenestra (opening at the back of the skull) small	Described in 1970; Oryzomys curasoae described in 2001; both synonymized in 2009
Oryzomys nelsoni	María Madre Island, Nayarit, western Mexico (extinct)	Large, long tail, rostrum heavy and bent downward, incisors large and wide	Described in 1898 as a species; subspecies of O. palustris in 1971; otherwise regarded as a distinct species
Marsh rice rat (Oryzomys palustris)	In the eastern United States from New Jersey and Kansas south to Florida and Texas, and into Tamaulipas, Mexico; previously further north to Iowa and southwestern Pennsylvania	Compared to sympatric O. couesi where the two meet: short tail, white underparts, sphenopalatine foramen large	Described in 1827; specific status of Florida Keys form (argentatus; first described in 1978) disputed; genetic data suggest populations west of Alabama may be a separate species
Oryzomys peninsulae	Southern tip of Baja California Sur (perhaps extinct)	Moderately large, gray on head and forequarters, broad, squared zygomatic arches, long, broad incisive foramina, upper incisor nearly orthodont	Described in 1899 as a species; subspecies of O. palustris in 1971 and of O. couesi in 1994; reinstated as a species in 2009

== Description ==
Measurements of species of Oryzomys
Species	n (Note: Number of specimens measured.)	Total length	Tail	Hindfoot
O. albiventer	12	285.4 (245–314)	155.4 (129–173)	36.1 (33–40)
O. antillarum	3	247 (228–260)	119.7 (108–132)	29.3 (28–30)
O. couesi from Nayarit	62	244.8 (210–288)	125.1 (105–150)	30.5 (27–33)
O. dimidiatus	3	249 (228–278)	129 (110–150)	28.3 (27–31)
O. gorgasi	6–10 (Note: Six for total length, eight for tail length, and ten for hindfoot length.)	259 (220–290)	130 (116–138)	31 (30–32)
O. nelsoni	4	322 (288–344)	181.5 (160–191)	37.3 (35–39)
Marsh rice rat	–	226–305	108–156	28–37
O. peninsulae	14	265.6 (227–305)	136.8 (114–156)	32.0 (29–34)
Measurements are in millimeters and in the form "average (minimum–maximum)".

Oryzomys contains medium-sized, semiaquatically specialized oryzomyine rodents. They have long, coarse fur that is grayish to reddish on the upperparts and white to buff on the underparts. The marsh rice rat superficially resembles the introduced species black rat and brown rat, but has larger differences in color between the upper- and underparts. The vibrissae (whiskers) are short and the ears are small and well-haired. The tail is usually as long as or longer than the head and body and is sparsely haired, but the hairs on the lower side are longer than those above. Females have eight mammae, as in most oryzomyines. The hindfeet are broad and have the first and fifth digits notably shorter than the middle three. The upper surface is hairy, but the underside is naked and covered with small irregularities (squamae). The pads are generally poorly developed, as are the ungual tufts. Interdigital webbing may be present, but its development is variable within the genus.

The karyotype has been recorded in various populations of the marsh rice rat and O. couesi and is apparently stable within the genus at 56 chromosomes, with the fundamental number of chromosomal arms ranging from 56 to 60 (2n = 56, FN = 56–60). In both species, the stomach has the characteristic pattern of sigmodontines (unilocular-hemiglandular): it is not split in two chambers by an incisura angularis and the front part (antrum) is covered by a glandular epithelium. Furthermore, the gall bladder is absent, a synapomorphy of Oryzomyini.

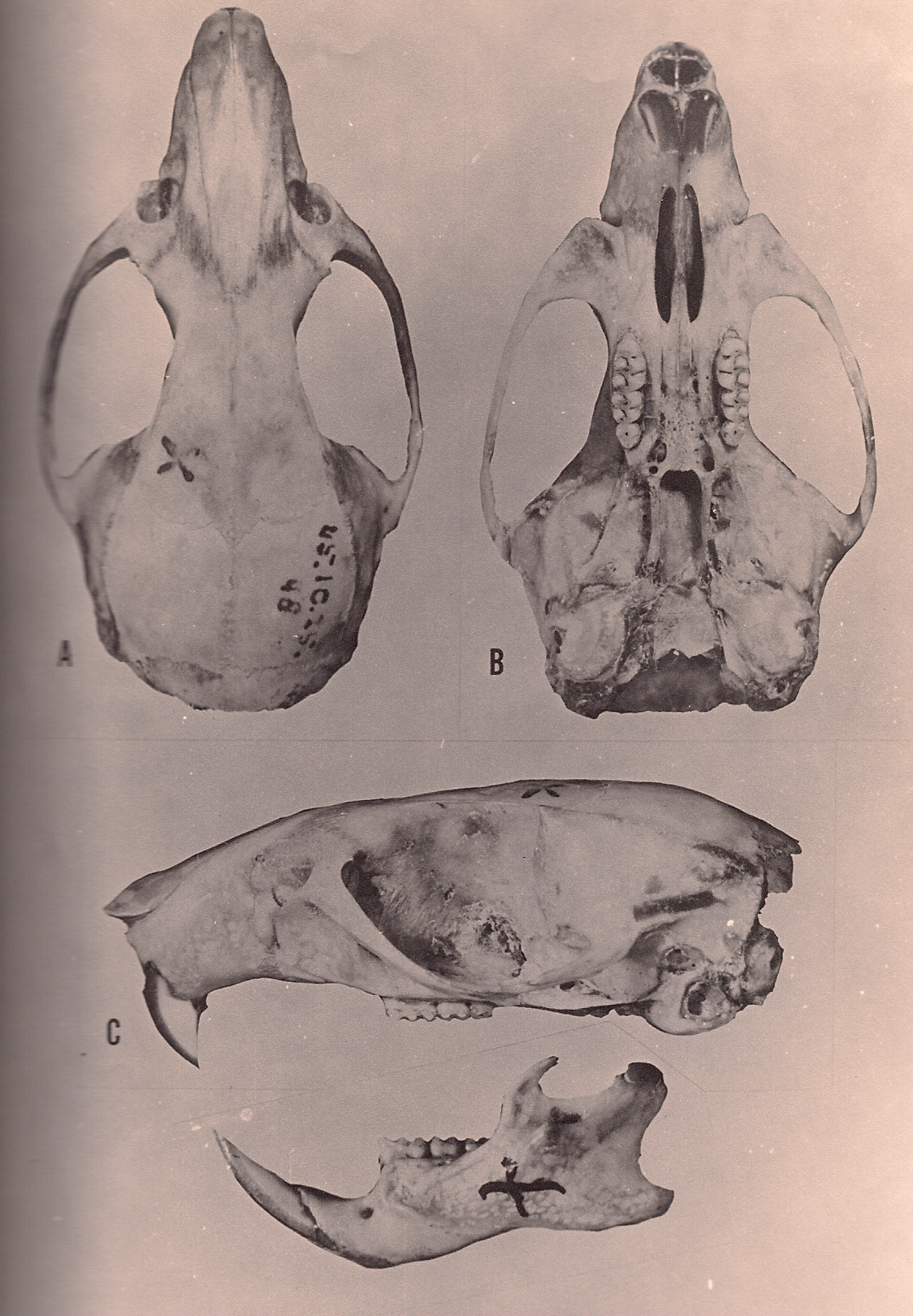
Holotype skull of O. antillarum, seen from above (A), below (B) and the left (C)

Oryzomys species have a large skull with a short rostrum and high braincase. The interorbital region, located between the eyes, is narrowest to the front and is flanked by well-developed beads at its margins. The zygomatic plate is broad and has a well-developed zygomatic notch at its front. The zygomatic arch is robust and contains a small but distinct jugal bone. The interparietal bone, part of the roof of the braincase, is narrow and short; its narrowness is a synapomorphy for O. couesi plus the marsh rice rat according to Weksler's analysis. The incisive foramina are long, with their back margin at the front of the first molars or further back. The palate is also long, extending beyond the back margin of the maxillary bone, and is perforated near the third molars by well-developed posterolateral palatal pits. There is no alisphenoid strut, an extension of the alisphenoid bone that in some other oryzomyines separates two foramina in the skull. The auditory bullae are large. The condition of the arteries in the head is highly derived. In the mandible (lower jaw), the coronoid process, a process at the back, is well developed and the capsular process, a raising of the mandibular bone housing the root of the lower incisor, is conspicuous.

As usual in oryzomyines, the molars are pentalophodont (have the mesolophs and mesolophids, accessory crests, well developed) and bunodont, with the cusps higher than the connecting crests. The cusps on the upper molars are arranged in two longitudinal series, not three as in the black and brown rats. The front cusps of the first upper and lower molar (anterocone and anteroconid, respectively) are broad and not divided completely by an anteromedian flexus or flexid. Behind the anterocone, the anteroloph (a smaller crest) is complete and separated from the anterocone. On both the second and third lower molars, the anterolophid (a crest on the inner front corner) is present, a putative synapomorphy of the genus. The first molars have additional small roots in addition to the main ones, so that the upper first molar has four and the lower has three or four roots.

As is characteristic of Sigmodontinae, the marsh rice rat and O. couesi have a complex penis, with the baculum (penis bone) displaying large protuberances at the sides. The outer surface of the penis is mostly covered by small spines, but there is a broad band of nonspinous tissue. The papilla (nipple-like projection) on the dorsal (upper) side of the penis is covered with small spines, a character these two species share only with Oligoryzomys among oryzomyines examined. On the urethral process, located in the crater at the end of the penis, a fleshy process (the subapical lobule) is present; it is absent in all other oryzomyines with studied penes except Holochilus brasiliensis. Both traits are recovered as synapomorphies of O. couesi plus the marsh rice rat in Weksler's analysis.

== Distribution, ecology, and behavior ==
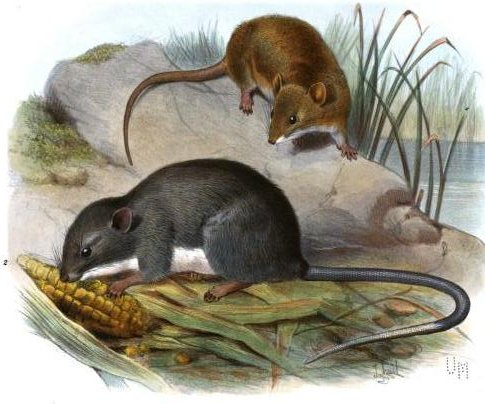
Oryzomys couesi (above) and Tylomys panamensis (below)

The range of Oryzomys extends from New Jersey in the eastern United States through Mexico and Central America south to northwestern Colombia and east to northwestern Venezuela and Curaçao. Species of Oryzomys usually live in wet habitats such as marshes, streams, and mangroves, but both the marsh rice rat and O. couesi are also occasionally encountered in drier habitats. They occur or occurred on many continental-shelf islands and one oceanic island, Jamaica; their adeptness at colonizing islands may be caused by their close association with water and frequent occurrence in coastal wetlands. The oldest fossils date to the Rancholabrean of the United States, about 300,000 years ago; although there have been some earlier North American records, those are not in fact referable to Oryzomys or even Oryzomyini. Oryzomyines likely evolved in South America east of the Andes; the presence of Oryzomys in Central America and other trans-Andean regions is thought to be the result of one of several independent invasions of this region by oryzomyines. Alternatively, Oryzomys may have evolved from the Pliocene North American Jacobsomys. O. antillarum may have reached Jamaica during the last glacial period while sea levels were low.

Behavior is known mainly from the marsh rice rat and O. couesi, with some scattered data from the other species. Oryzomys are semiaquatic, spending much time in the water, and otherwise mainly live on the ground; both the marsh rice rat and O. couesi are known to be excellent swimmers and will flee into the water when disturbed. Both are also active during the night and build nests of interwoven vegetation, which may be suspended above the water. Breeding may occur throughout the year in both species, but is known to be seasonally variable in the marsh rice rat. In both, gestation takes about 21 to 28 days and litter size is usually one to seven, averaging three to five. Young marsh rice rats and O. couesi become reproductively active when about 50 days old.

The marsh rice rat, O. couesi, and O. gorgasi are known to be omnivores, eating both plant and animal material. They eat both seeds and green plant parts and consume a variety of animals, including insects, crustaceans, and many others. The American barn owl (Tyto furcata) is a major predator on the marsh rice rat and remains of O. antillarum, O. couesi, and O. gorgasi have been found in owl pellet deposits. Several other animals are known to prey on Oryzomys. A variety of parasites are known from O. couesi and the marsh rice rat and two parasitic nematodes have been found in O. gorgasi.

== Human interactions ==
Two species of Oryzomys, O. antillarum and O. nelsoni, have gone extinct since the 19th century, and a third, O. peninsulae, is unlikely to be still extant. Their extinction may have been caused by habitat destruction and by introduced species such as the small Asian mongoose and the brown and black rat. These same causes may threaten O. gorgasi, which the IUCN Red List assesses as "Endangered". O. albiventer has been affected by human alteration of its habitat, but likely still survives. In contrast, the widespread species, the marsh rice rat and O. couesi, are common and of no conservation concern—indeed, both have been considered a pest—but some populations are threatened. Like these two species, O. dimidiatus is assessed as "Least Concern" by the Red List.

The marsh rice rat is the natural reservoir of the Bayou virus, the second most common cause of hantavirus pulmonary syndrome in the United States. Two other hantaviruses, Catacamas virus and Playa de Oro virus, occur in O. couesi in Honduras and western Mexico, respectively, but are not known to infect humans.

== Literature cited ==
- Allen, J.A. 1890. Notes on collections of mammals made in Central America and southern Mexico, by Dr. Audley C. Buller, with descriptions of new species of the genera Vespertilio, Sciurus, and Lepus. Bulletin of the American Museum of Natural History 3(11):175–194.
- Alston, E.R. 1882. Biologia centrali-americana. Mammalia. R.H. Porter, 220 pp.
- Anthony, H.E. 1920. A zoologist in Jamaica. Natural History 20:157–168.
- Baird, S.F. 1857. Mammals: General report upon the zoology of the several Pacific railroad routes. Reports of explorations and surveys to ascertain the most practicable and economical route for a railroad from the Mississippi River to the Pacific Ocean (Senate executive document 78, Washington, D.C.) 8(1):1–757.
- Barnard, W.P., Ernst, J.V. and Stevens, R.O. 1971. Eimeria palustris sp. n. and Isospora hammondi sp. n. (Coccidia: Eimeriidae) from the marsh rice rat, Oryzomys palustris (Harlan)] (subscription required). The Journal of Parasitology 57(6):1293–1296 JSTOR 3277983.
- Bloch, C.P. and Rose, R.K. 2005. Population dynamics of Oryzomys palustris and Microtus pennsylvanicus in Virginia tidal marshes (subscription required). Northeastern Naturalist 12(3):295–306 JSTOR 3858686 doi:10.1656/1092-6194(2005)012[0295:PDOOPA]2.0.CO;2.
- Carleton, M.D. and Arroyo-Cabrales, J. 2009. Review of the Oryzomys couesi complex (Rodentia: Cricetidae: Sigmodontinae) in Western Mexico. Bulletin of the American Museum of Natural History 331:94–127.
- Chu, Y.-K., Owen, R.D., Sánchez-Hernández, C., Romero-Almarez, M. de L. and Jonsson, C.B. 2008. Genetic characterization and phylogeny of a hantavirus from Western Mexico (subscription required). Virus Research 131:180–188.
- Churcher, C.S. 1984. Faunal correlations of Pleistocene deposits in western Canada. pp. 145–158 in Mahaney, W.C. (ed.). Correlation of Quaternary Chronologies. Norwich, UK: Geo Books, 517 pp. ISBN 978-0-86094-172-9
- Cook, W.M., Timm, R.M. and Hyman, D.E. 2001. Swimming ability in three Costa Rican dry forest rodents. Revista de Biología Tropical 49(3–4):1177–1181.
- Coues, E. 1874. Synopsis of the Muridæ of North America. Proceedings of the Academy of Natural Sciences of Philadelphia 26:173–196.
- Coues, E. 1877. Muridae. pp. x+264 in Coues, E. and Allen, J.A. Monographs of North American Rodentia. Report of the United States Geological Survey of the Territories 11:xii+x+1091 pp.
- Coues, E. 1890. Oryzomys. p. 4164 in Whitney, W.D. (ed.). The Century Dictionary and Cyclopedia, Vol. V. The Century Company.
- Eckerlin, R.P. 2005. Fleas (Siphonaptera) of the Yucatan Peninsula (Campeche, Quintana Roo, and Yucatan), Mexico. Caribbean Journal of Science 41(1):152–157.
- Ellerman, J.R. 1941. The Families and Genera of Living Rodents. Volume II. Family Muridae. London: printed by order of the Trustees of the British Museum, 690 pp.
- Eliot, D.G. 1904. The land and sea mammals of Middle America and the West Indies. Field Columbian Museum, Zoölogical Series 4(1):i–xxi, 1–439.
- Esher, R.J., Wolfe, J.L. and Layne, J.N. 1978. Swimming behavior of rice rats (Oryzomys palustris) and cotton rats (Sigmodon hispidus) (subscription required). Journal of Mammalogy 59(3):551–558 JSTOR 1380231 doi:10.2307/1380231.
- Goldman, E.A. 1918. The rice rats of North America. North American Fauna 43:1–100.
- Hall, E.R. and Dalquest, W.W. 1963. The mammals of Veracruz. University of Kansas Publications, Museum of Natural History 14:165–362.
- Hanson, J.D., Indorf, J.L., Swier, V.J. and Bradley, R.D. 2010. Molecular divergence within the Oryzomys palustris complex: evidence for multiple species. Journal of Mammalogy 91(2):336–347 doi:10.1644/08-MAMM-A-342.1.
- Hershkovitz, P. 1948. Mammals of northern Colombia. Preliminary report No. 3: Water rats (genus Nectomys), with supplemental notes on related forms. Proceedings of the United States National Museum 98:49–56.
- Hershkovitz, P. 1970. Supplementary notes on Neotropical Oryzomys dimidiatus and Oryzomys hammondi (Cricetinae) (subscription required). Journal of Mammalogy 51(4):789–794 JSTOR 1378303 doi:10.2307/1378303.
- Hershkovitz, P. 1971. A new rice rat of the Oryzomys palustris group (Cricetinae, Muridae) from northwestern Colombia, with remarks on distribution (subscription required). Journal of Mammalogy 52(4):700–709 JSTOR 1378917 doi:10.2307/1378917.
- Hofmann, J.E., Gardner, J.E. and Moris, M.J. 1990. Distribution, abundance, and habitat of the marsh rice rat (Oryzomys palustris) in southern Illinois. Transactions of the Illinois State Academy of Science 83(3–4):162–180.
- Hooper, E.T. and Musser, G.G. 1964. The glans penis in Neotropical cricetines (Family Muridae) with comments on classification of muroid rodents. Miscellaneous Publications of the University of Michigan Museum of Zoology 123:1–57.
- Jones, J.K., Jr. and Engstrom, M.D. 1986. Synopsis of the rice rats (genus Oryzomys) of Nicaragua. Occasional Papers, The Museum, Texas Tech University 103:1–23.
- Kruchek, B.L. 2004. Use of tidal marsh and upland habitats by the marsh rice rat (Oryzomys palustris). Journal of Mammalogy 85(3):569–575 JSTOR 1383957 doi:10.1644/BEH-016.
- Lindsay, E.H. 2008. Cricetidae. pp. 456–479 in Janis, C.M., Gunnell, G.F. and Uhen, M.D. (eds.). Evolution of Tertiary Mammals of North America. Volume 2: Small Mammals, Xenarthrans, and Marine Mammals. Cambridge University Press, 802 pp. ISBN 978-0-521-78117-6
- Linzey, A.V. and Hammerson, G. 2008. Oryzomys palustris. In IUCN. IUCN Red List of Threatened Species. Version 2009.2. <www.iucnredlist.org>. Downloaded on November 30, 2009.
- Linzey, A.V., Timm, R., Woodman, N., Matson, J. & Samudio, R. 2016. Oryzomys couesi (errata version published in 2017). The IUCN Red List of Threatened Species 2016. doi:10.2305/IUCN.UK.2016-3.RLTS.T15592A22388237.en.
- McFarlane, D.A. and Debrot, A.O. 2001. A new species of extinct oryzomyine rodent from the Quaternary of Curaçao, Netherlands Antilles. Caribbean Journal of Science 37(3–4):182–184.
- McIntyre, N.E., Chu, Y.-K., Owen, R.D., Abuzeineh, A., de la Sancha, N., Dick, C.W., Holsomback, T. Nisbett, R.A. and Jonsson, C. 2005. A longitudinal study of Bayou virus, hosts, and habitat. American Journal of Tropical Medicine and Hygiene 73:1043–1049 PMID 16354810.
- Medellín, X.L. and Medellín, R.A. 2006. Oryzomys couesi (Alston, 1877). pp. 709–710 in Ceballos, G. and Oliva, G. (eds.). Los mamíferos silvestres de México. Mexico City: Comisión Nacional para el Conocimiento y Uso de la Biodiversidad and Fondo de Cultura Económica, 986 pp. ISBN 978-970-9000-30-6
- Merriam, C.H. 1901. Synopsis of the rice rats (genus Oryzomys) of the United States and Mexico. Proceedings of the Washington Academy of Sciences 3:273–295.
- Milazzo, M.L., Cajimat, M.N., Hanson, J.D., Bradley, R.D., Quintana, M., Sherman, C., Velásquez, R.T. and Fulhorst, C.F. 2006. Catacamas virus, a hantaviral species naturally associated with Oryzomys couesi (Coues' oryzomys) in Honduras. American Journal of Tropical Medicine and Hygiene 75(5):1003–1010.
- Morgan, G.S. 1993. Quaternary land vertebrates of Jamaica. Geological Society of America Memoir 182:417–442.
- Musser, G.G. and Carleton, M.D. 2005. Superfamily Muroidea. pp. 894–1531 in Wilson, D.E. and Reeder, D.M. (eds.). Mammal Species of the World: a taxonomic and geographic reference. 3rd ed. Baltimore: The Johns Hopkins University Press, 2 vols., 2142 pp. ISBN 978-0-8018-8221-0
- Pardiñas, U.F.J., D'Elía, G. and Ortiz, P.E. 2002. Sigmodontinos fósiles (Rodentia, Muroidea, Sigmodontinae) de América del sur: Estado actual de su conocimiento y prospectiva. Mastozoología Neotropical 9(2):209–252 (in Spanish).
- Ray, C.E. 1962. The Oryzomyine Rodents of the Antillean Subregion. Doctor of Philosophy thesis, Harvard University, 211 pp.
- Reid, F. 2009. A Field Guide to the Mammals of Central America and Southeast Mexico. 2nd edition. Oxford University Press US, 346 pp. ISBN 978-0-19-534322-9
- Richards, R.L. 1980. Rice rat (Oryzomys cf. palustris) remains from southern Indiana caves. Proceedings of the Indiana Academy of Sciences 89:425–431.
- Sánchez H., J., Ochoa G., J. and Voss, R.S. 2001. Rediscovery of Oryzomys gorgasi (Rodentia: Muridae) with notes on taxonomy and natural history (subscription required). Mammalia 65:205–214 doi:10.1515/mamm.2001.65.2.205.
- Schmidly, D.J. and Davis, W.B. 2004. The mammals of Texas. 2nd edition. University of Texas Press, 501 pp. ISBN 978-0-292-70241-7
- Schmidt, C.A. and Engstrom, M.D. 1994. Genic variation and systematics of rice rats (Oryzomys palustris species group) in southern Texas and northeastern Tamaulipas, Mexico. Journal of Mammalogy 75(4):914-928 JSTOR 1382473 doi:10.2307/1382473.
- Schwartz, C.W. and Schwartz, E.R. 2001. The wild mammals of Missouri. University of Missouri Press, 368 pp. ISBN 978-0-8262-1359-4
- Tate, G.H.H. 1932. The taxonomic history of the South and Central American cricetid rodents of the genus Oryzomys. Part 1, Subgenus Oryzomys. American Museum Novitates 579:1–18.
- Timm, R. & Reid, F. 2019. Oryzomys dimidiatus. The IUCN Red List of Threatened Species 2019. doi:10.2305/IUCN.UK.2019-1.RLTS.T15594A22387864.en.
- Trouessart, E.L. 1898. Catalogus mammalium tam viventium quam fossilium. Tomus 2. Berlin: R. Friedländer and Sohn, 1469 pp. (in Latin).
- Underwood, H.T., Owen, J.G. and Engstrom, M.D. 1986. Endohelminths of three species of Oryzomys (Rodentia: Cricetidae) from San Luis Potosí, Mexico (subscription required). The Southwestern Naturalist 31(3):410–411 JSTOR 3671854.
- Vega, R., Vázquez-Domínguez, E., Mejía-Puente, A. and Cuaro, A.D. 2004. Unexpected high levels of genetic variability and the population structure of an island endemic rodent (Oryzomys couesi cozumelae). Biological Conservation 137:210–222 doi:10.1016/j.biocon.2007.02.007.
- Voss, R.S. and Weksler, M.W. 2009. On the taxonomic status of Oryzomys curasoae McFarlane and Debrot, 2001, (Rodentia: Cricetidae: Sigmodontinae) with remarks on the phylogenetic relationships of O. gorgasi Hershkovitz, 1971. Caribbean Journal of Science 45(1):73–79.
- Weksler, M. 2006. Phylogenetic relationships of oryzomyine rodents (Muroidea: Sigmodontinae): separate and combined analyses of morphological and molecular data. Bulletin of the American Museum of Natural History 296:1–149.
- Weksler, M., Percequillo, A.R. and Voss, R.S. 2006. Ten new genera of oryzomyine rodents (Cricetidae: Sigmodontinae). American Museum Novitates 3537:1–29.
- Weksler, M. & Timm, R. 2017. Oryzomys gorgasi (errata version published in 2018). The IUCN Red List of Threatened Species 2017. doi:10.2305/IUCN.UK.2017-3.RLTS.T115554360A22387922.en.
- Whitaker, J.O. and Hamilton, W.J. 1998. Mammals of the Eastern United States. Cornell University Press, 583 pp. ISBN 978-0-8014-3475-4
- Wolfe, J.L. 1982. Oryzomys palustris. Mammalian Species 176:1–5. doi:10.2307/3503921.
- Woodman, N. 1995. Morphological variation between Pleistocene and Recent samples of Cryptotis (Insectivora: Soricidae) from the Yucatán Peninsula, Mexico. Journal of Mammalogy 76(1):223–231 JSTOR 1382330 doi:10.2307/1382330.
