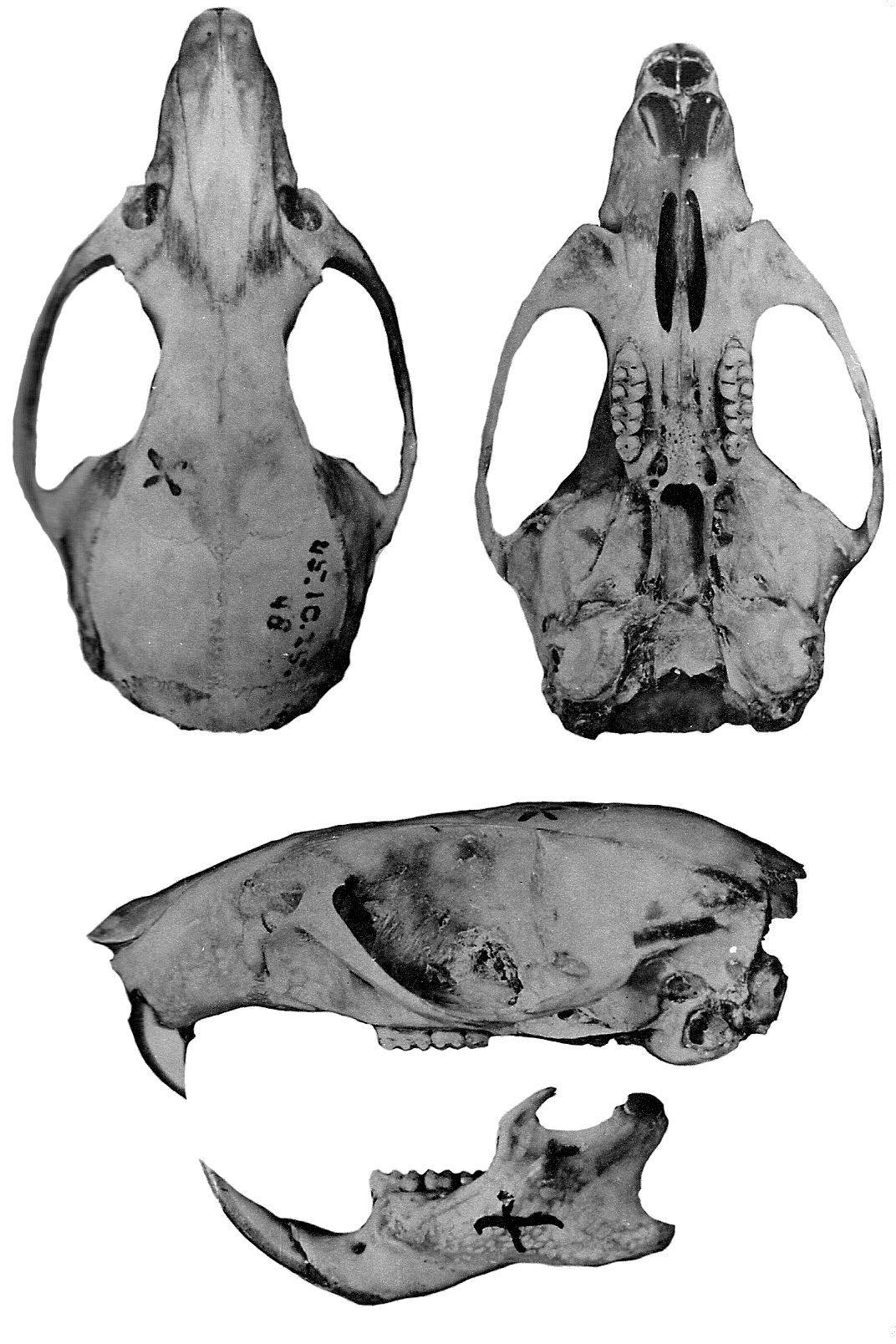
- Holotype skull, seen from above, below, and the left

Conservation status
- Extinct (1870s) (IUCN 3.1)

Scientific classification
- Kingdom: Animalia
- Phylum: Chordata
- Class: Mammalia
- Order: Rodentia
- Family: Cricetidae
- Subfamily: Sigmodontinae
- Genus: Oryzomys
- Species: †O. antillarum

Binomial name
- †Oryzomys antillarum Thomas, 1898
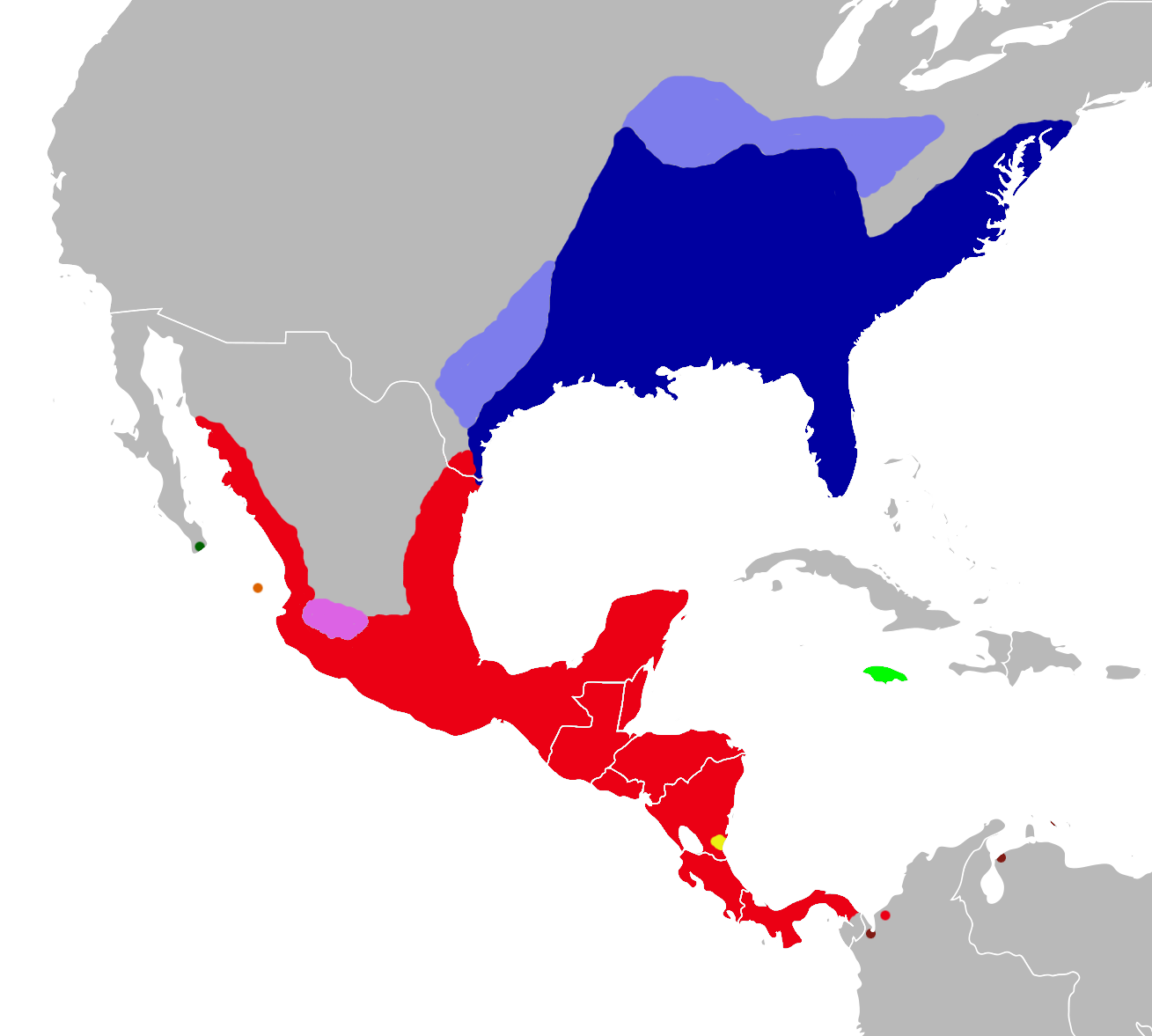
- Distribution of Oryzomys antillarum (green) and other species of Oryzomys, including O. couesi (red) and the marsh rice rat (O. palustris; blue)

Synonyms (Note: In this list of synonyms, new combinations (the first use of a given combination of a genus and species name) are indicated by a colon between the name combination and the authority which first used the combination. No colon is used when the name is entirely new.)
- Oryzomys antillarum Thomas, 1898; Oryzomys palustris antillarum: Hershkovitz, 1966; [Oryzomys couesi] antillarum: Honacki et al., 1982

= Oryzomys antillarum =

Extinct rodent species from Jamaica

Oryzomys antillarum, also known as the Jamaican rice rat, is an extinct rodent of Jamaica. A member of the genus Oryzomys within the family Cricetidae, it is similar to O. couesi of mainland Central America, from where it may have dispersed to its island during the last glacial period. Oryzomys antillarum is common in subfossil cave faunas and is also known from three specimens collected live in the 19th century. Some historical records of Jamaican rats may pertain to it. The species probably became extinct late in the 19th century, perhaps due to the introduction of the small Indian mongoose, competition with introduced rodents such as the brown rat, and habitat destruction.

Oryzomys antillarum was a medium-sized rat, similar in most respects to O. couesi. The head and body length was 120 to 132 mm (4.7 to 5.2 in) and the skull was about 30 mm (1.2 in) long. The upperparts were reddish and graded into the yellowish underparts. The tail was about as long as the head and body, sparsely haired, and darker above than below. The species differed from O. couesi in having longer nasal bones, shorter incisive foramina (perforations of the front part of the palate), and more robust zygomatic arches (cheekbones).

== Taxonomy ==
In his 1877 monograph on North American rodents, Elliott Coues mentioned two specimens of Oryzomys from Jamaica in the collections of the United States National Museum (USNM). According to Coues, the specimens were similar to the marsh rice rat (O. palustris) of the United States, but different in color. Although he wrote that they probably represented a separate form, he refrained from giving a scientific name to them because of the possibility that the form had already received a name he did not know of. The species was first formally described by Oldfield Thomas in 1898 based on a specimen that had been in the British Museum of Natural History since 1845. He recognized it as a separate species of Oryzomys, Oryzomys antillarum, but wrote that it was related to the mainland Central American O. couesi. Thomas suspected that the species was already extinct on Jamaica, but that it or a similar rice rat could still be found in the unexplored interior of Cuba or Hispaniola.

Revising North American Oryzomys in 1918, Edward Alphonso Goldman retained O. antillarum as a separate species, but conceded that it was so similar to mainland O. couesi that it may have been introduced on Jamaica. In 1920, Harold Anthony reported that remains of O. antillarum were common in coastal caves, suggesting that the species had previously been an important part of the diet of the barn owl (Tyto alba). In 1942, Glover Morrill Allen doubted that it was even a distinct species and in his 1962 Ph.D. thesis, Clayton Ray, who examined numerous cave specimens, agreed and retained it as only a "weakly differentiated subspecies" of Oryzomys palustris (which by then included O. couesi and other Mexican and Central American forms), Oryzomys palustris antillarum. Philip Hershkovitz came to the same conclusion in a 1966 paper. After O. couesi of Mexico and Central America was again classified as a species distinct from the marsh rice rat (O. palustris) of the United States, the Jamaican form came to be regarded as a subspecies of the former, Oryzomys couesi antillarum.

In a 1993 review, Gary Morgan reinstated the animal as a distinct species closely related to O. couesi, citing an unpublished paper by Humphrey, Setzer, and himself. Guy Musser and Michael Carleton, writing for the 2005 third edition of Mammal Species of the World, continued to classify the Jamaican form as part of O. couesi, but did not reference Morgan. However, in a 2006 review of the contents of Oryzomys, Marcelo Weksler and colleagues listed O. antillarum as a separate species, citing Morgan, and in a 2009 paper on western Mexican Oryzomys Carleton and Joaquín Arroyo-Cabrales did the same.

According to the classification by Carleton and Arroyo-Cabrales, Oryzomys antillarum is one of eight species in the genus Oryzomys, which occurs from the eastern United States (O. palustris) into northwestern South America (O. gorgasi). O. antillarum is further part of the O. couesi section, which is centered on the widespread Central American O. couesi and also includes various other species with more limited and peripheral distributions. Many aspects of the systematics of the O. couesi section remain unclear and it is likely that the current classification underestimates the true diversity of the group. Oryzomys previously included many other species, which were progressively removed in various studies culminating in the 2006 paper by Weksler and colleagues, which excluded more than forty species from the genus. All are classified in the tribe Oryzomyini ("rice rats"), a diverse assemblage of American rodents of over a hundred species, and on higher taxonomic levels in the subfamily Sigmodontinae of family Cricetidae, along with hundreds of other species of mainly small rodents.

== Description ==
Oryzomys antillarum was a medium-sized rodent, about as large as O. couesi. According to Thomas's description, the upperparts were reddish, slightly brighter on the rump and more grayish on the head. The color of the upperparts graded into that of the underparts, which were yellowish. The hairs of the underparts were grayish at the bases. The small ears were black on the outer and yellow on the inner side and the upper surfaces of the hands and feet were whitish. The tail was nearly naked and was light brownish above and lighter below. Goldman wrote that the specimens in the USNM were rather more reddish, but their color may have been altered because they had been preserved in alcohol. Coues had described these as rusty brown above and washed with the same color below. Andrew Arata compared the USNM specimens with examples of the reddish Florida subspecies of the marsh rice rat, Oryzomys palustris natator, for Ray and found that they were more reddish than even the most strongly colored animals from Florida.

Measurements of Oryzomys antillarum (in millimeters)
Specimen	Total length	Head and body	Tail	Hindfoot	Ear
BMNH 45.10.25.48	260	130 (Note: "Apparently stretched".)	130 (Note: "Imperfect at tip".)	28 (Note: Without claws.)	13
USNM 38299	228	120	108 (Note: "Tip broken".)	30 (Note: With claws.)	– (Note: "Wrinkled".)
USNM 38300	253	132	121	30	?12–15

The skull was generally similar to that of O. couesi, as were the teeth. It was robust and bore well-developed supraorbital ridges (located above the eyes) on the braincase. The interparietal bone, part of the roof of the braincase, was small and narrow. The bony palate extended beyond the third molars. The nasal bones extended further back than the premaxillaries, whereas these bones are usually about coterminous in O. couesi. On average, the incisive foramina, which perforate the front part of the palate, were shorter than in O. couesi. The zygomatic arch (cheekbone) appears to have been better developed in O. antillarum.

In the three modern and numerous cave specimens, condylobasal length (a measure of skull length) varies from 28.9 to 31.2 mm (1.14 to 1.23 in) (one modern and two cave specimens only), length of the bony palate from 13.0 to 17.8 mm (0.51 to 0.70 in), width of the interorbital region (located between the eyes) from 4.78 to 6.33 mm (0.188 to 0.249 in), length of the incisive foramina from 5.1 to 6.6 mm (0.20 to 0.26 in), crown length of the upper molars from 4.36 to 5.20 mm (0.172 to 0.205 in), and crown length of the lower molars from 4.80 to 5.39 mm (0.189 to 0.212 in).

== History ==
=== Origin and subfossil records ===
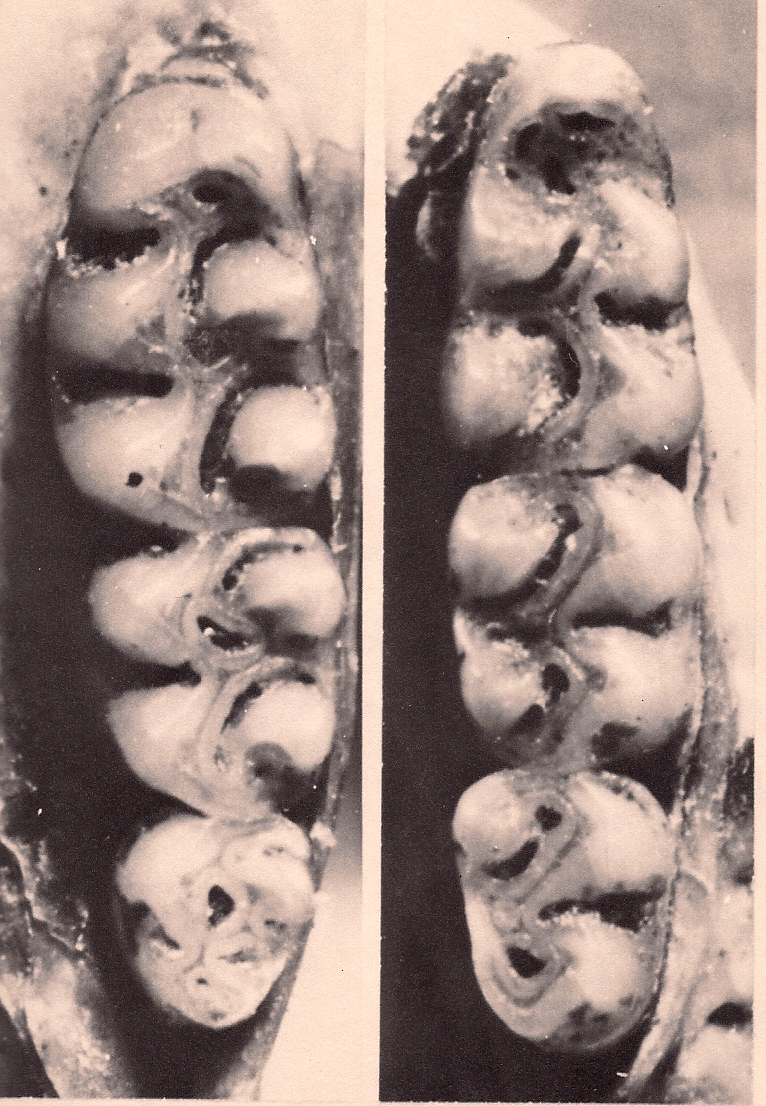
Upper (left) and lower (right) molars of the holotype of Oryzomys antillarum

The oldest well-dated record of Oryzomys antillarum is at Drum Cave in the Jacksons Bay Caves system, where it was found in a stratum radiocarbon dated to between 10,250 and 11,260 years before present according to a 2002 study. It is present in several other undated sites that predate the human colonization of the island, around 1,400 years before present. However, a site (Wallingford Roadside Cave) from the last interglacial, the Eemian, contains only the hystricognath rodents Clidomys and Geocapromys browni and lacks Oryzomys. The presence of the rice rat on Jamaica before the arrival of humans disproves the hypothesis that it was introduced; instead, it must have reached the island by overwater dispersal through a rafting event, probably less than 125,000 years ago. During the last glacial period, low sea levels would have exposed much land between Jamaica and Central America, substantially decreasing the water distance needed for the ancestor of O. antillarum to arrive on the island and probably influencing sea currents so that rafts of vegetation from Central America would be more likely to reach Jamaica. Species of Oryzomys are semiaquatic and closely associated with water, which may help to explain the occurrence of the genus on Jamaica. The rice rat has been found in many superficial, late Holocene cave deposits, some of which have been radiocarbon dated to within the last 1,100 years. Its remains also occur in some Amerindian archeological sites. From its common and widespread occurrence in caves, Ray suggested that the rice rat occurred in many different habitats before European contact. O. antillarum was the only sigmodontine rodent on any of the Greater Antilles, where the rodent fauna otherwise consists solely of hystricognaths and introduced rodents.

=== Historical records ===
Although there are some early historical records of the rats of Jamaica, very little is to be found in them regarding Oryzomys antillarum, perhaps because the species declined rapidly following the European colonization of the island and because early authors failed to distinguish it from introduced rodents (the black rat, Rattus rattus; brown rat, Rattus norvegicus; and house mouse, Mus musculus). Patrick Browne, in the 1756 Civil and Natural History of Jamaica, described a "House and Cane-Rat", a "Mouse", and a large "Water-Rat", which he said had been introduced to the island and become very common there.

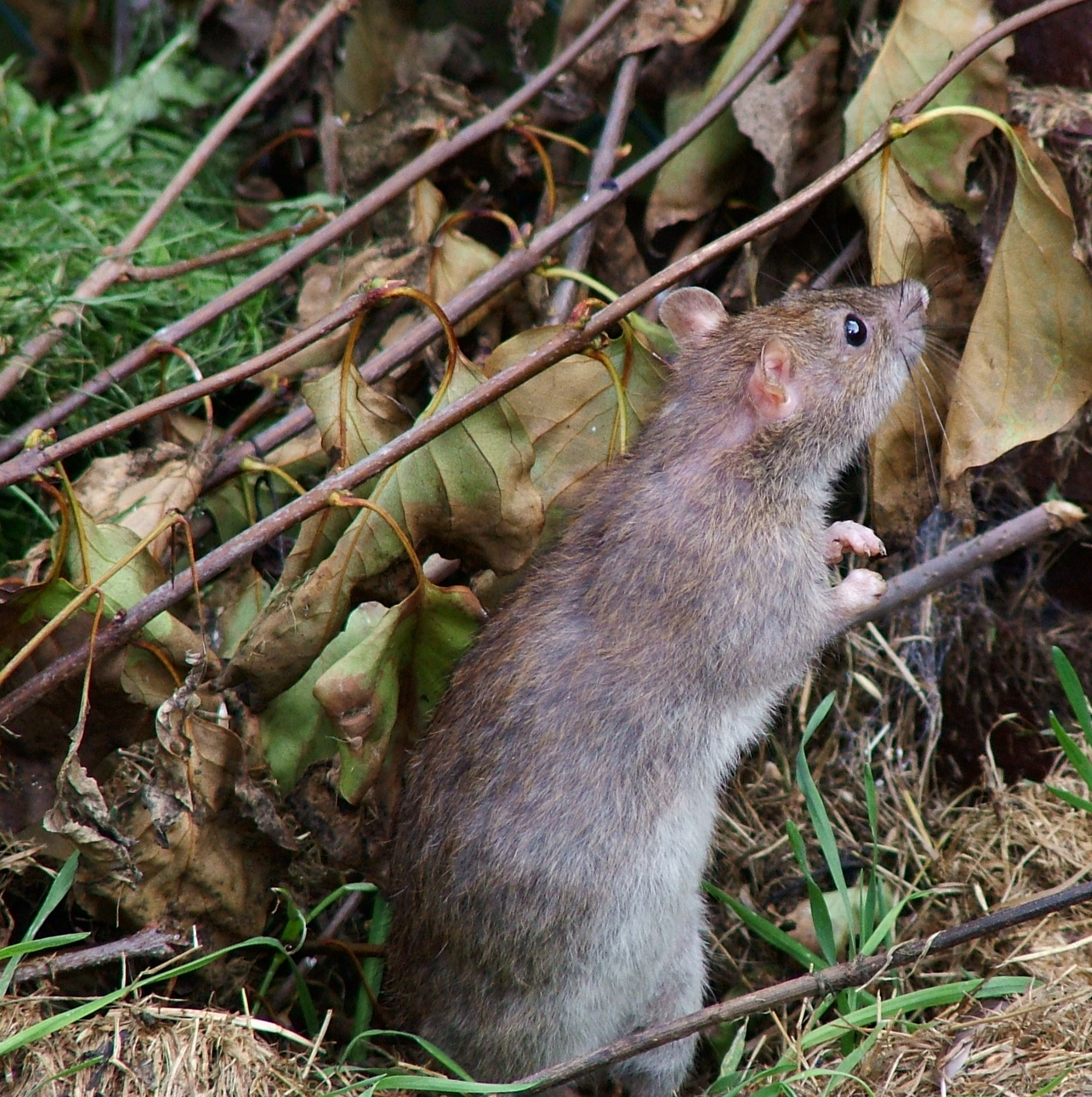
The brown rat (Rattus norvegicus) may have contributed to the extinction of Oryzomys antillarum.

In his History of Jamaica (1774), Edward Long recognized four Jamaican rats: Browne's "water-rat", termed the "Charles-price rat", which Long regarded as identical with the European water vole (Arvicola); the "black house-rat", said to have been brought from England; and two he said were indigenous. The larger of those was a grayish "cane-rat" and the smaller was a reddish "field-rat" as large as the English mole (the European mole, Talpa europaea). Ray considered that the last may simply have been the house mouse, since the size of an English mole would be too small for Oryzomys.

In A Naturalist's Sojourn in Jamaica (1851), Philip Henry Gosse listed the black and brown rat and the house mouse, as well as the "cane-piece rat", which he described as Mus saccharivorus and regarded as probably identical with Browne's "water-rat" and Long's "Charles-price rat". He also mentioned the two species Long had listed as indigenous. Thomas and Ray both asserted that this "cane-piece rat" was most likely a brown rat, as judged from its measurements. Gosse wrote that an early explorer, Anthony Robinson, had described and pictured this species in an unpublished manuscript, on the basis of a specimen 20 inches (51 cm) long, half of which consisted of the tail. Ray was unable to examine Robinson's manuscript, but suggested that Robinson's rat could not have been the brown rat, because that species did not reach the Americas until about 1800, and may instead have been O. antillarum.

Gosse had collected the British Museum specimen of Oryzomys antillarum in 1845, but may not have separated it from introduced rats found with it. Coues noted that the two USNM specimens he examined were received after he had written the preceding part of his monograph; later, Thomas and others wrote that these specimens were obtained around 1877, but Ray asserted that they were taken before 1874. No specimens have been collected since.

=== Extinction ===
Oryzomys antillarum probably became extinct about the 1870s and is currently listed as such by the IUCN Red List. Its disappearance is usually attributed to the small Indian mongoose (Urva auropunctata), which was introduced to Jamaica in 1872, and also to introduced Rattus species. Ray, on the other hand, argued that the significance of the mongoose had been overrated. Instead, he suggested that O. antillarum may have been affected by the massive environmental changes that occurred on the island after the British takeover in 1655. In that period, the bulk of the island came to be used for cultivation, so that the native habitat of Oryzomys was destroyed. Thus, Oryzomys was reduced to competition with introduced rats in man-made habitats, to which the latter are well adapted. Perhaps, Ray wrote, the black rat may not have been able to extirpate Oryzomys, but the brown rat, a later and more assertive invader, brought it to extinction. Cats and dogs preying on Oryzomys may also have contributed to its demise.

== See also ==
- List of extinct animals

== Literature cited ==
- Allen, G. M. (1942). "Extinct and vanishing mammals of the Western Hemisphere with the marine species of all the oceans". American Committee for International Wildlife Protection, Special Publications. 11: 1–620. doi:10.5962/bhl.title.25799.
- Anthony, H. E. (1920). "A zoologist in Jamaica". Natural History. 20: 157–168.
- Browne, P. (1756). The Civil and Natural History of Jamaica. In Three Parts. London. doi:10.5962/bhl.title.10826.
- Carleton, M. D.; Arroyo-Cabrales, J. (2009). "Review of the Oryzomys couesi complex (Rodentia: Cricetidae: Sigmodontinae) in Western Mexico". Bulletin of the American Museum of Natural History. 331: 94–127. doi:10.1206/582-3.1. S2CID 42256389.
- Coues, E. (1877). "Muridae". In Coues, E.; Allen, J. A. (eds.). Monographs of North American Rodentia. Report of the United States Geological Survey of the Territories. pp. i–264.
- Fincham, A.; Draper, G.; MacPhee, R. (2000). Jamaica Underground: The Caves, Sinkholes and Underground Rivers of the Island (2nd ed.). University of the West Indies Press. ISBN 978-976-640-036-1.
- Goldman, E. A. (1918). "The rice rats of North America". North American Fauna. 43: 1–101. doi:10.3996/nafa.43.0001 (inactive 1 July 2025). hdl:2027/uc1.31822033878554.
- Gosse, P. H. (1851). A naturalist's sojourn in Jamaica. London: Longman, Brown, Green, and Longmans.
- Hershkovitz, P. (1966). "Mice, land bridges, and Latin American faunal interchange". In Wenzel, R. L.; Tipton, V. J. (eds.). Ectoparasites of Panama. Vol. Fieldiana. Zoology. Special Publications. Chicago: Field Museum of Natural History. pp. 725–795.
- Honacki, J. H.; Kinman, K. E.; Koeppl, J. W., eds. (1982). Mammal Species of the World: A Taxonomic and Geographic Reference (1st ed.). Lawrence, Kansas: Allen Press, Inc., and The Association of Systematics Collections. ISBN 978-0-942924-00-8.
- Long, E. (1774). The History of Jamaica. Volume 3. London: printed for T. Lowndes.
- McFarlane, D. A.; Lundberg, J.; Fincham, A. G. (2002). "A late Quaternary paleoecological record from caves of southern Jamaica, West Indies" (PDF). Journal of Cave and Karst Studies. 64 (2): 117–125.
- Morgan, G. S. (1993). "Quaternary land vertebrates of Jamaica". In Wright, R. M.; Robinson, E. (eds.). Biostratigraphy of Jamaica. Geological Society of America Memoirs. Vol. 182. Geological Society of America. pp. 417–442. doi:10.1130/MEM182-p417. ISBN 0-8137-1182-7.
- Musser, G. G.; Carleton, M. D. (2005). "Superfamily Muroidea". In Wilson, D.E.; Reeder, D.M. (eds.). Mammal Species of the World: a taxonomic and geographic reference (3rd ed.). Baltimore: The Johns Hopkins University Press. pp. 894–1531. ISBN 978-0-8018-8221-0.
- Ray, C. E. (1962). The Oryzomyine Rodents of the Antillean Subregion (Doctor of Philosophy thesis). Harvard University.
- Thomas, O. (1898). "On indigenous Muridæ in the West Indies; with the description of a new Mexican Oryzomys". Annals and Magazine of Natural History. Series 7. 1 (2): 176–180. doi:10.1080/00222939808677948.
- Turvey, S. T.; Helgen, K. (2017). "Oryzomys antillarum". IUCN Red List of Threatened Species. 2017 e.T136540A22388029. doi:10.2305/IUCN.UK.2017-3.RLTS.T136540A22388029.en.
- Weksler, M.; Percequillo, A. R.; Voss, R. S. (2006). "Ten new genera of oryzomyine rodents (Cricetidae: Sigmodontinae)". American Museum Novitates (3537): 1–29. doi:10.1206/0003-0082(2006)3537[1:TNGOOR]2.0.CO;2. hdl:2246/5815. S2CID 84088556.
