= Oryzomys dimidiatus =

Conservation status
- Data Deficient (IUCN 3.1)

Scientific classification
- Kingdom: Animalia
- Phylum: Chordata
- Class: Mammalia
- Order: Rodentia
- Family: Cricetidae
- Subfamily: Sigmodontinae
- Genus: Oryzomys
- Species: O. dimidiatus

Binomial name
- Oryzomys dimidiatus (Thomas, 1905)
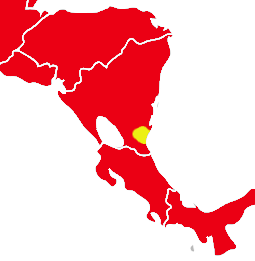
- Range of Oryzomys dimidiatus (yellow) and the related O. couesi (red and yellow) in Central America.

Synonyms
- Nectomys dimidiatus Thomas, 1905; [Oryzomys] dimidiatus: Hershkovitz, 1948

Nicaraguan rodent

Oryzomys dimidiatus, also known as the Nicaraguan oryzomys, Thomas's rice rat, or the Nicaraguan rice rat, is a rodent in the family Cricetidae. It is known from only three specimens, all collected in southeastern Nicaragua since 1904. Placed in Nectomys upon its discovery, it was later classified in its own subgenus of Oryzomys and finally recognized as closely related to other species now placed in Oryzomys, including the marsh rice rat and Coues' rice rat, which occurs in the same region.

With a head and body length of 110 to 128 mm (4.3 to 5.0 in), Oryzomys dimidiatus is a medium-sized rice rat. The upperparts are gray-brown and the underparts are grayish, not buffy as in O. couesi. The tail is only slightly darker above than below. All three specimens were caught near water and the species may be semiaquatic, spending some time in the water. Its conservation status is currently assessed as "Data Deficient".

== Taxonomy ==
The first known specimen was obtained by W.G. Palmer in 1904 and the next year, Oldfield Thomas of the British Museum of Natural History described this animal as the holotype of a new species he named Nectomys dimidiatus. He placed it in the genus Nectomys, commenting that it was much smaller than, but otherwise similar to previously known members of that genus. The species was listed as a Nectomys in taxonomic overviews in the next decades, including a 1944 review of the genus by Philip Hershkovitz.

After examining the holotype in London, Hershkovitz instead placed the species in the genus Oryzomys in 1948. He remarked that it was an especially distinctive member of that genus, and hence classified it in its own subgenus Micronectomys. J. Hernández-Camacho described a second species of Micronectomys, Oryzomys (Micronectomys) borreroi, from Colombia in 1957. In 1970, Hershkovitz treated O. dimidiatus in another publication and conceded that his name Micronectomys was a nomen nudum ("naked name") because he had not explicitly mentioned characters differentiating it from other taxa in his 1948 publication. Nevertheless, he did not do anything to rectify the situation, and Micronectomys remains a nomen nudum. Hershkovitz also noted that while O. dimidiatus resembles a juvenile Nectomys in external anatomy, it is otherwise similar to the marsh rice rat (Oryzomys palustris). He accepted O. borreroi as an Oryzomys, but did not think it closely related to O. dimidiatus. Six years later, Alfred Gardner and James Patton instead suggested O. borreroi was a Zygodontomys, and in his 1991 review of that genus Robert Voss confirmed that it is the same as Zygodontomys brunneus.

A second specimen was obtained in 1966 and the find was published in 1971 by Hugh Genoways and Knox Jones, who noted that the species is closely similar to O. palustris. Later workers affirmed the relationship between O. dimidiatus, O. palustris and associated species like O. couesi. Fiona Reid reported in 1997 that a third specimen had been found. In 2006, Marcelo Weksler and coworkers removed most of the species formerly placed in Oryzomys from the genus, because they are not closely related to the type species O. palustris, but kept O. dimidiatus as an Oryzomys.

Oryzomys dimidiatus is now recognized as one of eight species in the genus Oryzomys. O. dimidiatus is further part of the O. couesi section, which is centered on the widespread Central American O. couesi and also includes six other species with more limited and peripheral distributions. O. couesi occurs with O. dimidiatus in southeastern Nicaragua. Many aspects of the systematics of the O. couesi section remain unclear and it is likely that the current classification underestimates the true diversity of the group. Oryzomys is classified in the tribe Oryzomyini ("rice rats"), a diverse assemblage of American rodents of over a hundred species, and on higher taxonomic levels in the subfamily Sigmodontinae of family Cricetidae, along with hundreds of other species of mainly small rodents.

Oryzomys dimidiatus or "divided in the middle rice rat" derives respectively from the Greek oryza "rice", mys "mouse, rat", and the Latin dimidiatus "divided in the middle", from dimidio "halve, divide in two equal parts".

== Description ==
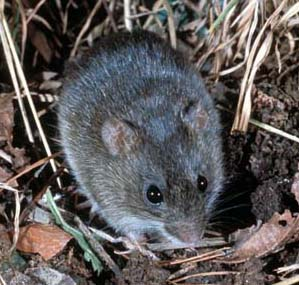
The marsh rice rat (Oryzomys palustris) is similar to O. dimidiatus.

Oryzomys dimidiatus is a medium-sized rice rat, smaller than O. couesi, with thick, lustrous fur and velvety underfur. The hairs on the back are about 6 mm in length. The upperparts are gray-brown with some dark hairs, appearing darker overall than in O. couesi; the color becomes more yellowish towards the sides. According to Thomas, a faint buff line extends from the sides to the inner sides of the hindlegs. The underparts are grayish, contrasting with the buffy underparts of O. couesi. The snout is short and the well-haired ears are partly hidden by the fur. The hands and feet are off-white or brownish above, not white as in O. couesi. The hindfeet show small interdigital webs, but they lack long tufts of hair on the digits and some of the pads are reduced or absent. The tail is about as long as the head and body and contains about 15 rings per centimeter. It is slightly darker (grayish) above than below (whitish), but the difference in color is much less pronounced than in O. couesi.

Compared to that of Nectomys, the skull is lightly built and has narrow nasals and a broad, round braincase without conspicuous ridges on it. The zygomatic plate is broad. The incisive foramina (perforations of the front part of the palate) extend between the first molars and are broadest in their back halves. The broad mesopterygoid fossa, the gap behind the end of the palate, is perforated by sphenopalatine vacuities. The molar crowns are not as simplified as in Nectomys species, but the front cusps of the upper (anterocone) and lower first molar (anteroconid) are not divided in two. In addition to the main roots, the upper and lower first molars have smaller additional roots.

Measurements for the first two known examples are as follows (in each case, the first measurement given is from the holotype, taken in 1904, the second, from the specimen taken in 1966): head and body length 125 and 118 mm (4.9 and 4.6 in), tail length 115 and 110 mm (4.5 and 4.3 in), hindfoot length 27 and 28 mm (1.1 and 1.1 in), ear length 13 and 15 mm (0.51 and 0.59 in), skull length 29.8 and 29.0 mm (1.17 and 1.14 in). The 1966 specimen weighed 46.0 g (1.62 oz) and had testes 11 mm (0.43 in) long; these measurements were not recorded in the 1904 specimen. Reid, who mentioned the third specimen, reported a maximum head and body length of 128 mm (5.0 in), tail length of 150 mm (5.9 in), hindfoot length of 31 mm (1.2 in), and ear length of 19 mm (0.75 in).

== Distribution, ecology, and behavior ==
Oryzomys dimidiatus is known from three specimens collected in the lowlands of the South Caribbean Coast Autonomous Region in southeastern Nicaragua. The first, an old male, was collected on November 5, 1904, in a banana plantation with very moist red clay on the Río Escondido near El Rama. The second, a young adult male, was caught on July 26, 1966, in dense cane on the south bank of the Río Mico at El Recreo, 15 km (9 mi) west from the location of the first specimen, along with three other rice rats (O. couesi, Melanomys caliginosus, and Oligoryzomys fulvescens), the cotton rat Sigmodon hirsutus, and the cottontail rabbit Sylvilagus brasiliensis. The third was caught at a stream near Bluefields. Reid suggested that the species is semiaquatic, spending some time in the water, like other Oryzomys.

The 2019 IUCN Red List assessed the conservation status of Oryzomys dimidiatus as "Data Deficient", noting that very little is currently known about the species.

== Literature cited ==
- Carleton, M.D.; Arroyo-Cabrales, J. (2009). "Review of the Oryzomys couesi Complex (Rodentia: Cricetidae: Sigmodontinae) in Western Mexico". Bulletin of the American Museum of Natural History. 331: 94–127. doi:10.1206/582-3.1. S2CID 42256389.
- Duff, A.; Lawson, A. (2004). Mammals of the World: A checklist. New Haven, Connecticut: Yale University Press. ISBN 0-7136-6021-X.
- Genoways, H.H.; Jones, J.K. (1971). "Second Specimen of Oryzomys dimidiatus". Journal of Mammalogy. 52 (4): 833–834. doi:10.2307/1378937. JSTOR 1378937.
- Hershkovitz, P. (1944). "A systematic review of the Neotropical water rats of the genus Nectomys (Cricetinae)". Miscellaneous Publications, Museum of Zoology, University of Michigan. 58: 1–88. hdl:2027.42/56303.
- Hershkovitz, P. (1948). "Mammals of Northern Colombia, Preliminary Report No. 3: Water Rats (Genus Nectomys), with Supplemental Notes on Related Forms". Proceedings of the United States National Museum. 98 (3221): 49–56. doi:10.5479/si.00963801.3221.49.
- Hershkovitz, P. (1970). "Supplementary Notes on Neotropical Oryzomys Dimidiatus and Oryzomys Hammondi (Cricetinae)". Journal of Mammalogy. 51 (4): 789–794. doi:10.2307/1378303. JSTOR 1378303.
- Jones, J.K.; Engstrom, M.D. (1986). "Synopsis of the rice rats (genus Oryzomys) of Nicaragua". Occasional Papers of the Museum of Texas Tech University. 103: 1–23. doi:10.5962/bhl.title.156590. hdl:2346/108061.
- Musser, G.G.; Carleton, M.D. (2005). "Superfamily Muroidea". In Wilson, D.E.; Reeder, D.M. (eds.). Mammal Species of the World: a taxonomic and geographic reference (3rd ed.). Baltimore: The Johns Hopkins University Press. pp. 894–1531. ISBN 978-0-8018-8221-0.
- Reid, F. (1997). A Field Guide to the Mammals of Central America and Southeast Mexico (1st ed.). Oxford University Press US. ISBN 978-0-19-506401-8.
- Reid, F. (2009). A Field Guide to the Mammals of Central America and Southeast Mexico (2nd ed.). Oxford University Press US. ISBN 978-0-19-534322-9.
- Sánchez H., J.; Ochoa G., J.; Voss, R.S. (2001). "Rediscovery of Oryzomys gorgasi (Rodentia: Muridae). With Notes on Taxonomy and Natural History". Mammalia. 65 (2): 205–214. doi:10.1515/mamm.2001.65.2.205. S2CID 85316706.
- Thomas, Oldfield (1905). "LXXX – New Neotropical Molossus, Conepatus, Nectomys, Proechimys, and Agouti, with a Note on the Genus Mesomys". Annals and Magazine of Natural History. 15 (90): 584–591. doi:10.1080/03745480509442857.
- Timm, R.; Reid, F. (2019). "Oryzomys dimidiatus". IUCN Red List of Threatened Species. 2019 e.T15594A22387864. doi:10.2305/IUCN.UK.2019-1.RLTS.T15594A22387864.en.
- Voss, R.S. (1991). "An introduction to the neotropical muroid rodent genus Zygodontomys". Bulletin of the American Museum of Natural History. 210: 1–113. hdl:2246/905.
- Weksler, M.; Percequillo, A.R.; Voss, R.S. (2006). "Ten New Genera of Oryzomyine Rodents (Cricetidae: Sigmodontinae)". American Museum Novitates (3537): 1–29. doi:10.1206/0003-0082(2006)3537[1:tngoor]2.0.co;2. hdl:2246/5815. S2CID 84088556.
