= ?Oryzomys pliocaenicus =

?Oryzomys pliocaenicus Temporal range: Hemphillian

Scientific classification (unresolved)
- Kingdom: Animalia
- Phylum: Chordata
- Class: Mammalia
- Order: Rodentia
- Family: Cricetidae
- Subfamily: Sigmodontinae
- Genus: Oryzomys (?)
- Species: †O. pliocaenicus

Binomial name
- †Oryzomys pliocaenicus Hibbard, 1939

Synonyms
- †? Bensonomys pliocaenicus; †? Jacobsomys pliocaenicus

Extinct species of rodent

?Oryzomys pliocaenicus is a fossil rodent from the Hemphillian (late Miocene) of Kansas, central United States. It is known from a single mandible (lower jaw) with the back part missing. All three molars are present, but very worn. Together, the molars are 3.6 mm long. The fossil was discovered in 1935 and described in 1939 as a possible species of Oryzomys (in open nomenclature). Later authors doubted this allocation and suggested that it may instead belong in Bensonomys or Jacobsomys, but the material may not allow a definite identification.

== Discovery and context ==
The only known specimen of ?Oryzomys pliocaenicus is a mandible (lower jaw) found in the spring of 1935 by David Dunkle in Edson Quarry, Sherman County, Kansas. It is in the collections of the Museum of Comparative Zoology at Harvard University as specimen MCZ 6202. Edson Quarry is in the Ogallala Formation and the Hemphillian North American Land Mammal Age. Claude W. Hibbard described the mandible as ?Oryzomys pliocaenicus in a 1939 paper. Hibbard wrote that the fauna was middle Pliocene, but it is now considered Miocene. The Edson Quarry fauna contains a diversity of other fossils, including mammals, birds, reptiles, and amphibians.

== Description ==
?Oryzomys pliocaenicus is known from a single mandible with the incisor and three molars in it. Much of the back of the jaw is missing, including the angular, condyloid, and coronoid processes. The mental foramen, a foramen (opening) at the front of the jaw, in the diastema between the incisor and molars, opens upwards, a little more so than in the living marsh rice rat (Oryzomys palustris). The masseteric ridges, which anchor some of the chewing muscles and are located on the outer surface of the mandible, are similar to those of Oryzomys. The molars are very worn, so that only traces of the cusps remain; no accessory small cusps are visible. Each of the teeth has two roots. The length of the toothrow is 3.6 mm and the depth of the mandible below the first molar is also 3.6 mm.

== Interpretations ==
Hibbard wrote that the condition of the mental foramen and masseteric ridges excluded the specimen from Onychomys, Peromyscus, Reithrodontomys, and Eligmodontia and that in these features and in its depth and size, the fossil more closely resembled Oryzomys; therefore, he placed it in that genus with a query. Oryzomys is a living genus that has occurred in the United States since at least 300,000 years ago. In 1966, Philip Hershkovitz wrote that Hibbard had reconsidered his opinion after re-examining ?O. pliocaenicus in 1952; he no longer thought that it was an Oryzomys and instead believed it may be a Bensonomys. The latter genus occurs in the late Miocene and early Pliocene of North America and has been variously interpreted as a close relative of the South American Calomys or merely as an evolutionarily convergent member of the North American subfamily Neotominae. Jon Baskin mentioned the animal in 1978 and 1986, asserting that it cannot be identified to genus level, but may be Bensonomys. Although some continue to list it under Oryzomys, it is now usually excluded from the genus. In 2008, Everett Lindsay listed ?O. pliocaenicus as a questionable species of Jacobsomys, a Pliocene North American genus which he said may be ancestral to Oryzomys.
