= Incorrect subsequent spelling =

In zoological nomenclature, an incorrect subsequent spelling is a name whose spelling has been unjustifiably and unintentionally changed from the original. It is distinct from a "mandatory change", a change to the original spelling that is required by the International Code of Zoological Nomenclature, and an "emendation", an intentional change to a name that may or may not be justified. (Note: Article 33)

For example, the rice rat Oryzomys peninsulae has occasionally been called "Oryzomys peninsularis", an incorrect subsequent spelling.

If an incorrect subsequent spelling is in "prevailing usage", it is to be conserved. For example, although the name of the pathogen Trypanosoma brucei was originally spelled brucii, the spelling brucei is in general use and should be maintained. (Note: Article 33.3.1)
