= Wormian bones =

Extra bone pieces that can grow within a suture in the skull

Wormian bones (Sutural bones)
- Wormian bones compared to a normal skull

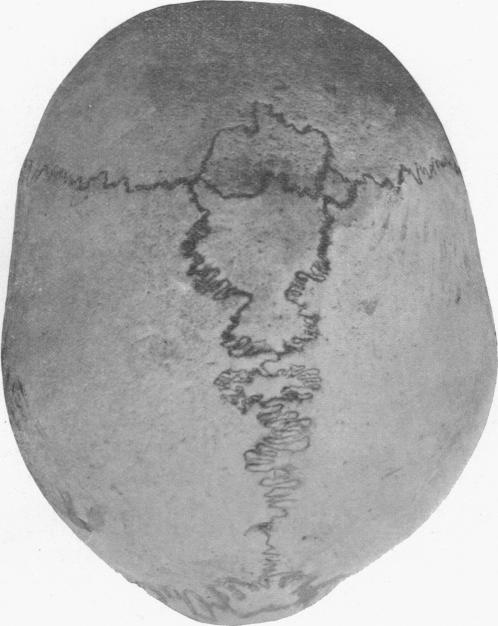
- Skull of a 21-year-old man with Wormian bones

Details

Identifiers
- Latin: ossa suturale
- TA98: A02.1.00.043
- TA2: 831
- FMA: 59327

Wormian bones, also known as intrasutural bones, sutural bones, or accessory bones of the skull, are extra bone pieces that can occur within a suture (joint) in the skull. These are irregular isolated bones that can appear in addition to the usual centres of ossification of the skull and, although unusual, are not rare. They occur most frequently in the course of the lambdoid suture, which is more tortuous than other sutures. They are also occasionally seen within the sagittal and coronal sutures. A large Wormian bone at lambda is often called an Inca bone (os incae), due to the relatively high frequency of occurrence in Peruvian mummies. Another specific Wormian bone, the pterion ossicle, sometimes exists between the sphenoidal angle of the parietal bone and the great wing of the sphenoid bone. They tend to vary in size and can be found on either side of the skull. Usually, not more than several are found in a single individual, but more than one hundred have been once found in the skull of a hydrocephalic adult.

Wormian bones are a marker for some diseases and important in the primary diagnosis of brittle bone disease: osteogenesis imperfecta.

Wormian bones may also be seen in:

- Pycnodysostosis
- Osteogenesis imperfecta
- Rickets
- "Kinky-hair" Menke's syndrome
- Cleidocranial dysostosis
- Hypothyroidism and hypophosphatasia
- Otopalatodigital syndrome
- Primary acro-osteolysis
- Down syndrome

== Derivation of the name ==
Wormian bones are named for Ole Worm, professor of anatomy at Copenhagen, 1588–1654. He taught Latin, Greek, physics and medicine. His description of the extra-sutural bones contributed to the science of embryology.

== In other animals ==
Wormian bones have been documented to occur in nonhuman mammals representing diverse groups, including Marsupialia, Xenarthra, Eulipotyphla, Artiodactyla (including Cetacea), Carnivora, Pholidota, Rodentia, Lagomorpha, and Primates.

== Additional image ==
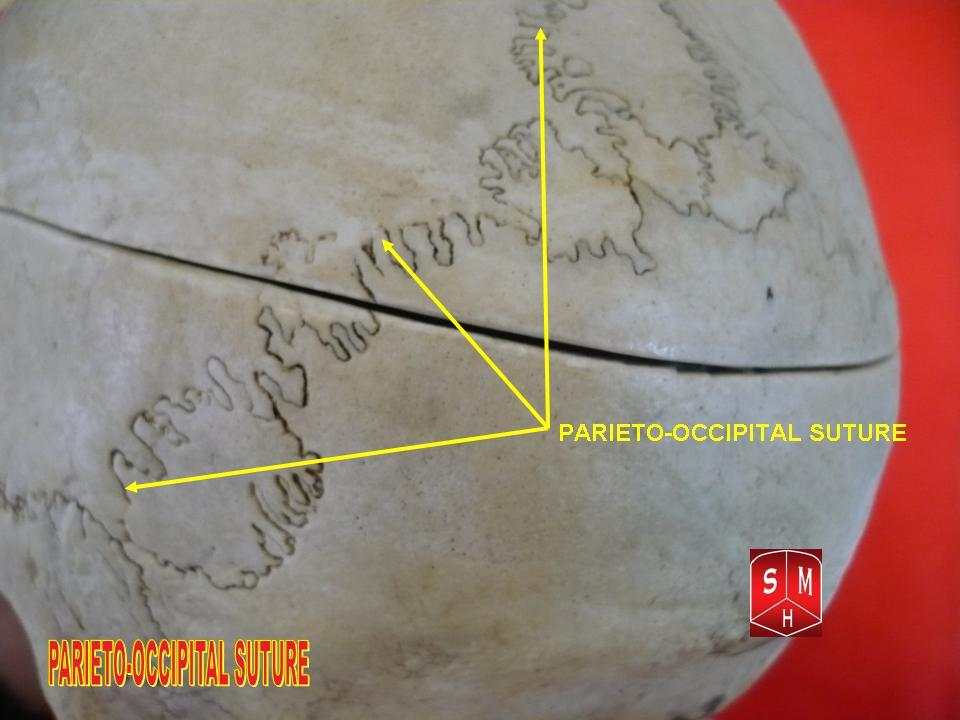
Wormian bones at lambdoid suture

== See also ==
- Human skull
