= Emendation (zoology) =

Change of scientific name

In zoological nomenclature, emendations are intentional alterations made to the spelling of taxon names. In bacteriological nomenclature, emendations are made to the circumscription of a taxon.

All emendations are considered by default to be available names. An emendation may be "justified" (when the original spelling is demonstrably incorrect under the International Code of Zoological Nomenclature, Article 32.5), or it may be "unjustified" (if the change violates the rules of the Code). (Note: Article 33.2.3) A justified emendation is different from a "mandatory change" only in that the latter is required by the Code, under Article 34. (Note: Article 34) An unjustified emendation is different from an "incorrect subsequent spelling" in that the latter is an unintentional change, while an emendation is explicitly intentional, and in that an incorrect subsequent spelling is not automatically considered to be an available name. (Note: Article 33.3)

== Definition and circumscription in the Code ==
Under Article 33.2, any "demonstrably intentional change in the original spelling of a name" other than a mandatory change is considered an emendation. (Note: Article 33.2)

Under Article 33.2.1, the change must be made along with justification for altering the spelling, with both the original and the new spelling cited together. (Note: Article 33.2.1)

Under Article 33.2.2, if the justification provided complies with the conditions given in Article 32.5 (which define when an original spelling should be considered "incorrect"), then the emendation is defined as "justified". A justified emendation changes the spelling without changing the original attribution of authorship or date (the author of the emended spelling is not included in the attribution in any way). (Note: Article 33.2.2)

Under Article 33.2.3, any change that does not comply with Article 32.5 is unjustified. An unjustified emendation has its own authorship or date (the author of the original spelling is not included in the attribution in any way). (Note: Article 33.2.3)

Under Article 33.2.3.1, if an unjustified emendation has erroneously been treated as if it had been justified, and used as the valid spelling of a taxon name by the majority of authors, then it is reclassified as a justified emendation and treated as such in perpetuity. (Note: Article 33.2.3.1)

== Examples ==
- correcting a typographical error in the original work is a justified emendation; e.g., a name published as "lashmirensis" where the author states the name is after Kashmir, where the species was discovered, can be justifiably emended to kashmirensis.
- correcting a name that includes diacritics or hyphens is a justified emendation; e.g., a name published as "d'urvillei" can be justifiably emended to durvillei.
- correcting an error in transliteration or latinization from non-Latin scripts is an unjustified emendation, as errors in scholarship are not considered to be correctable under Article 32.5; e.g., a species named "leonys" for its resemblance to a lion cannot be justifiably emended to leonis, even though the latter is proper Latin and the former is not.
- correcting the endings of species to match the gender of the generic name when the combination has been changed are mandatory changes as defined under Article 34, and not emendations.
- a name that was unjustifiably emended, such as the genus published originally by Fabricius in 1775 as "Elophorus" but emended to "Helophorus" by Illiger in 1801, has been spelled "Helophorus" almost universally since 1801, so it is now considered to be a justified emendation; the genus name is Helophorus, with Fabricius, 1775, credited as its author.
