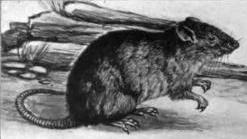
- Drawing of Oryzomys molestus, a synonym of Oryzomys albiventer.

Scientific classification
- Domain: Eukaryota
- Kingdom: Animalia
- Phylum: Chordata
- Class: Mammalia
- Order: Rodentia
- Family: Cricetidae
- Subfamily: Sigmodontinae
- Genus: Oryzomys
- Species: O. albiventer

Binomial name
- Oryzomys albiventer Merriam, 1901
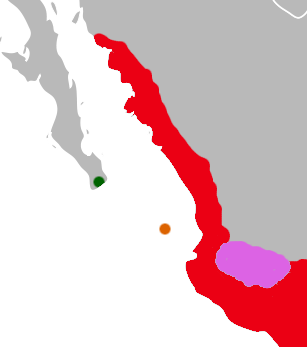
- Distribution of Oryzomys albiventer (in pink) and other western Mexican Oryzomys.

Synonyms
- Oryzomys albiventer Merriam, 1901; Oryzomys molestus Eliot, 1903; Oryzomys couesi albiventer: Goldman, 1918; Oryzomys palustris albiventer: Hall, 1960

= Oryzomys albiventer =

Species of rodent

Oryzomys albiventer, commonly known as the White-bellied Rice Rat, is a rodent in the genus Oryzomys of family Cricetidae from interior western Mexico, in the states of Jalisco, Guanajuato, and Michoacán. First described in 1901 as a separate species, it was later lumped under O. couesi and the marsh rice rat (O. palustris) until it was reinstated as a species in 2009. It differs from neighboring Oryzomys populations in size and measurements and is a large, brightly colored species with a long tail and robust skull and molars. Its range has been much impacted by agricultural development, but isolated populations are thought to persist.

== Taxonomy ==
Oryzomys albiventer was first described by C.H. Merriam in 1901 on the basis of ten specimens from Ameca, Jalisco. He named the animal albiventer after the white color of its underparts and considered it most closely related to Oryzomys aquaticus (currently included in Oryzomys couesi). Two years later, D.G. Eliot described Oryzomys molestus on the basis of a single individual from Ocotlán, Jalisco; the name molestus means "troublesome, irksome". Eliot considered Oryzomys fulgens, another current synonym of O. couesi, as the closest relative of his new species. In his 1918 review of North American Oryzomys, E.A. Goldman assessed the holotype of O. molestus, an old male, as merely a large example of albiventer, and reduced albiventer to one of many subspecies of O. couesi. He considered it closely related to three other highland Mexican forms. In 1960, E.R. Hall argued that O. couesi was the same species as the marsh rice rat (O. palustris) of the United States, and listed albiventer as a subspecies of the latter. Later, O. couesi was again accepted as separate from the marsh rice rat, but O. albiventer was still classified under O. couesi.

In a 2009 revision of the Oryzomys of western Mexico, M.D. Carleton and J. Arroyo-Cabrales noted substantial differences in coloration and measurements between highland populations (albiventer) and lowland populations (mexicanus) in Jalisco. On the basis of these differences, they recognized O. albiventer as a species separate from the lowland populations, which they classified under O. couesi. They confirmed that Eliot's molestus was based on a large example of O. abiventer, but left the status of the three forms Goldman had associated with albiventer—crinitus, aztecus, and regillus—open, noting that there was no convincing evidence that these represented the same species as O. albiventer. The identity and exact provenance of fulgens (supposed to be from the Valley of Mexico), and consequently its relationship to O. albiventer, remain unknown.

O. albiventer is part of the genus Oryzomys, which currently includes about eight species distributed from the eastern United States (O. palustris) into northwestern South America (O. gorgasi). O. albiventer is further part of the O. couesi section, which is centered on the widespread Central American O. couesi and also includes various other species with more limited and peripheral distributions. Many aspects of the systematics of the O. couesi section remain unclear and it is likely that the current classification underestimates the true diversity of the group. Oryzomys previously included many other species, which were progressively removed in various studies culminating in a contribution by Marcelo Weksler and coworkers in 2006 that removed more than forty species from the genus. All are classified in the tribe Oryzomyini ("rice rats"), a diverse assemblage of American rodents of over a hundred species, and on higher taxonomic levels in the subfamily Sigmodontinae of family Cricetidae, along with hundreds of other species of mainly small rodents.

In 1904, Eliot used the common name "white-bellied rice rat" for O. albiventer and "Ocotlan rice rat" for O. molestus. In 1918, Goldman also used "white-bellied rice rat" for O. albiventer.

== Description ==
Oryzomys albiventer is a large and long-tailed Oryzomys. The upperparts are brightly ochraceous, becoming grayer toward the front. The hairs on the underparts are pale gray near the bases and white in the outer half, so that the underparts appear pale grayish according to Carleton and Arroyo-Cabrales (not white as claimed by Merriman). The tail is dark above and light below. The skull and molars are relatively robust. O. albiventer has broad zygomatic arches (cheekbones), long incisive foramina (perforations of the palate between the incisors and the molars), and long nasal bones that extend behind the premaxillary bones. Compared to its lowland relative O. couesi mexicanus, O. albiventer is larger and more brightly colored and has larger molars but narrower incisive foramina.

In twelve specimens, total length is 245 to 314 mm (9.6 to 12.4 in), averaging 285.4 mm (11.24 in); head and body length is 116 to 142 mm (4.6 to 5.6 in), averaging 130.0 mm (5.12 in); tail length is 129 to 173 mm (5.1 to 6.8 in), averaging 155.4 mm (6.12 in); hindfoot length is 33 to 40 mm (1.3 to 1.6 in), averaging 36.1 mm (1.42 in); and skull length (occipitonasal length) is 30.0 to 34.5 mm (1.18 to 1.36 in), averaging 32.9 mm (1.30 in).

== Distribution and conservation ==
O. albiventer occurs at about 1,200 to 1,800 m (3,900 to 5,900 ft) elevation in northern Michoacán, southern Guanajuato, and central and eastern Jalisco, mostly in the area around Lake Chapala. Its range has seen massive agricultural development and although populations may survive, the current distribution of the species is certainly highly fragmented. More survey work is needed to assess the distribution and status of O. albiventer.

== Literature cited ==
- Carleton, M.D. and Arroyo-Cabrales, J. 2009. Review of the Oryzomys couesi complex (Rodentia: Cricetidae: Sigmodontinae) in western Mexico. Bulletin of the American Museum of Natural History 331:94–127.
- Eliot, D.G. 1903. A list of a collection of Mexican mammals with descriptions of some apparently new forms. Field Columbian Museum, Zoological Series 3(8):141–149.
- Eliot, D.G. 1904. The land and sea mammals of Middle America and the West Indies. Field Columbian Museum, Zoölogical Series 4(1):i–xxi, 1–439.
- Goldman, E.A. 1918. The rice rats of North America. North American Fauna 43:1–100.
- Hall, E.R. 1960. Oryzomys couesi only subspecifically different from the marsh rice rat, Oryzomys palustris (subscription required). The Southwestern Naturalist 5(3):171–173.
- Merriam, C.H. 1901. Synopsis of the rice rats (genus Oryzomys) of the United States and Mexico. Proceedings of the Washington Academy of Sciences 3:273–295.
- Musser, G.G. and Carleton, M.D. 2005. Superfamily Muroidea. Pp. 894–1531 in Wilson, D.E. and Reeder, D.M. (eds.). Mammal Species of the World: a taxonomic and geographic reference. 3rd ed. Baltimore: The Johns Hopkins University Press, 2 vols., 2142 pp. ISBN 978-0-8018-8221-0
- Weksler, M. 2006. Phylogenetic relationships of oryzomyine rodents (Muroidea: Sigmodontinae): separate and combined analyses of morphological and molecular data. Bulletin of the American Museum of Natural History 296:1–149.
- Weksler, M., Percequillo, A.R. and Voss, R.S. 2006. Ten new genera of oryzomyine rodents (Cricetidae: Sigmodontinae). American Museum Novitates 3537:1–29.
