= Oryzomys gorgasi =

Conservation status
- Endangered (IUCN 3.1)

Scientific classification
- Kingdom: Animalia
- Phylum: Chordata
- Class: Mammalia
- Order: Rodentia
- Family: Cricetidae
- Subfamily: Sigmodontinae
- Genus: Oryzomys
- Species: O. gorgasi

Binomial name
- Oryzomys gorgasi Hershkovitz, 1971
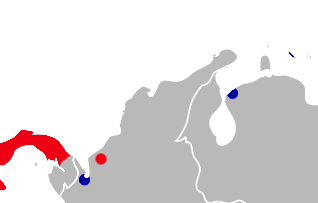
- Distribution of O. gorgasi (blue) and the related O. couesi (red) in northwestern South America.

Synonyms
- Oryzomys curasoae McFarlane and Debrot, 2001

Rodent from the family Cricetidae from northwestern Colombia and Venezuela

Oryzomys gorgasi, also known as Gorgas's oryzomys or Gorgas's rice rat, is a rodent in the genus Oryzomys of family Cricetidae. First recorded in 1967, it is known from only a few localities, including a freshwater swamp in the lowlands of northwestern Colombia and a mangrove islet in northwestern Venezuela. It reportedly formerly occurred on the island of Curaçao off northwestern Venezuela; this extinct population has been described as a separate species, O. curasoae, but does not differ morphologically from mainland populations.

O. gorgasi is a medium-sized, brownish species with large, semiaquatically specialized feet. It differs from other Oryzomys species in several features of its skull. Its diet includes crustaceans, insects, and plant material. The species is listed as "Endangered" by the International Union for Conservation of Nature as a result of destruction of its habitat and competition with the introduced black rat (Rattus rattus).

== Taxonomy ==
Oryzomys gorgasi was first found in Antioquia Department of northwestern Colombia in 1967 during an expedition by the U.S. Army Medical Department and the Gorgas Memorial Laboratory. In 1971, Field Museum zoologist Philip Hershkovitz described a new species, O. gorgasi, on the basis of the single known specimen, an old male. He named the animal after physician William Crawford Gorgas, the namesake of the Gorgas Memorial Laboratory. Hershkovitz considered the new species most closely related to Oryzomys palustris, which at the time included North and Central American populations now divided into several species, including the marsh rice rat (O. palustris) and O. couesi. The species was not recorded again until 2001, when Venezuelan zoologist J. Sánchez H. and coworkers reported on 11 specimens collected in coastal northwestern Venezuela in 1992, 700 km (430 mi) from the Colombian locality. They confirmed that O. gorgasi is a distinct species related to the O. palustris group.

In 2001, Donald McFarlane and Adolphe Debrot described a new Oryzomys species from the Dutch island of Curaçao off northwestern Venezuela. For their description, they used subfossil material from owl pellets, including two partial skulls and several hemimandibles. They referred the species to Oecomys, a group of arboreal (tree-living), mainly South American rodents related to Oryzomys. O. curasoae has also been known as the "Curaçao Rice Rat" and the "Curaçao Oryzomys".

Marcelo Weksler and colleagues removed most of the species then placed in Oryzomys from the genus in 2006, retaining only the marsh rice rat and related species, including O. gorgasi. They also kept O. curasoae in the genus and suggested that it may not be distinct from O. gorgasi. In a 2009 paper, R.S. Voss and Weksler examined the two and concluded that they represented the same species on the basis of direct comparisons and a phylogenetic analysis. The resultant tree placed O. curasoae and O. gorgasi sister to each other and closer to O. couesi than to the marsh rice rat. Accordingly, they placed O. curasoae as a junior synonym of the earlier described O. gorgasi.

Oryzomys gorgasi is the southeasternmost representative of the genus Oryzomys, which extends north into the eastern United States (marsh rice rat, O. palustris). O. gorgasi is further part of the O. couesi section, which is centered on the widespread Central American O. couesi and also includes six other species with more limited and peripheral distributions. Many aspects of the systematics of the O. couesi section remain unclear and it is likely that the current classification underestimates the true diversity of the group. Oryzomys is classified in the tribe Oryzomyini, a diverse assemblage of American rodents of over a hundred species, and on higher taxonomic levels in the subfamily Sigmodontinae of family Cricetidae, along with hundreds of other species of mainly small rodents.

== Description ==
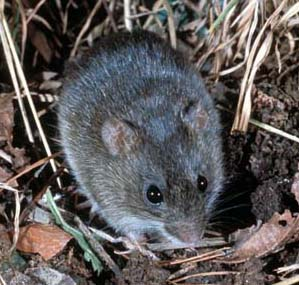
The marsh rice rat (O. palustris) is highly similar to O. gorgasi.

Oryzomys gorgasi is a medium-sized oryzomyine with small ears and large feet, and is similar to the marsh rice rat in general appearance. The long and coarse fur is brownish above and ochraceous below. At the base of the tail, the upper and lower sides differ in color and at the end is a short tuft of hairs. The scales on the tail are well-developed. As in other Oryzomys, the hindfeet exhibit specializations for life in the water. The plantar (lower) surface of the metatarsus is naked. Two of the pads are very small. Ungual tufts, tufts of hair at the bases of the claws, are poorly developed. Interdigital webbing is present, but extends along less than half of the first phalanges.

In specimens from El Caimito, total length is 220 to 290 mm (8.7 to 11.4 in), averaging 259 mm (10.2 in) (measured in 6 specimens); tail length is 116 to 138 mm (4.6 to 5.4 in), averaging 130 mm (5.1 in) (measured in 8 specimens); hindfoot length is 30 to 32 mm (1.2 to 1.3 in), averaging 31 mm (1.2 in) (measured in 10 specimens); ear length is 15 to 17 mm (0.59 to 0.67 in), averaging 16 mm (0.63 in) (measured in 7 specimens); and condylo-incisive length (a measure of total skull size) is 26.9 to 31.4 mm (1.06 to 1.24 in), averaging 29.6 mm (1.17 in) (measured in 5 specimens). In the holotype from Colombia, an old male, total length is 240 mm (9.4 in); tail length is 125 mm (4.9 in); ear length is 19 mm (0.75 in); and condylo-incisive length is 32.1 mm (1.26 in). The collector recorded the holotype's hindfoot as being 34 mm (1.3 in) long, but Sánchez and colleagues remeasured it as 33 mm (1.3 in).

The rostrum (front part of the skull) is short. The broad zygomatic plate develops a prominent notch, but not a spine, on its front end, and its back margin is in front of the first molars. The interorbital region, located between the eyes, is narrowest towards the front and is flanked by beadings along its margins. The interparietal bone is relatively long. The incisive foramina, perforations of the palate between the incisors and the molars, are narrow and long and taper towards the end. The palate itself is also long, extending beyond the molars, and includes prominent posterolateral palatal pits near the third molars, which are excavated into deep fossae. The roof of the mesopterygoid fossa, the opening behind the palate, is not perforated by sphenopalatine vacuities. O. gorgasi lacks an alisphenoid strut; in some other oryzomyines, this extension of the alisphenoid bone separates two openings in the skull, the masticatory–buccinator foramen and the foramen ovale accessorium. The squamosal bone lacks a suspensory process that contacts the tegmen tympani, the roof of the tympanic cavity, a defining character of oryzomyines. The subsquamosal fenestra, an opening at the back of the skull determined by the shape of the squamosal, is almost absent.

In the mandible (lower jaw), the upper and lower masseteric ridges come close together below the first molars, but do not fuse. The back end of the lower incisor root is in a capsular process, a raising of the mandibular bone behind the molars. The upper incisors have yellowish enamel and are opisthodont, with the cutting edge inclined backwards. The molars are relatively small and are brachydont (low-crowned) and bunodont (with the cusps higher than the connecting crests). They are similar to those of the marsh rice rat in structural details. The upper and lower first molars have small accessory roots, as in many other oryzomyines, and the second and third lower molar each have two roots only.

Oryzomys gorgasi is distinguished from other Oryzomys species by its short rostrum, the form of its incisive foramina, the absence of sphenopalatine vacuities, and the near absence of a subsquamosal fenestra. Within the species, the Colombian specimen differs from the Venezuelan animals in being larger in some measurements, but having smaller teeth, and in having oddly shaped wear facets of the incisors. The Colombian animal was probably kept in captivity for some time after it was caught, which would explain its large size and odd wear facets. There are no substantial differences between mainland O. gorgasi and material from Curaçao.

== Distribution and ecology ==
As far as known, Oryzomys gorgasi has a disjunct distribution in northwestern South America, including Colombia, Venezuela, and Curaçao. In a 2009 paper, Carleton and Arroyo-Cabrales speculated that its distribution may extend into Central America. The Colombian population is known from the holotype only, caught at Loma Teguerre (7°54'N, 77°W) in Antioquia Department, northwestern Colombia, near the Río Atrato, at about 1 m above sea level. The location is apparently a freshwater swamp, and Hershkovitz suggested that O. gorgasi probably occurred throughout the swamp forests in the Río Atrato basin. On Curaçao, it is known from cave faunas at Tafelberg Santa Barbara, Noordkant, Ser'i Kura, and Hermanus. At Tafelberg Santa Barbara, it was found in association with introduced black rats (Rattus rattus), indicating that the population persisted at least until the first European contact in 1499.

In Venezuela, it was found on El Caimito, a small (57 ha, 140 acres) islet just east of the outlet of Lake Maracaibo in the state of Zulia, where the only other native non-flying mammal is the opossum Marmosa robinsoni. El Caimito is separated from the mainland by a narrow, brackish channel and contains sand banks with xerophytic vegetation surrounded by marshy lagoons with Rhizospora mangle mangroves. Oryzomys gorgasi was caught in all habitats on the islet, but has not been found in other similar sites in northwestern Venezuela, where the introduced black rat is the only rodent collected. Analysis of stomach contents of El Caimito specimens indicates that the species is an omnivore, with a diet including crustaceans, insects, plant seeds, and other plant material. The crustaceans may include fiddler crabs (Uca) and a mangrove tree crab of the genus Aratus; the insects include flies (Diptera); and the plants include grass seeds. Two parasitic nematodes, Litomosoides sigmodontis (family Onchocercidae) and an undetermined species of Pterygodermatites (family Rictulariidae), are known to infect O. gorgasi. The 2009 IUCN Red List tersely indicates that the species has been found in a second Venezuelan locality.

== Conservation status ==
On the 2017 IUCN Red List, O. gorgasi is listed as "endangered" and O. curasoae as "data deficient". The species may be threatened by competition with introduced black rats and destruction of its habitat, but does occur in at least one protected area. Displacement by the black rat has caused the species to become locally extinct in parts of its Venezuelan range. Suitable habitats for O. gorgasi exist in inland Venezuela, and further study is needed to determine whether it is present there. The extinction of the Curaçao population may also have been caused by competition with the black rat, which has been found together with Oryzomys in subfossil deposits.

== Literature cited ==
- Carleton, M.D.; Arroyo-Cabrales, J. (2009). "Review of the Oryzomys couesi Complex (Rodentia: Cricetidae: Sigmodontinae) in Western Mexico" (PDF). Bulletin of the American Museum of Natural History. 331: 94–127. doi:10.1206/582-3.1. S2CID 42256389.
- Hershkovitz, P. (1971). "A New Rice Rat of the Oryzomys palustris Group (Cricetinae, Muridae) from Northwestern Colombia, with Remarks on Distribution". Journal of Mammalogy. 52 (4): 700–709. doi:10.2307/1378917. JSTOR 1378917.
- McFarlane, D.A.; Debrot, A.O. (2001). "A new species of extinct oryzomyine rodent from the Quaternary of Curaçao, Netherlands Antilles". Caribbean Journal of Science. 37 (3–4): 182–184. Archived from the original on July 16, 2011.
- Musser, G.G.; Carleton, M.D. (2005). "Superfamily Muroidea.". In Wilson, D.E.; Reeder, D.M. (eds.). Mammal Species of the World: a taxonomic and geographic reference (3rd ed.). Baltimore: The Johns Hopkins University Press. pp. 894–1531 [1148–1149]. ISBN 978-0-8018-8221-0.
- Sánchez H., J.; Ochoa G., J.; Voss, R.S. (2001). "Rediscovery of Oryzomys gorgasi (Rodentia: Muridae). With Notes on Taxonomy and Natural History". Mammalia. 65 (2): 205–214. doi:10.1515/mamm.2001.65.2.205. S2CID 85316706.
- Voss, R.S.; Weksler, M.W. (2009). "On the taxonomic status of Oryzomys curasoae McFarlane and Debrot, 2001, (Rodentia: Cricetidae: Sigmodontinae) with remarks on the phylogenetic relationships of O. gorgasi Hershkovitz, 1971". Caribbean Journal of Science. 45 (1): 73–79. doi:10.18475/cjos.v45i1.a11. S2CID 87520473.
- Weksler, M. (2006). "Phylogenetic Relationships of Oryzomine [sic] Rodents (Muroidea: Sigmodontinae): Separate and Combined Analyses of Morphological and Molecular Data". Bulletin of the American Museum of Natural History. 296: 1–149. doi:10.1206/0003-0090(2006)296[0001:PROORM]2.0.CO;2. S2CID 86057173.
- Weksler, M.; Percequillo, A.R.; Voss, R.S. (2006). "Ten New Genera of Oryzomyine Rodents (Cricetidae: Sigmodontinae)". American Museum Novitates (3537): 1–29. doi:10.1206/0003-0082(2006)3537[1:TNGOOR]2.0.CO;2. S2CID 84088556.
- Weksler, M.; Timm, R. (2018) [errata version of 2017 assessment]. "Oryzomys gorgasi". IUCN Red List of Threatened Species. 2017 e.T115554360A123796971. doi:10.2305/IUCN.UK.2017-3.RLTS.T115554360A22387922.en.
