= Sphenopalatine vacuities =

Perforations of the roof of the mesopterygoid fossa In rodents

In rodents, sphenopalatine vacuities are perforations of the roof of the mesopterygoid fossa, the open space behind the palate, in between the parapterygoid fossae. They may perforate the presphenoid or basisphenoid bone. Their development and form are variable between and within species, and features of the sphenopalatine vacuities have been used as characters in cladistic analyses.

Among Oryzomyini, a mainly South American group, a 2006 study distinguished three character states—large, wide vacuities, as among others in Oligoryzomys and Holochilus; small, narrow vacuities, as among others in Lundomys and Nephelomys; and no or vestigial vacuities, as among others in Mindomys and Oryzomys. Phyllotini all have very large sphenopalatine vacuities, as does Sigmodon. The vacuities in Reithrodon, formerly considered a phyllotine, are especially large. Nyctomys is special in having sphenopalatine vacuities restricted to the basisphenoid bone. Character polarity for the development of the vacuities in Cricetidae is difficult to determine, but their absence may be primitive in the Neotominae.

The development of sphenopalatine vacuities has also been used to distinguish among members of the Sciurini group of squirrels.

== Literature cited ==
- Carleton, M.D. 1980. Phylogenetic relationships in neotomine-peromyscine rodents (Muroidea) and a reappraisal of the dichotomy within New World Cricetinae. Miscellaneous Publications, Museum of Zoology, University of Michigan 157:i–vii+1–146.
- Moore, J.C. 1959. Relationships among the living squirrels of the Sciurinae. Bulletin of the American Museum of Natural History 118:157–206.
- Steppan, S.J. 1995. Revision of the tribe Phyllotini (Rodentia: Sigmodontinae), with a phylogenetic hypothesis for the Sigmodontinae. Fieldiana Zoology 80:1–112.
- Weksler, M. 2006. Phylogenetic relationships of oryzomyine rodents (Muroidea: Sigmodontinae): separate and combined analyses of morphological and molecular data. Bulletin of the American Museum of Natural History 296:1–149.
