= Subsquamosal fenestra =

Anatomical structure in rodents

In some rodents, the subsquamosal fenestra is an opening between two parts of the squamosal bone, at the back of the skull. It can be seen in lateral view. Most Oryzomyini have the fenestra, but some species, including those in the genera Nectomys, Sigmodontomys, and Melanomys among others, lack it.

== Literature cited ==
- Weksler, M. 2006. Phylogenetic relationships of oryzomyine rodents (Muroidea: Sigmodontinae): separate and combined analyses of morphological and molecular data. Bulletin of the American Museum of Natural History 296:1–149.
