= Interparietal bone =

Dermal bone situated between the parietal and supraoccipital

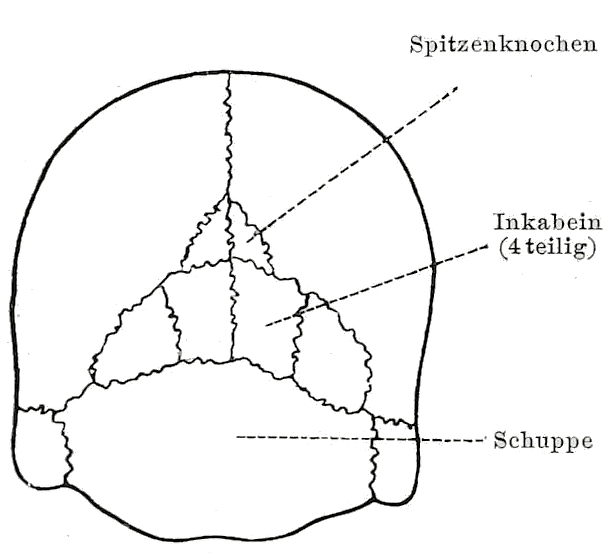
- Multiple interparietal bones or Inca bones shown in a 20th-century anatomical illustration (with labels in German).

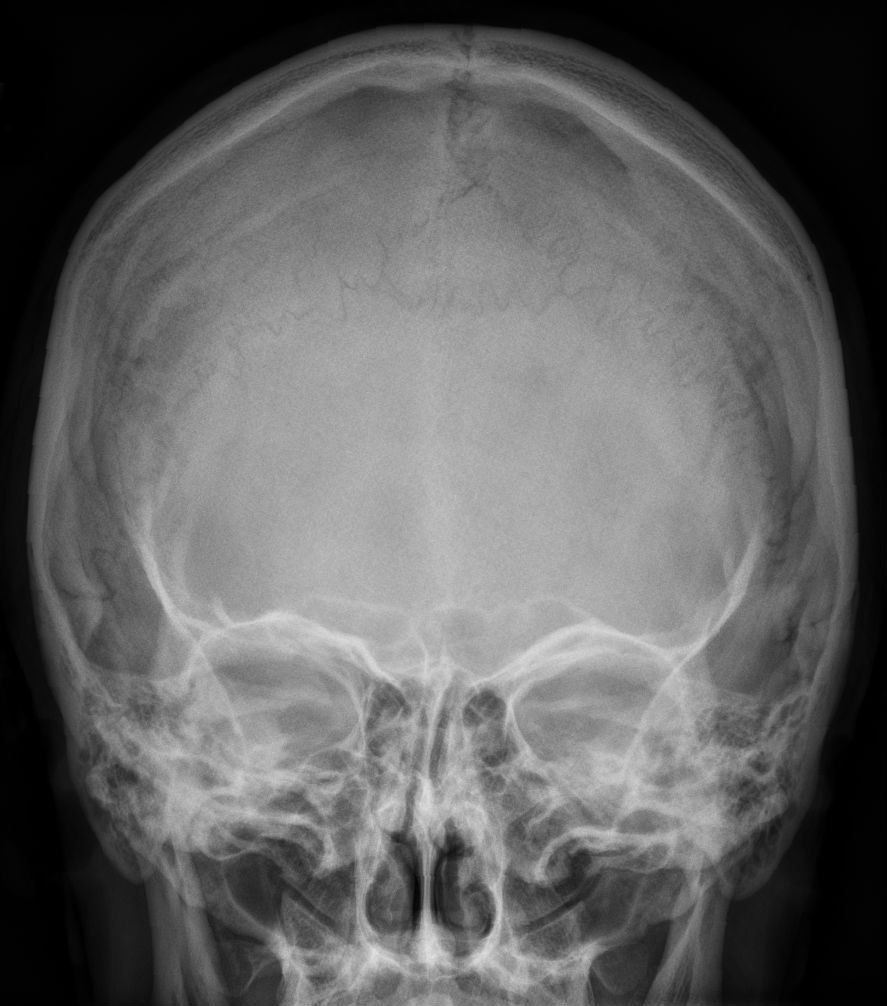
- Radiograph of the skull showing an interparietal bone between the occiput and parietal bones

Details

Identifiers
- Latin: os interparietale os inca
- TA98: A02.1.04.013
- TA2: 832
- FMA: 75748

The term interparietal bone (os interparietale or Inca bone or os inca var.) is used to refer to a number of dermal bones situated between the parietal and supraoccipital. In humans, the bone is present as a wormian bone arising within the sutures; it is not considered homologous with the interparietal of other animals.

== In humans ==
In humans, it corresponds to the upper portion of the squama of the occipital bone that lies superior to the highest nuchal line and is completely fused to the supraoccipital. However, in some individuals this portion remains separate from the rest of the occipital bone throughout life. In such cases, this separate bone is particularly referred as Inca bone. Inca bones in humans were first found in the skulls of contemporary indigenous peoples of the southern Andes as well as in those of mummies of the Inca civilization. Although the Inca bone was originally encountered as a variation in South American and Latin American cranial remains, the variation occurs in people from all geographic regions of the world and is by no means indicative of South/Latin American origin.

The existence of this Inca bone has helped to identify the mummified remains which spent 110 years in two German museums as belonging to a young South American woman who was probably a victim of ritual murder practiced around the 17th century.

== In other animals ==
In many other mammals, this bone is completely fused to the supraoccipital as in humans. However in some mammals (for example, rodents, rabbits, and artiodactyls), this bone remains separate from the supraoccipital bone. Classically, comparative anatomists have regarded the interparietal as being lost in various mammalian lineages since the interparietal and supraoccipital fuse with each other in the early ontogenetic period in many mammals, but a 2012 study has shown that its presence is confirmed in all extant mammalian orders, particularly in the embryonic period. The homology of the interparietal and its relation to other bones of the skull roof nevertheless remains enigmatic; specifically, in cetaceans, the identity of the posterior interparietals and the so-called "anterior middle interparietal" is the subject of debate.

== See also ==
- Wormian bones
