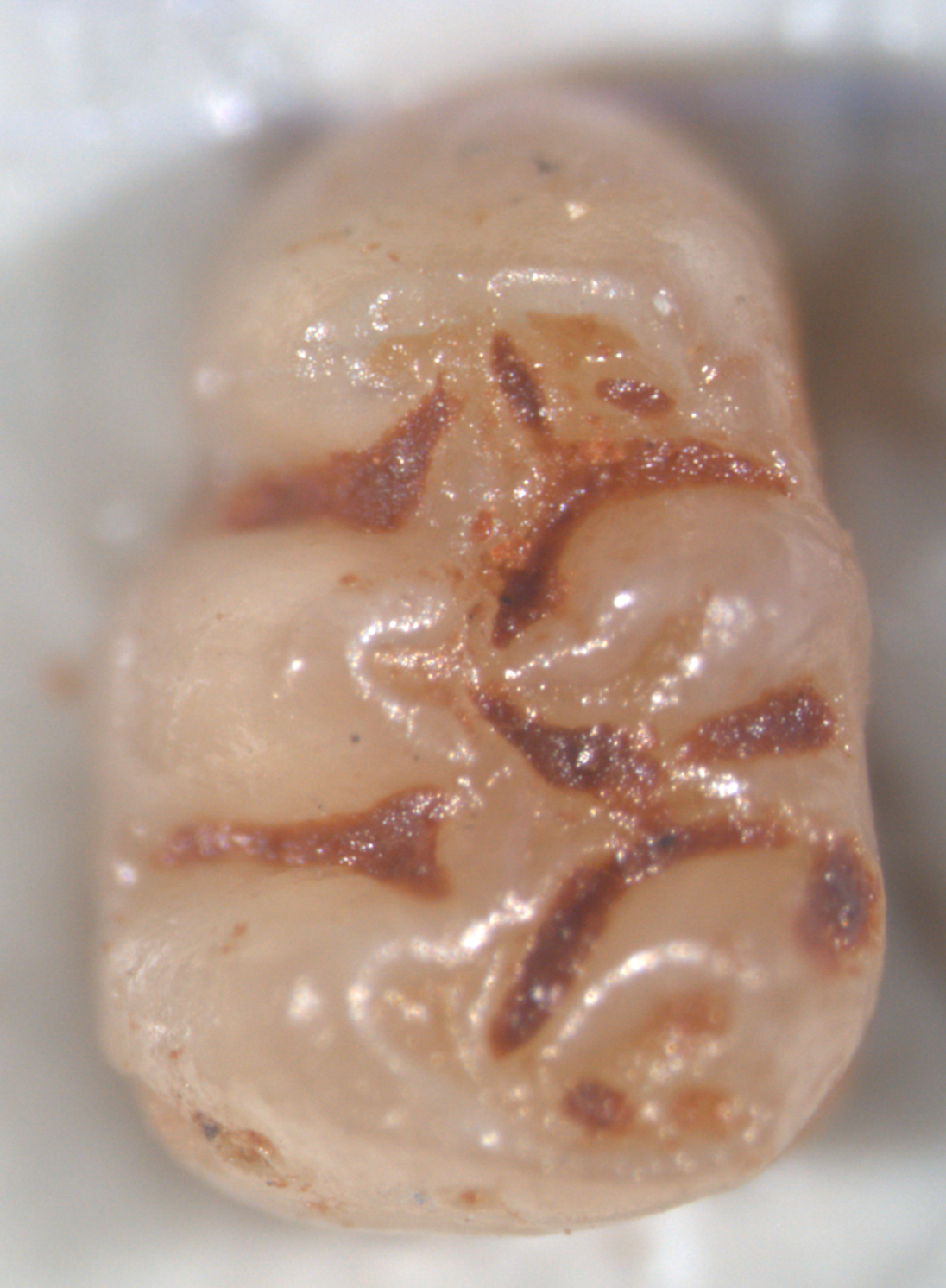
- Left first upper molar of Agathaeromys donovani

Scientific classification
- Kingdom: Animalia
- Phylum: Chordata
- Class: Mammalia
- Order: Rodentia
- Family: Cricetidae
- Subfamily: Sigmodontinae
- Tribe: Oryzomyini
- Genus: †Agathaeromys; Zijlstra, Madern, and Van den Hoek Ostende, 2010

Type species
- Agathaeromys donovani Zijlstra, Madern, and Van den Hoek Ostende, 2010

Species
- Agathaeromys donovani Zijlstra, Madern, and Van den Hoek Ostende, 2010; Agathaeromys praeuniversitatis Zijlstra, Madern, and Van den Hoek Ostende, 2010
- Location of the island of Bonaire, the only place where fossils of Agathaeromys have been found.

= Agathaeromys =

Agathaeromys Temporal range: Mid-Late Pleistocene (Ensenadan-Lujanian) ~0.9–0.23 Ma

Extinct genus of rodents

Agathaeromys is an extinct genus of oryzomyine rodents from the Pleistocene of Bonaire, Netherlands Antilles. Two species are known, which differ in size and some details of tooth morphology. The larger A. donovani, the type species, is known from hundreds of teeth that are probably 900,000 to 540,000 years old, found in four localities. A. praeuniversitatis, the smaller species, is known from 35 teeth found in a single fossil site, which is probably 540,000 to 230,000 years old.

Although material of Agathaeromys was first described in 1959, the genus was not formally named and diagnosed until 2010. It probably belongs to "clade D" within the oryzomyine group, together with many other island-dwelling species. The molars of both species possess several accessory crests in addition to the main cusps. In addition to some differences in features of the chewing surface of the molars, A. donovani has more roots on its lower molars than does A. praeuniversitatis.

== Etymology ==
The name Agathaeromys combines the Greek words ἀγαθός agathos "good", ἀήρ aêr "air", and μυς mys "mouse", referring to the name of the island of Bonaire and to the "fresh air" that contributions by Marcelo Weksler and colleagues brought to the classification of Oryzomyini. The name donovani honors Stephen Donovan for his contributions to the scientific knowledge of the Caribbean and praeuniversitatis refers to Leiden University's Pre-University College, which provided an opportunity for Zijlstra to participate in the project that led to the identification of Agathaeromys.

== Taxonomy ==
Material of Agathaeromys was first described by Dirk Hooijer in 1959 in the same paper that first named the extinct giant rat of Curaçao, Megalomys curazensis. Hooijer described a few fossil teeth and jaws from Fontein, Bonaire, as an indeterminate species of Thomasomys ("Thomasomys sp.") and considered them to be similar to species now placed in Delomys. In his 1974 monograph on the geology of the ABC islands (Aruba, Bonaire, and Curaçao—three Dutch islands off northwestern Venezuela), Paul Henri de Buisonjé listed Thomasomys sp. from additional fossil sites on Bonaire and additionally mentioned Oryzomys sp. from a different Bonaire site, Seroe Grandi. Although the Bonaire material represented one of the few fossil records of Thomasomys, it was only rarely mentioned in the literature.

In 2010, Jelle Zijlstra, Anneke Madern, and Lars van den Hoek Ostende reviewed the material. They considered it unlikely that the Bonaire "Thomasomys" would belong to the southern Brazilian genus Delomys or to Thomasomys, which occurs only in the mountains of the Andes. Using a cladistic analysis of the Sigmodontinae, they provided evidence that the Bonaire material belonged to the tribe Oryzomyini, rather than Thomasomyini (which includes Thomasomys). They carried out another cladistic analysis focused on Oryzomyini, which suggested that the Bonaire "Thomasomys" and the material from Seroe Grandi (De Buisonjé's "Oryzomys sp.") were closely related, but distinct from any recognized oryzomyine genus. Therefore, they named a new oryzomyine genus, Agathaeromys, with two species: Agathaeromys donovani (type species) for the material previously identified as Thomasomys; and Agathaeromys praeuniversitatis for the material from Seroe Grandi.

Although Zijlstra and colleagues could not precisely determine the position of Agathaeromys within Oryzomyini, their results suggest that it occupies a position near the base of "clade D", one of the major subgroups of Oryzomyini. This clade contains a number of species only occurring on islands—including members of Aegialomys, Agathaeromys, Megalomys, Nesoryzomys, Noronhomys, Oryzomys, and Pennatomys. Zijlstra and colleagues suggested that this is related to the high proportion of semiaquatic and non-forest species in clade D—most other oryzomyines are forest dwellers. However, subsequent phylogenetic studies based on variations of the same data set used by Zijlstra and colleagues did not corroborate this placement. In their 2012 description of Megalomys georginae, Turvey and colleagues recovered Agathaeromys outside each of the major groups of Oryzomyini. Zijlstra placed Agathaeromys within "clade C" in a clade with Oligoryzomys victus and an undescribed fossil species of Oligoryzomys from Aruba in his 2012 paper naming Dushimys.

As a whole, Oryzomyini includes over a hundred species in about thirty genera. Oryzomyini is one of several tribes within the subfamily Sigmodontinae of the family Cricetidae, which encompasses hundreds of other species of mainly small rodents, distributed chiefly in Eurasia and the Americas.

== Description ==
Agathaeromys is characterized mainly on the basis of features of the molar teeth. As usual in muroid rodents, there are three molars on both sides of the upper jaw (referred to as M1, M2, and M3 from front to back) and lower jaw (referred to as m1, m2, and m3). Agathaeromys is generally similar to other oryzomyines, but differs from other genera in a variety of details of the molar crowns. Agathaeromys donovani (M1 length 2.03–2.84 mm) is substantially larger than A. praeuniversitatis (M1 length 1.77–1.94 mm).

=== Upper dentition ===
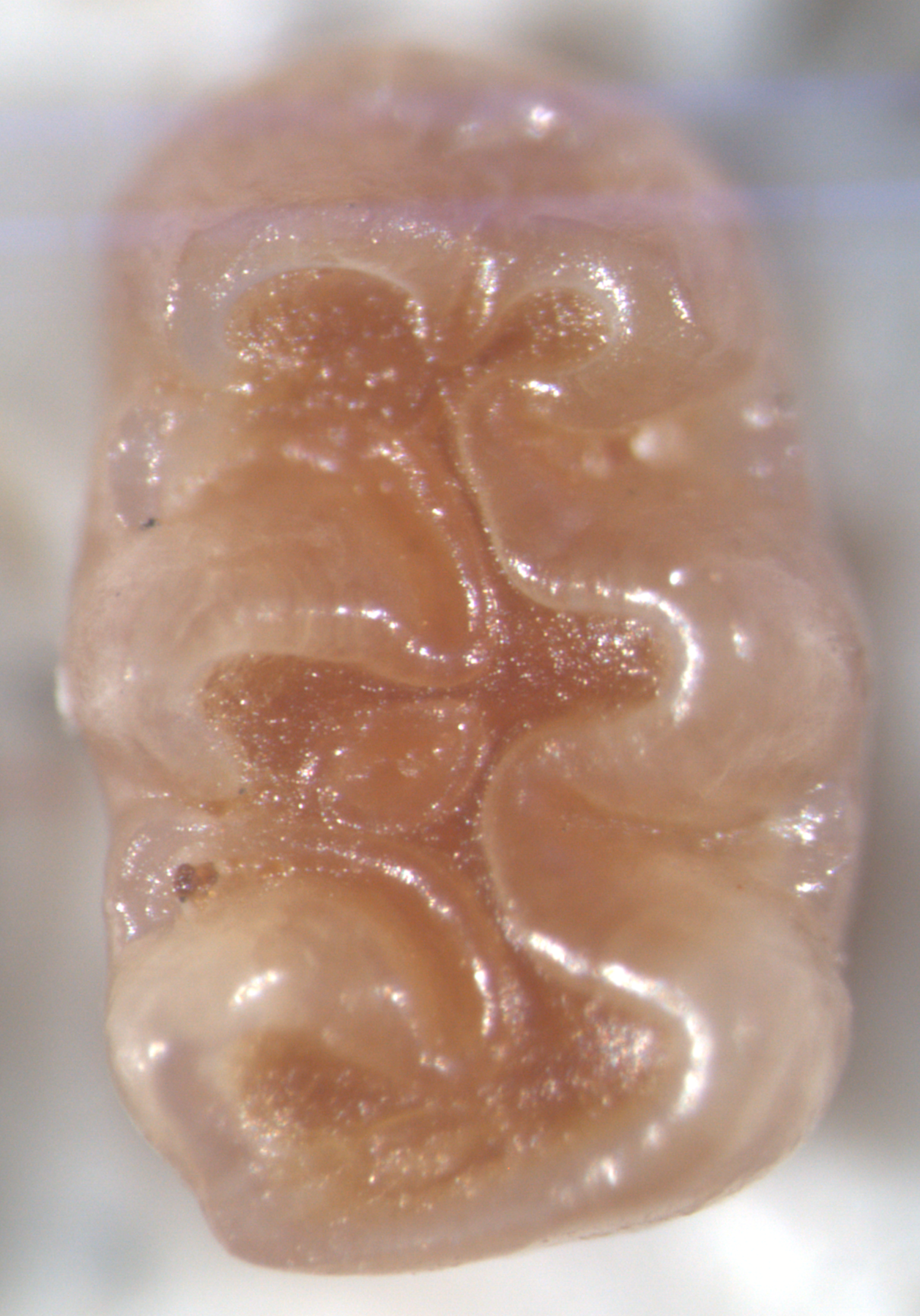
Right first upper molar of Agathaeromys praeuniversitatis

The cusp at the front of M1, the anterocone, is separated into two smaller cusps by an indentation. In A. donovani, a ridge generally connects the two cusps at the front margin of the tooth, so that the indentation separating them is closed at the front (an anteromedian fossette), but in A. praeuniversitatis, it is open toward the front (an anteromedian flexus). An additional crest, the anteroloph, is present behind the anterocone. Further to the back, there is a pair of cusps—the protocone at the lingual, or inner, side and the paracone at the labial, or outer, side. A crest issues from the paracone and is attached to the front or middle part of the protocone. Behind the paracone, the mesoloph crest is present; an additional crest usually connects the two. At the back of the tooth, there are two additional large cusps—the hypocone (lingual) and metacone (labial)—and a prominent crest, the posteroloph, issues from the hypocone and is located behind the metacone. In A. donovani, the metacone is generally connected to the posteroloph, but in A. praeuniversitatis, it is directly connected to the hypocone. The valleys that separate the cusps extend from the lingual and labial margins to about the midline of the molar. In addition to a large root at the front and two large roots at the back (one labial, one lingual) there is a small additional labial root.

There is no anterocone on M2, but a large anteroloph is present in front of the paracone. There is a protoflexus—an indentation in the crown in front of the protocone. As in M1, the paracone is connected to the front or middle of the protocone, the mesoloph is well-developed, and the valleys meet at the midline of the tooth. There are three roots: two at the labial and one at the lingual side.

M3 is a small, triangular tooth. There is a large basin in the middle, and a mesoloph is present. At the back of the tooth, there is a distinct posteroloph. In A. donovani, there are two roots at the front (labial and lingual) and one at the back. There are no M3 of A. praeuniversitatis with preserved roots.

=== Lower dentition ===
The anteroconid—the cusp at the front of m1—is usually divided in two by a central indentation (the anteromedian fossettid) in A. donovani, but this fossettid is absent in A. praeuniversitatis. Behind the anteroconid is the protoconid—metaconid pair of cusps. There is an anterolabial cingulum—a crest at the front labial margin, in front of the protoconid. There is a long crest behind the metaconid, a mesolophid. There is usually no corresponding crest (an ectolophid) behind the protoconid. Another pair of cusps—the hypoconid and the entoconid—is located at the back of the tooth. The entoconid, the lingual cusp of the two, is oriented forwards. There is always a large root at the front of the tooth and another at the back. A. donovani usually has a small labial root between the two large roots and often also another small root at the lingual side, but only one of four A. praeuniversitatis m1s even has the labial rootlet.

There is no anteroconid in m2 and the tooth lacks an additional crest (the anterolophid) in front of the metaconid, but there is an anterolabial cingulum in front of the protoconid. There is a mesolophid. In addition to a large root at the back, there are two roots at the front in A. donovani, which are sometimes partially fused, but only one in A. praeuniversitatis.

The anterolabial cingulum and anteroconid are both absent on m3. The mesolophid is usually absent. As in m2, there are two roots at the front in A. donovani and only one in A. praeuniversitatis, but the front roots are usually fused in A. donovani.

=== Jaws ===
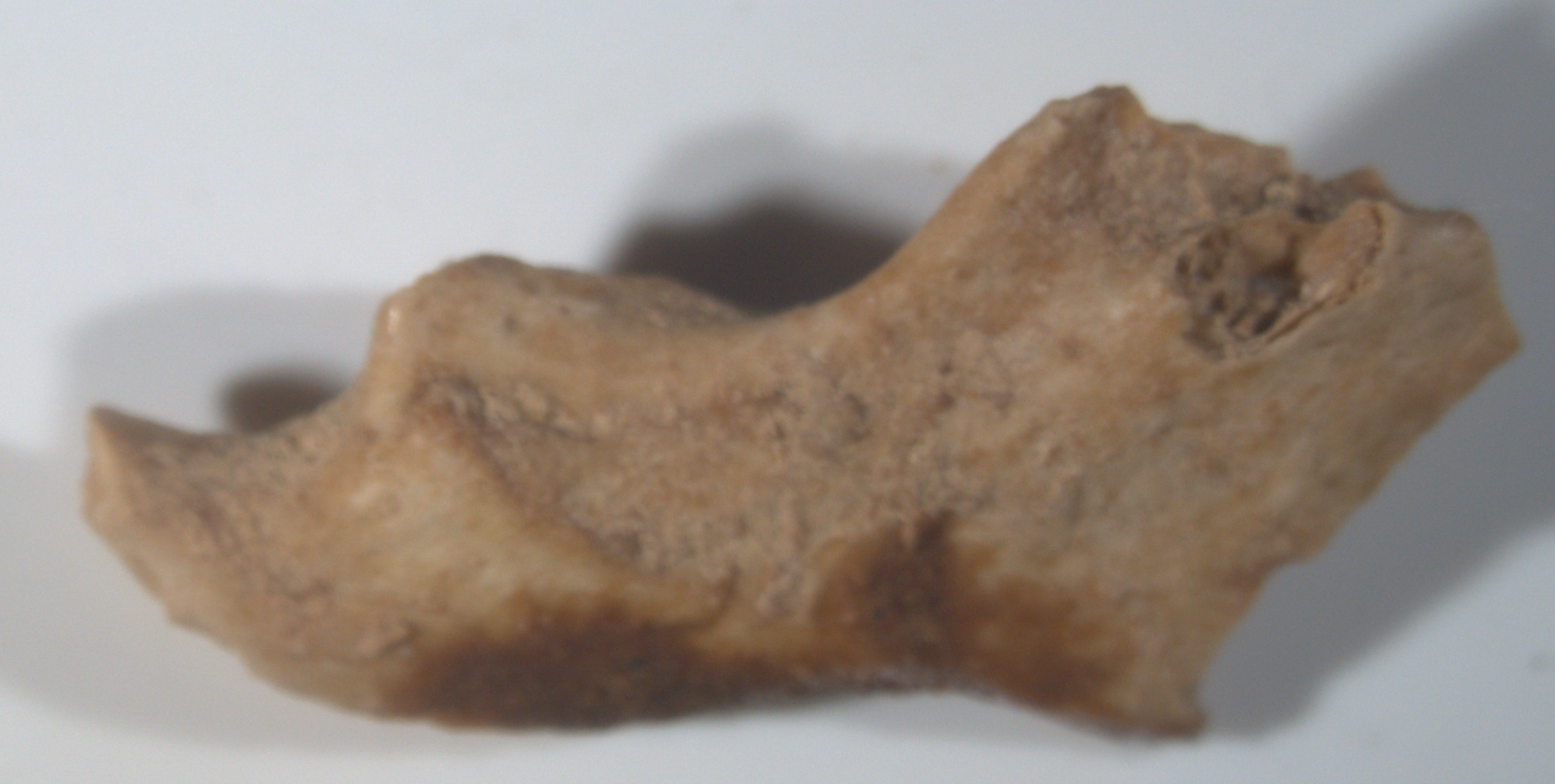
A left mandible (lower jaw) of Agathaeromys praeuniversitatis, seen from the outer side. All the teeth are missing.

The maxilla (upper jaw) is known only for A. donovani. In these fossils, the back margin of the incisive foramen (an opening in the palate) is about at the same level as the front of M1, and the back margin of the zygomatic plate (a bony plate at the side of the skull, connected to the zygomatic arch) is also close to the front of M1. Mandibles (lower jaws) of both species are known. The mental foramen (an opening in the front of the jaw bone) opens towards the labial side of the bone, except in one mandible of A. praeuniversitatis, in which its opening is located higher. There is a well-developed capsular process—a raising in the bone that houses the root of the lower incisor. The masseteric ridges (two ridges on the labial side of the bone that anchor some of the chewing muscles) are joined into a single crest towards the front and reach to a point below the front of m1.

A single mandible from Porto Spanjo (one of the sites where fossils of A. donovani have been found), without preserved molars, differs from all Agathaeromys dentaries and is thought to represent an unknown different sigmodontine rodent. This jaw is more slender than A. donovani dentaries, has a shorter diastema (gap) between the incisors and molars, have the incisor less shifted lingually relative to the molars, and has more roots under the molars, as shown by the preserved alveoli.

== Age and range ==
Agathaeromys donovani is known from four fossil sites—Fontein, Porto Spanjo, Barcadera-Karpata, and "80 m above sea level"—that have yielded 259, 148, 54, and 5 molars, respectively. Agathaeromys praeuniversitatis is known from 35 molars from a single site (Seroe Grandi). Although the deposits have not been precisely dated, Zijlstra and colleagues suggested on the basis of correlations with similar deposits on nearby Curaçao and sea-level fluctuations that the material of A. praeuniversitatis is likely 540,000 to 230,000 years old and that of A. donovani is likely 900,000 to 540,000 years old. Similarly aged fossil sites are also known from the nearby islands of Curaçao and Aruba, but these contain various other rodents, including Megalomys curazensis and Dushimys larsi on Curaçao and species of Oligoryzomys, Sigmodon, and Zygodontomys on Aruba. Agathaeromys probably descends from an unknown oryzomyine that migrated to the island from mainland Venezuela sometime during the Pleistocene.
