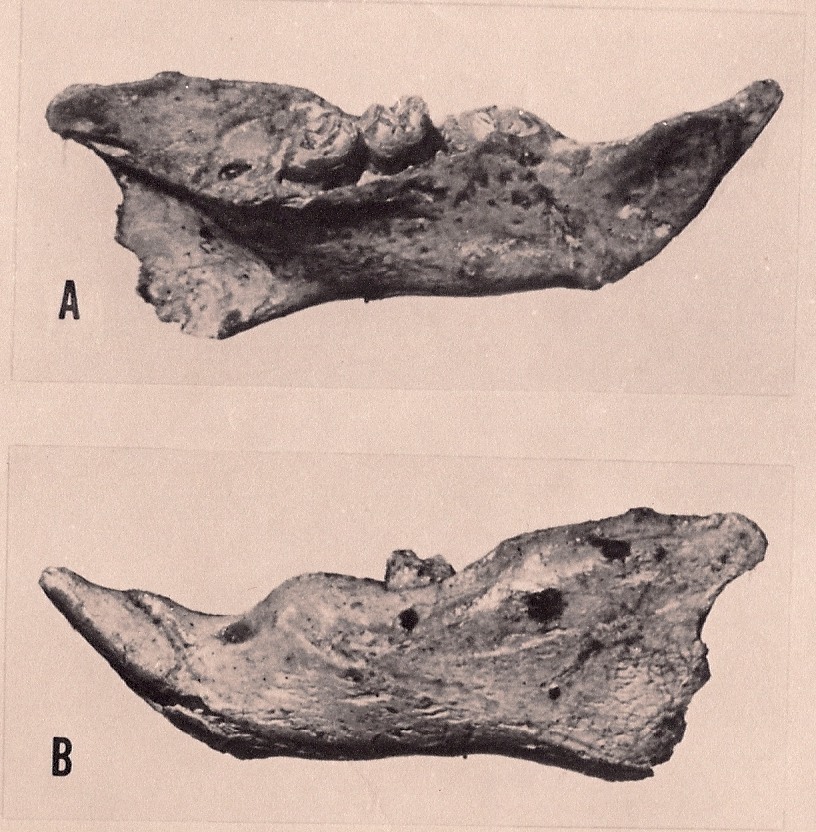
- Holotype mandible (lower jaw) of Megalomys audreyae, seen from the right (lingual view) above and from the left (labial view) below.

Scientific classification
- Kingdom: Animalia
- Phylum: Chordata
- Class: Mammalia
- Order: Rodentia
- Family: Cricetidae
- Subfamily: Sigmodontinae
- Genus: †Megalomys
- Species: †M. audreyae

Binomial name
- †Megalomys audreyae Hopwood, 1926

Synonyms
- Oryzomys (Megalomys) majori Trouessart, 1904 (nomen nudum); Megalomys audreyae Hopwood, 1926; Oryzomys (Megalomys) audreyae: Ray, 1962

= Megalomys audreyae =

Megalomys audreyae Temporal range: Quaternary

Extinct species of rodent

Megalomys audreyae, known as the Barbudan (?) muskrat or the Barbuda giant rice rat, is an extinct oryzomyine rodent from Barbuda in the Lesser Antilles. Described on the basis of a single mandible (lower jaw) with the first molar missing and an isolated upper incisor, both of uncertain but Quaternary age, it is one of the smaller members of the genus Megalomys. Little is known about the animal, and its provenance and distinction from "Ekbletomys hypenemus", an even larger extinct oryzomyine that also occurred on Barbuda, have been called into question. The toothrow in the lower jaw has a length of 8.7 mm at the alveoli. The third molar is relatively narrow and both the second and third molars have a wide valley between their outer cusps.

== History ==
Remains of Megalomys audreyae were found by John Walter Gregory among cave breccia on Barbuda around 1900. The exact locality is unknown. In his 1901 description of Oryzomys luciae, Charles Immanuel Forsyth Major mentioned the Barbuda animal as another member of the Megalomys group, but he never published a description of the latter. Édouard Louis Trouessart gave the name Oryzomys (Megalomys) majori to it in his Catalogus Mammalium, but he did not describe it and therefore the name is a nomen nudum. In 1926, Arthur Hopwood finally described it and named it Megalomys audreyae after Gregory's wife Audrey, following Major's intention.

The oryzomyines of the Caribbean were revised in 1962 by Clayton Ray, who examined the specimens Gregory had found and redescribed them. He suggested that M. audreyae may in fact have come from Barbados instead of similarly named Barbuda, citing the occurrence of a different oryzomyine ("Ekbletomys hypenemus") in other cave deposits on Barbuda, circumstantial evidence for the occurrence of a native rodent on Barbados, uncertainty whether Gregory ever visited Barbuda, and biogeographical considerations.

In the subsequent literature, M. audreyae has seldom been mentioned and never been further described. In a 1999 review of recent extinctions in mammals, Ross MacPhee and C. Flemming reported that M. audreyae had been recovered from a locality on Barbuda known as Darby Sink, which had been radiocarbon dated to around 1200 BCE. They also stated that M. audreyae and "Ekbletomys" may in fact be identical. However, in 2009 Samuel Turvey suggested that two different rice rats were in fact present in material from Barbuda, which would imply that M. audreyae is a valid species.

== Description ==
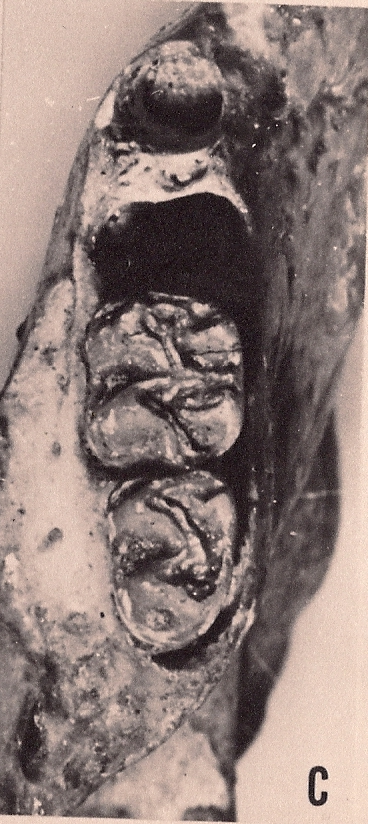
Lower toothrow in the mandible: second and third molar, with the first molar missing

The only remains of Megalomys audreyae that have been described in the literature are the original two specimens Gregory found, a left upper incisor and a left mandible (lower jaw). The upper incisor is not grooved and its diameter has a length of 2.6 mm and width of 1.5 mm, but exhibits no other significant characters.

The mandible, which is severely damaged and lacks the condyloid, coronoid, and angular processes at the back of the bone, contains the second and third molar and part of the lower incisor, but the first molar is missing. The capsular process of the lower incisor, a slight raising of the mandibular bone at the back end of the incisor, is small. The preserved alveoli, the impressions left by the roots, show that the first molar was supported by large roots at the front and back and a smaller root in between these. The second molar is about square and shows the four main cusps commonly present in rodents: the protoconid, metaconid, hypoconid, and entoconid. A strongly developed mesolophid (a crest) is also present, as in most oryzomyines. The main valley between the cusps, the hypoflexid, is broad and V-shaped. The third molar is as long as the second, but it is narrower and the entoconid is poorly developed. Again, the hypoflexid is broad and V-shaped. The length of the toothrow at the alveoli is 8.7 mm. The length of the second molar is 2.5 mm and the width is 2.2 mm. The third molar has a length of 2.5 mm and width of 1.8 mm.

When Clayton Ray described "Ekbletomys hypenemus" on the basis of abundant skeletal remains from both Barbuda and Antigua, he carefully distinguished it from M. audreyae, the only other native rodent recorded from those islands. M. audreyae is much smaller than "Ekbletomys"; for example, 72 specimens of the latter had the alveolar length of the lower molars ranging from 10.3 to 12.6 mm (mean 11.6 mm, standard deviation 0.49 mm; compare 8.7 mm for M. audreyae). In addition, the V-shaped hypoflexids and narrow third molar of M. audreyae contrast with the narrow, parallel-sided hypoflexids and broad third molar of "Ekbletomys". These characters, and others observable in species of Megalomys represented by more complete material, convinced Ray that M. audreyae and "Ekbletomys" are not only distinct species, but indeed share no close relationship. Instead, he proposed that the combination of large size, occurrence in the Lesser Antilles, and similarity in molar morphology indicated a relationship between M. audreyae and other species of Megalomys, and he suggested that the similarly sized M. curazensis from Curaçao, off Venezuela, may be most closely related to M. audreyae.
