= Informal name =

Informal name may refer to:

== Science ==
- Nomen nudum
- Unavailable name
- Common name
- An evolutionary grade or otherwise unnatural group without a valid scientific name.
