= Hummelinck's vesper mouse =

Conservation status
- Least Concern (IUCN 3.1)

Scientific classification
- Kingdom: Animalia
- Phylum: Chordata
- Class: Mammalia
- Order: Rodentia
- Family: Cricetidae
- Subfamily: Sigmodontinae
- Genus: Calomys
- Species: C. hummelincki

Binomial name
- Calomys hummelincki (Husson, 1960)

Species of rodent

Hummelinck's vesper mouse (Calomys hummelincki) is a species of rodent in the family Cricetidae. It is found in Aruba, Brazil, Colombia, the Netherlands Antilles, and Venezuela.
