= Available name =

Properly constructed taxonomic name

In zoological nomenclature, an available name is a scientific name for a taxon of animals that has been published after 1757 and conforming to all the mandatory provisions of the International Code of Zoological Nomenclature for the establishment of a zoological name. In contrast, an unavailable name is a name that does not conform to the rules of that code and that therefore is not available for use as a valid name for a taxon. Such a name does not fulfill the requirements in Articles 10 through 20 of the Code, or is excluded under Article 1.3.

== Requirements ==
For a name to be available, in addition to meeting certain criteria for publication, there are a number of general requirements it must fulfill: it must include a description or definition of the taxon, must use only the Latin alphabet, must be formulated within the binomial nomenclature framework, must be newly-proposed (not a redescription under the same name of a taxon previously made available) and originally used as a valid name rather than as a synonym, must not be for a hybrid or hypothetical taxon, must not be for a taxon below the rank of subspecies, etc. In some rare cases, a name which does not meet these requirements may nevertheless be available, for historical reasons, as the criteria for availability have become more stringent with successive Code editions. For example, a name originally appearing along with an illustration but no formal description may be an available name, but only if the illustration was published prior to 1930 (under Article 12.2.7).

All available names must refer to a type, even if one was not provided at the time the name was first proposed. For species-level names, the type is usually a single specimen (a holotype, lectotype, or neotype); for generic-level names, the type is a single species; for family-level names, the type is a single genus. This hierarchical system of typification provides a concrete empirical anchor for all zoological names.

An available name is not necessarily a valid name, because an available name may be a homonym or subsequently be placed into synonymy. However, a valid name must always be an available one.

== Unavailable names ==
Unavailable names include names that have not been published, such as "Oryzomys hypenemus" and "Ubirajara jubatus", names without an accompanying description (nomina nuda, singular nomen nudum), such as the subgeneric name Micronectomys proposed for the Nicaraguan rice rat, names proposed with a rank below that of subspecies (infrasubspecific names), such as Sorex isodon princeps montanus for a form of the taiga shrew, and various other categories.

Despite the frequent confusion caused by common sense, an unavailable name is not necessarily a nomen nudum. A good exemplification of this is the case of the unavailable dinosaur name "Ubirajara jubatus", which was assumed by common sense to be a nomen nudum before a detailed analysis of its nomenclatural status.

== Contrast to botany ==
Under the International Code of Nomenclature for algae, fungi, and plants, this term is not used. In botany, the corresponding term is validly published name. The botanical equivalent of zoology's term "valid name" is correct name.

== Bibliography ==
- Hershkovitz, P. 1970. Supplementary notes on Neotropical Oryzomys dimidiatus and Oryzomys hammondi (Cricetinae). Journal of Mammalogy 51(4): 789-794.
- Hutterer, R. & Zaitsev, M.V. 2004. Cases of homonymy in some Palaearctic and Nearctic taxa of the genus Sorex L. (Mammalia: Soricidae). Mammal Study 29:89-91.
- International Commission for Zoological Nomenclature. 1999. International Code of Zoological Nomenclature, 4th edition. London: The International Trust for Zoological Nomenclature. Available online at https://web.archive.org/web/20090524144249/http://www.iczn.org/iczn/index.jsp. Accessed September 27, 2009.
