= Megalomys georginae =

Megalomys georginae Temporal range: Late Pleistocene-Holocene

Scientific classification
- Kingdom: Animalia
- Phylum: Chordata
- Class: Mammalia
- Order: Rodentia
- Family: Cricetidae
- Subfamily: Sigmodontinae
- Genus: †Megalomys
- Species: †M. georginae

Binomial name
- †Megalomys georginae Turvey, Brace & Weksler, 2012

Extinct species of rodent

Megalomys georginae is an extinct species of rice rat from Barbados in the genus Megalomys. The species was extant during the Late Pleistocene, and became extinct shortly after European arrival in Barbados.
