= Pennatomys =

Conservation status
- Extinct (IUCN 3.1)

Scientific classification
- Kingdom: Animalia
- Phylum: Chordata
- Class: Mammalia
- Order: Rodentia
- Family: Cricetidae
- Subfamily: Sigmodontinae
- Tribe: Oryzomyini
- Genus: †Pennatomys; Turvey, Weksler, Morris, and Nokkert, 2010
- Species: †P. nivalis

Binomial name
- †Pennatomys nivalis Turvey, Weksler, Morris, and Nokkert, 2010
- Map of the northern Lesser Antilles indicating the three islands where Pennatomys has been found

Extinct oryzomyine rodent in the Lesser Antilles

Pennatomys nivalis is an extinct oryzomyine rodent from the islands of Sint Eustatius, Saint Kitts, and Nevis in the Lesser Antilles. The only species in the genus Pennatomys, it is known from skeletal remains found in Amerindian archeological sites on all three islands, with dates ranging from 790–520 BCE to 900–1200 CE. No live specimens are known, but there are several historical records of rodents from Saint Kitts and Nevis that could conceivably refer to Pennatomys. The animal apparently belongs to a group within the tribe Oryzomyini that includes many other island-dwelling species.

Pennatomys nivalis was a medium-sized rodent without many distinctive adaptations. The nasal bones were short and blunt-ended. The zygomatic plate, a bony plate at the side of the skull, was broad. The bony palate was long and flat. The root of the lower incisor was housed in a bony protuberance, the capsular process. The molars were low-crowned and possess accessory crests such as mesolophs. The upper molars all had three roots.

== Taxonomy ==
Oryzomyini, also known as rice rats, is a diverse grouping of North, Central, and South American rodents within the family Cricetidae. Remains of extinct rice rats are known throughout the Lesser Antilles, but the systematic relationships among those animals are poorly understood, and many species remain unnamed. Rice rat fossils were first recorded from Saint Kitts in 1907 by archeologist C.W. Branch and were later found in abundance in Amerindian archeological sites on nearby Nevis and Sint Eustatius. The rice rat of these islands was formally described and named as Pennatomys nivalis in a 2010 article by zoologist Samuel Turvey and coworkers. The generic name, Pennatomys, combines the Latin pennatus, "winged", with -mys, "mouse", a standard element in the names of rodent genera, and honors archeologist Elizabeth Wing. The specific name, nivalis, is Latin for "snowy" and refers to Nevis. This island's name derives from the Spanish Nuestra Señora de las Nieves ("Our Lady of the Snows"), a reference to the clouds (mistaken for snow) that surround the island's central peak.

Cladistic analysis of morphological characters suggest that Pennatomys is most closely related to a clade, the Nectomys subclade, that includes members of Aegialomys, Amphinectomys, Nectomys, Sigmodontomys, Melanomys, Megalomys (another Antillean rice rat), and possibly Nesoryzomys. However, the exact position of Pennatomys was poorly resolved because of missing data. Turvey and colleagues placed P. nivalis as the only member of its own genus because of its distinctive characters and the absence of evidence for close relationships with any other oryzomyine genus. Pennatomys probably belongs to a subgroup of Oryzomyini known as "clade D". This clade contains a number of species occurring only on islands – including members of Aegialomys, Megalomys, Nesoryzomys, Noronhomys, Oryzomys, and Pennatomys. Turvey and colleagues suggested that this is related to the high proportion of semiaquatic species in clade D – most other oryzomyines are forest dwellers. As a whole, Oryzomyini includes more than a hundred species in about thirty genera. It is one of several tribes within the subfamily Sigmodontinae of the family Cricetidae, which encompasses hundreds of other species of mainly small rodents, distributed chiefly in Eurasia and the Americas. However DNA analysis demonstrated a sister-taxa relationship with Megalomys as an endemic Lesser Antillean radiation within clade D, and also showed that the different island populations showed a high degree of genetic differentiation from each other.

== Description ==
A medium-sized oryzomyine, Pennatomys is known from a number of skeletal remains, many of which are fragmentary. Both skull and postcranial bones are represented. Although there are no unusual adaptations in the known material, the animal possesses a combination of characteristics that distinguish it from all other known oryzomyines. The skull is known only from fragments. The nasal bones extend back to a point before or slightly behind the point where the maxillary, frontal, and lacrimal bones meet, and have a blunt back margin. The nasals extend slightly further back than the premaxillaries. The lacrimals articulate with both the frontals and the maxillaries, a trait that distinguishes Pennatomys from its closest relatives (which have lacrimals articulating mainly with the frontals). The interorbital region of the skull bears weak crests at its sides. The zygomatic plate, a bony plate at the side of the skull, is broad and its back margin is located in front of the first upper molar (M1). The incisive foramina, openings in the bony palate, extend back to a point next to the front root of M1. The palate itself is long and flat, extending beyond the third upper molars (M3). In the mandible (lower jaw), there is a capsular process – a protuberance at the back of the jawbone that houses the root of the lower incisor. Below the molars, the upper and lower masseteric ridges (crests which support some of the chewing muscles) are sometimes conjoined towards the front, and they extend forward to a point below the first lower molar (m1). The conjoined crests are one of the synapomorphic (shared-derived) characters of the Nectomys subclade.

The maxillary toothrows are parallel to each other. The molars are bunodont (with the cusps higher than the connecting crests) and brachyodont (low-crowned) and have the inter-cusp valleys on the labial (outer) sides closed by a cingulum (shelf). The valleys on the labial and lingual (inner) sides of the molars meet at the midlines. Each of the upper molars has three roots – unlike in most of the closest relatives of Pennatomys, there is no additional labial root on M1. The m1 has four roots, two large roots at the front and back and two smaller ones in the middle. There are three roots under m2, two at the front and one at the back, and two under m3, at the front and back. Upper toothrow length ranges from 5.6 to 6.7 mm (0.22 to 0.26 in) and lower toothrow length is 5.9 to 7.4 mm (0.23 to 0.29 in).

On M1, the anterocone (the cusp at the front of the tooth) is not divided into smaller cuspules. The connection between the protocone and the paracone, the major cusps immediately after the anterocone, is located relatively far toward the front. Behind the paracone, the mesoloph accessory crest is present. On M2, there is no protoflexus (an indentation in front of the protocone, which on this tooth is the frontmost cusp) and the valley between the paracone and the mesoloph, the mesoflexus, is not divided into two pieces by a paracone–mesoloph connection. These traits are both characteristic of the Nectomys subclade. The mesoloph is present on M3, but the posteroloph, a crest at the back of the tooth, is absent or vestigial, as is the hypoflexus (the valley between the protocone and the cusp behind it, the hypocone). The absence or near-absence of the posteroloph is a distinctive trait that differentiates Pennatomys from related oryzomyines.

The anteroconid on m1 (the frontmost cusp, corresponding to the anterocone) contains an internal hollow, an anteromedian fossettid. There is an ectolophid, an accessory crest in the valley between the protoconid (the cusp on the labial side, behind the anteroconid) and the hypoconid (the cusp behind the protoconid, at the back labial corner of the tooth). On the other side of the tooth, the mesolophid (another accessory crest) is also present. On each of the lower molars, an anterolabial cingulum (a shelf on the front labial corner) is present. On m2 and m3, an anterolophid is present – a crest in front of the metaconid (the cusp on the front lingual corner of the tooth).

== Range and history ==
Remains of Pennatomys nivalis come from several Amerindian archeological sites on each of the three islands where it has been found; it was eaten by the native Amerindian population. The oldest site is Hickman's Shell Heap on Nevis, which is from the Archaic age and is dated to 790–520 BCE. The youngest, Sulphur Ghaut (900–1200 CE), is also on Nevis and is from the post-Saladoid period. Other sites on Nevis include Hickman's (Saladoid, 100 BCE to 600 CE), Indian Castle (post-Saladoid, 650–880 CE), and Coconut Walk (post-Saladoid, no absolute dates known). The only site on Sint Eustatius is the Saladoid and post-Saladoid site Golden Rock (80 BCE to 980 CE). Each of the three sites yielding Pennatomys on Saint Kitts is from the post-Saladoid period: Sugar Factory (700–1000 CE), Bloody Point (660–1115 CE), and Cayon (undated).

Unambiguous historical records of Pennatomys are lacking, but there are some references to Saint Kitts and Nevis rodents that may relate to it. George Percy reported on the presence of "great store of Conies" (Note: "Con(e)y" is an archaic word for "rabbit" which may also refer to other small mammals, like hyraxes, pikas, and guinea pigs.) on Nevis around 1606, probably a reference to the agoutis (Dasyprocta) that have been introduced throughout the Lesser Antilles. There are references from 1631 and 1720 to people eating rats on Saint Kitts and Nevis, respectively, but these may well have been introduced black rats (Rattus rattus), not Pennatomys. There are anecdotal records of unusual rats on Nevis up to recent times; these were reportedly eaten by the Islanders until the 1930s. Surveys on Nevis in 2009 found no evidence for the survival of Pennatomys. The extinction of the Antillean rice rats, including Pennatomys, may have resulted from the introduction of exotic animals such as the black rat and the small Asian mongoose (Urva auropunctata) to the Lesser Antilles.

There are no known morphological differences between the three island populations, but Turvey and colleagues found that animals from Nevis were slightly smaller than those from the two other islands. Such a difference in size might be related to the fact that Saint Kitts is larger than Nevis, in accordance with the trend that animals become larger on larger islands. However, Turvey and colleagues also observed that their Saint Kitts material consisted of older individuals than those from Nevis; thus, the size difference may result from differences in the mode of exploitation by Amerindians.

== Literature cited ==
- Brace, S.; Turvey, S. T.; Weksler, M.; Hoogland, M. L. P.; Barnes, I. (2015). "Unexpected evolutionary diversity in a recently extinct Caribbean mammal radiation". Proceedings of the Royal Society B: Biological Sciences. 282 (1807) 20142371. doi:10.1098/rspb.2014.2371. PMC 4424637. PMID 25904660.
- Branch, C.W. (1907). "Aboriginal antiquities in Saint Kitts and Nevis". American Anthropologist. 9 (2): 315–333. doi:10.1525/aa.1907.9.2.02a00060. JSTOR 659591.
- Musser, G.G.; Carleton, M.D. (2005). "Superfamily Muroidea". In Wilson, D.E.; Reeder, D.M. (eds.). Mammal Species of the World: a taxonomic and geographic reference (3rd ed.). Baltimore: The Johns Hopkins University Press. pp. 894–1531. ISBN 978-0-8018-8221-0.
- Turvey, S.T.; Collen, B. (2011). "Pennatomys nivalis". IUCN Red List of Threatened Species. 2011 e.T199838A9129524. IUCN. doi:10.2305/IUCN.UK.2011-2.RLTS.T199838A9129524.en.
- Turvey, S.T.; Weksler, M.; Morris, E.L.; Nokkert, M. (2010). "Taxonomy, phylogeny, and diversity of the extinct Lesser Antillean rice rats (Sigmodontinae: Oryzomyini), with description of a new genus and species". Zoological Journal of the Linnean Society. 160 (4): 748–772. doi:10.1111/j.1096-3642.2009.00628.x.
- Weksler, M (2006). "Phylogenetic relationships of oryzomyine rodents (Muroidea: Sigmodontinae): separate and combined analyses of morphological and molecular data". Bulletin of the American Museum of Natural History. 296: 1–149. doi:10.1206/0003-0090(2006)296[0001:proorm]2.0.co;2. hdl:2246/5777. S2CID 86057173.
- Weksler, M.; Percequillo, A.R.; Voss, R.S. (2006). "Ten new genera of oryzomyine rodents (Cricetidae: Sigmodontinae)". American Museum Novitates (3537): 1–29. doi:10.1206/0003-0082(2006)3537[1:tngoor]2.0.co;2. hdl:2246/5815. S2CID 84088556.
