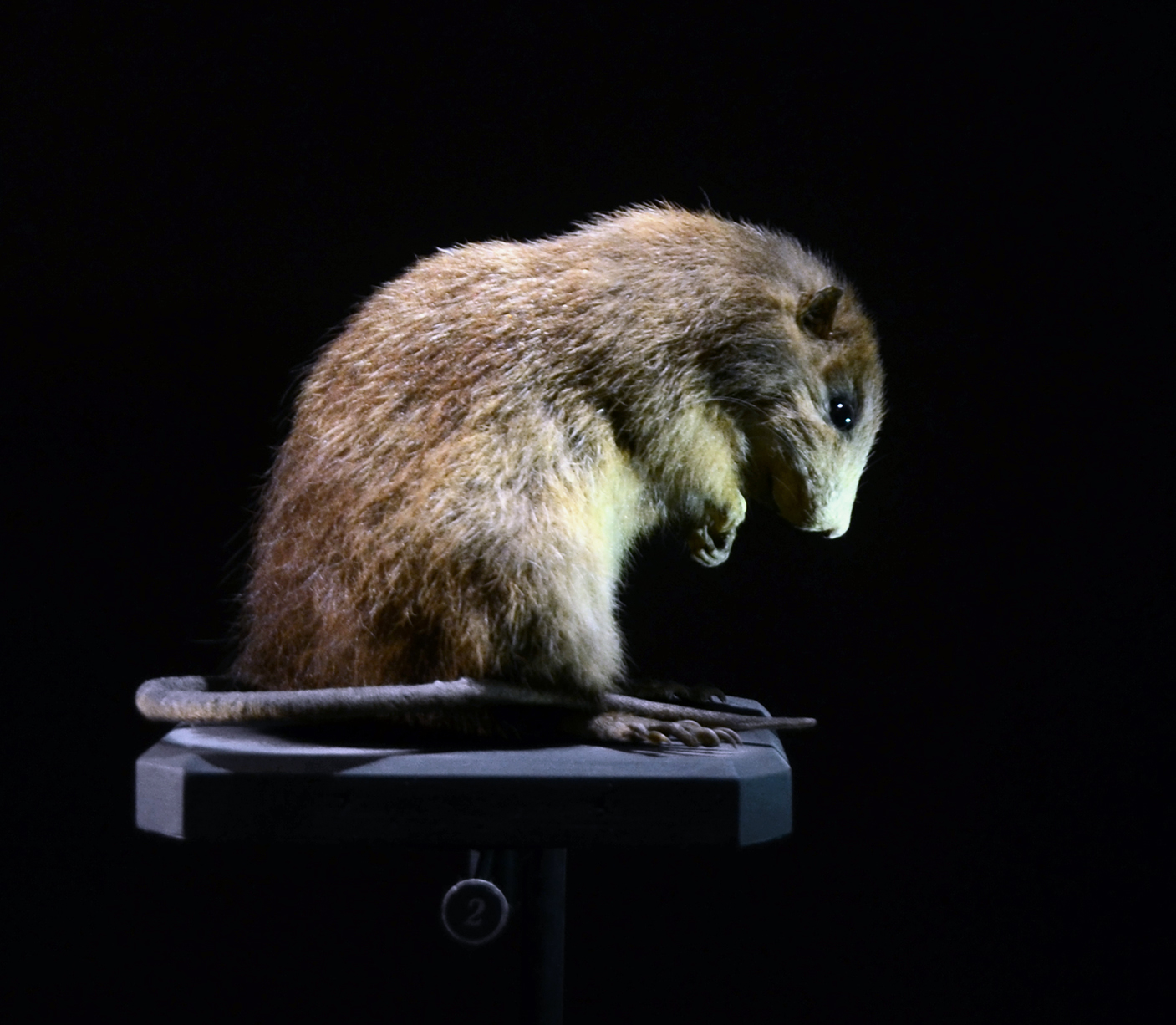
- Stuffed specimen

Conservation status
- Extinct (1881) (IUCN 3.1)

Scientific classification
- Kingdom: Animalia
- Phylum: Chordata
- Class: Mammalia
- Order: Rodentia
- Family: Cricetidae
- Subfamily: Sigmodontinae
- Genus: †Megalomys
- Species: †M. luciae

Binomial name
- †Megalomys luciae (Forsyth Major, 1901)

Synonyms
- Oryzomys luciae Forsyth Major, 1901; Megalomys luciae Trouessart, 1904

= Megalomys luciae =

Extinct species of rodent

Megalomys luciae, also known as the Saint Lucia pilorie or Saint Lucia giant rice rat, (Note: Or any of a variety of similar spellings.) is an extinct rodent in the family Cricetidae. It was endemic to the island of Saint Lucia, in the Lesser Antilles.

== Taxonomy ==
The first description of the species was published by Charles Immanuel Forsyth Major in 1901, under the name Oryzomys luciae. The holotype is the stuffed specimen still held by the Natural History Museum of London.. Forsyth Major stated that he believed the specimen he was examining to be the same one that was mentioned being added to a collection in a 13 November 1849 entry in the Proceedings of the Zoological Society of London, then documented as the Mus (Hesperomys) pilorides (considered a synonym of Megalomys desmarestii). Édouard Louis Trouessart moved the species from Oryzomys to Megalomys in 1904.

== Description ==
M. luciae was described as smaller than Megalomys desmarestii, a closely related species from Martinique, by Forsyth Major. The stuffed M. lucaei specimen in the collection of the Natural History Museum had a head–body length of 261 mm (10.3 in). M. luciae had slender claws and brown fur, with the fur of the specimen at the Natural History Museum having pale area under the chin and throat separated from another pale area under the lower thorax by a dark streak.

== Extinction ==
M. luciae was endemic to the island of Saint Lucia, in the Lesser Antilles, and the last known individual died in London Zoo in 1852, after three years of living in captivity. It probably became extinct in the latter half of the 19th century due to introduction of the invasive small Indian mongoose, with the last record dating from 1881, right before the introduction of the mongoose to the island.
