= Nomen nudum =

Term used in zoological and botanical nomenclature ("naked name")

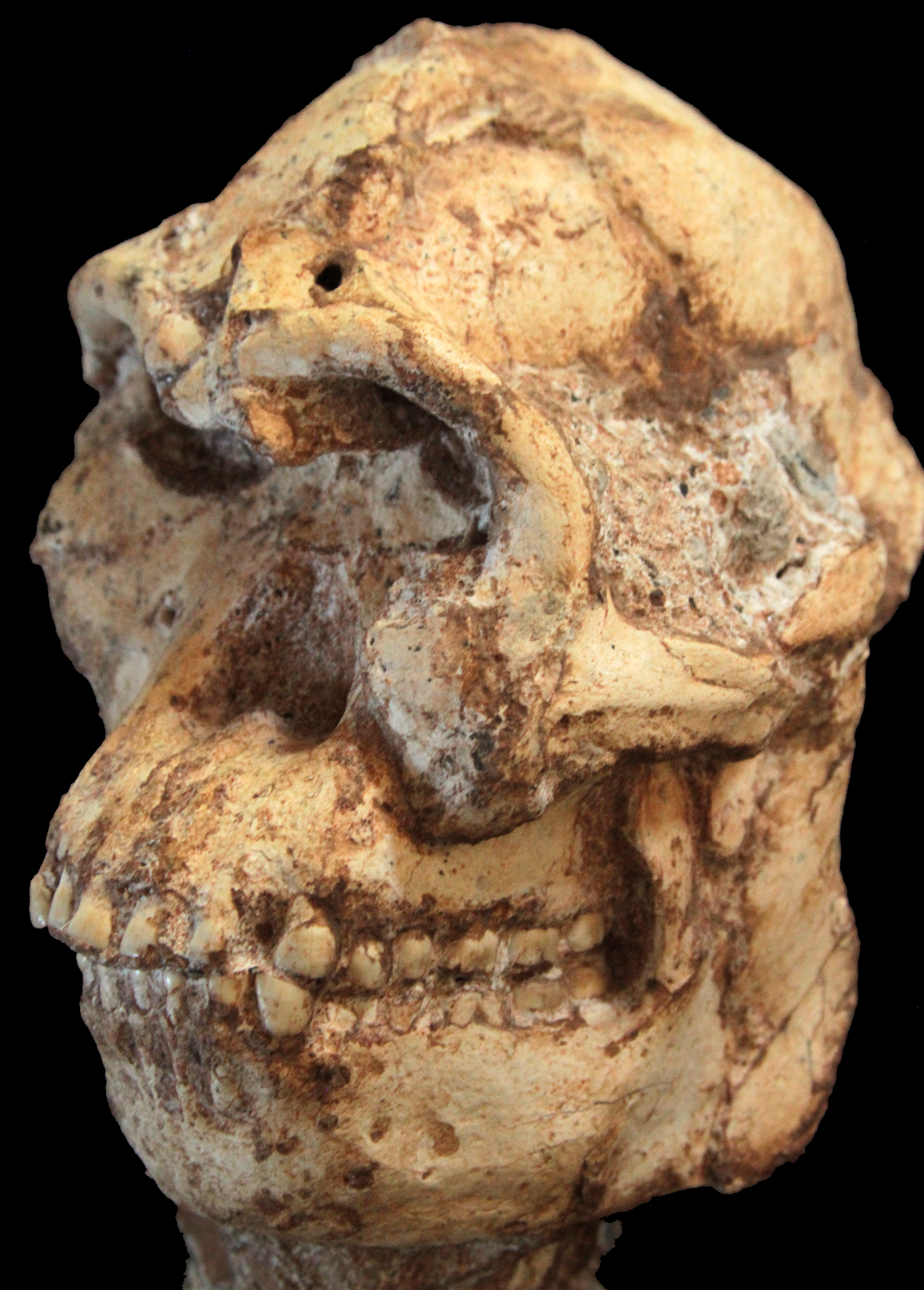
The skull of Little Foot, sometimes referred to under the nomen nudum Australopithecus prometheus

In taxonomy, a nomen nudum ('naked name'; plural nomina nuda) is a designation which looks exactly like a scientific name of an organism, and may have originally been intended to be one, but it has not been published with an adequate description. This makes it a "bare" or "naked" name, which cannot be accepted as it stands. A largely equivalent but much less frequently used term is nomen tantum ("name only"). Sometimes, "nomina nuda" is erroneously considered a synonym for the term "unavailable names". However, not all unavailable names are nomina nuda which applies to published names, i.e. any published name that does not fulfill the requirements of Article 12 (if published before 1931) or Article 13 (if published after 1930). Similarly, a species might be published with a partial or incomplete description that is not enough to follow the rules of publication. This will be described as nomen subnudum (abbreviated nom. subnud.) or occasionally as seminudum.

== In zoology ==
According to the rules of zoological nomenclature a nomen nudum is unavailable; the glossary of the International Code of Zoological Nomenclature gives this definition:

nomen nudum (pl. nomina nuda), n.
A Latin term referring to a name that, if published before 1931, fails to conform to Article 12; or, if published after 1930, fails to conform to Article 13. [...]

And among the rules of that same Zoological Code:

12.1. To be available, every new name published before 1931 must ... be accompanied by a description or a definition of the taxon that it denotes, or by an indication [i.e. that is, by reference to such a description or definition, but for a genus may also be inferred from available specific names used in combination]
13.1. To be available, every new name published after 1930 must ... be accompanied by a description or definition that states in words characters that are purported to differentiate the taxon, or be accompanied by a bibliographic reference to such a published statement.

== In botany ==
According to the rules of botanical nomenclature a nomen nudum is not validly published. The glossary of the International Code of Nomenclature for algae, fungi, and plants gives this definition:

A designation of a new taxon published without a description or diagnosis or reference to a description or diagnosis.

The requirements for the diagnosis or description are covered by articles 32, 36, 41, 42, and 44.

From 1 January 1935 to 31 December 2011, to be validly published it was also required that the description or diagnosis be in Latin as reaffirmed in the Melbourne Code article 39. After 2011 it was only recommended that the authors include or cite a Latin or English description or diagnosis.

Nomina nuda that were published before 1 January 1959 can be used to establish a cultivar name. For example, Veronica sutherlandii, a nomen nudum, has been used as the basis for Hebe pinguifolia 'Sutherlandii'.

== See also ==
- Glossary of scientific naming
- Unavailable name
- Nomen dubium
