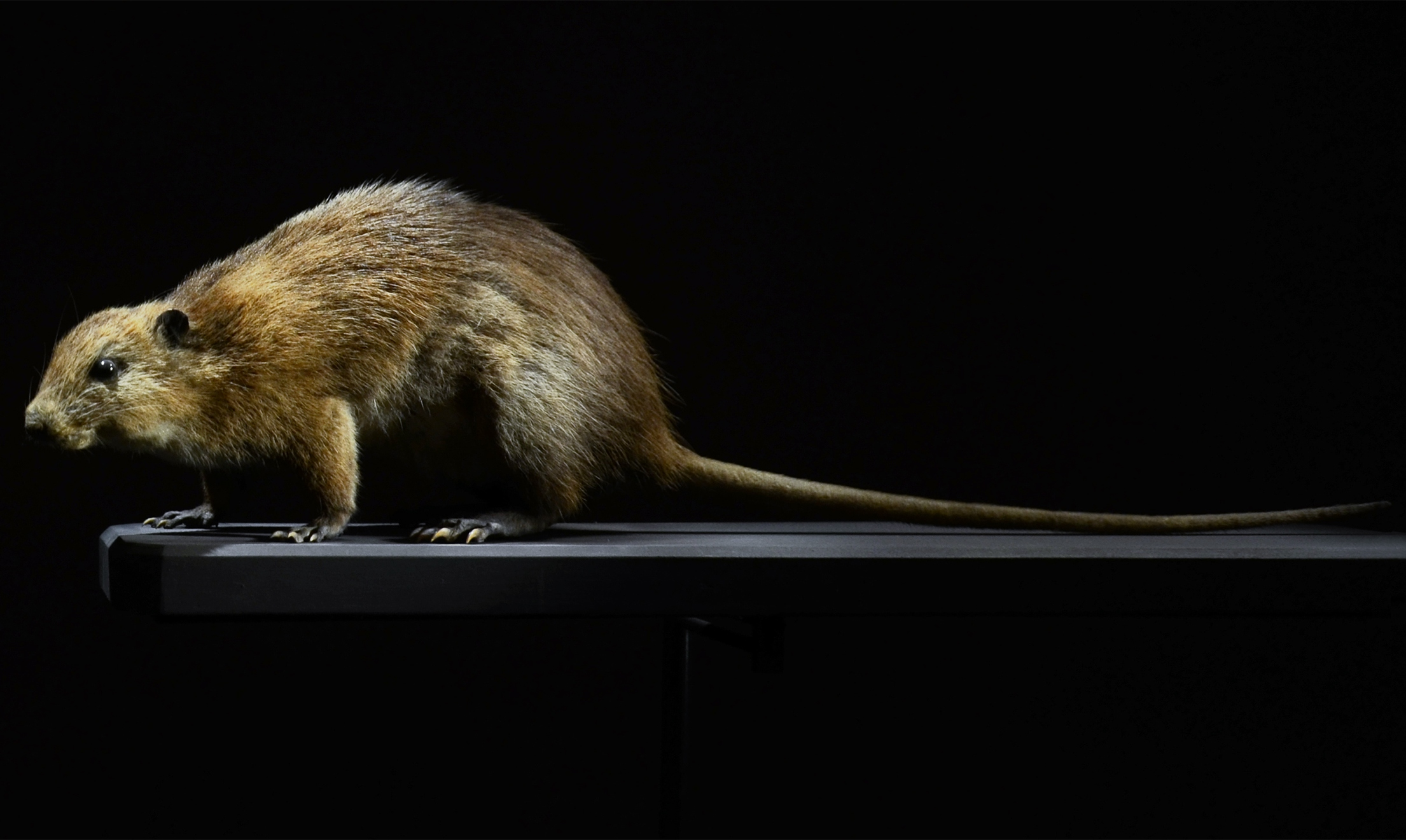
- Stuffed specimen

Conservation status
- Extinct (1897) (IUCN 3.1)

Scientific classification
- Kingdom: Animalia
- Phylum: Chordata
- Class: Mammalia
- Order: Rodentia
- Family: Cricetidae
- Subfamily: Sigmodontinae
- Genus: †Megalomys
- Species: †M. desmarestii

Binomial name
- †Megalomys desmarestii (J. Fischer, 1829)

= Megalomys desmarestii =

Extinct species of rodent

Megalomys desmarestii, also known as the Martinique muskrat, Desmarest's pilorie, or the Martinique giant rice rat, is an extinct rice rat from Martinique in the Caribbean. It was among the largest species of West Indian rice rats, growing to a length of around 36 cm (14 in), and weighed about a kilogram. It was black dorsally and white ventrally, with a long tail and small head. It was common on Martinique until the end of the 19th century and likely went extinct by 1902, primarily due to predation by introduced small Indian mongooses.

== Taxonomy ==
The Martinique muskrat was formally described by Johann Baptist Fischer in 1829.

== Description ==
The Martinique muskrat was among the largest species of West Indian rice rats, as big as a cat, and was one of the first Caribbean mammals to become extinct during the 20th century. It grew to a length of around 36 cm (14 in) and weighed about a kilogram. The species had a pelage of long, dense fur, which grew everywhere but the feet and ears. The fur was jet black above and cream-white below. The tail was black dorsally and white ventrally. It was also unusually elongate, being the size of the rest of the body. It had a small, rounded head with a fairly short snout. It may have been semi-aquatic, as it was known to escape into the sea when pursued by predators, but it never swam away from the island.

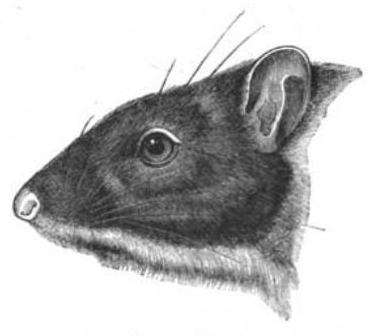
Illustration

== Extinction ==
It was common on Martinique until the end of the 19th century, when attempts were made to exterminate it because it was considered to be a pest of the island's coconut plantations in the southern units of the country. It was also hunted for food; however, due to its strong musky odor, this was uncommon. On 8 May 1902, the volcano Mount Pelée erupted, completely destroying the island's principal city of Saint-Pierre. Predation by introduced small Indian mongooses was likely the primary cause of the muskrat's extinction, but the eruption has been speculated to have been the factor that finally drove it to extinction.
