= Capsular process =

Bony capsules located in rodents

The marsh rice rat (Oryzomys palustris) has a reduced capsular process.

In rodents, the capsular process or projection is a bony capsule that contains the root of the lower incisor. It is visible on the labial (outer) side of the mandible (lower jaw) as a raising in the bone. There is marked variation within species in the development of this process.

Most oryzomyines have a well-developed capsular process, which is usually located behind the coronoid process, but many have a small one, and some lack the structure entirely. Phyllotines and akodontines are also variable in their development of a capsular process.

== Literature cited ==
- Steppan, S.J. 1995. Revision of the tribe Phyllotini (Rodentia: Sigmodontinae), with a phylogenetic hypothesis for the Sigmodontinae. Fieldiana Zoology 80:1–112.
- Weksler, M. 2006. Phylogenetic relationships of oryzomyine rodents (Muroidea: Sigmodontinae): separate and combined analyses of morphological and molecular data. Bulletin of the American Museum of Natural History 296:1–149.
