= Megalomys curazensis =

Megalomys curazensis Temporal range: Late Pleistocene (Lujanian) ~0.4–0.13 Ma

Scientific classification
- Domain: Eukaryota
- Kingdom: Animalia
- Phylum: Chordata
- Class: Mammalia
- Order: Rodentia
- Family: Cricetidae
- Subfamily: Sigmodontinae
- Genus: †Megalomys
- Species: †M. curazensis

Binomial name
- †Megalomys curazensis Hooijer, 1959

Extinct species of rodent

Megalomys curazensis is a species of rodent from the Late Pleistocene (400,000 to 130,000 years ago) of the island of Curaçao, off northwestern Venezuela. It is a member of the genus Megalomys, which also includes species from other islands of the Lesser Antilles. It is known from abundant but fragmentary material found throughout the island.
