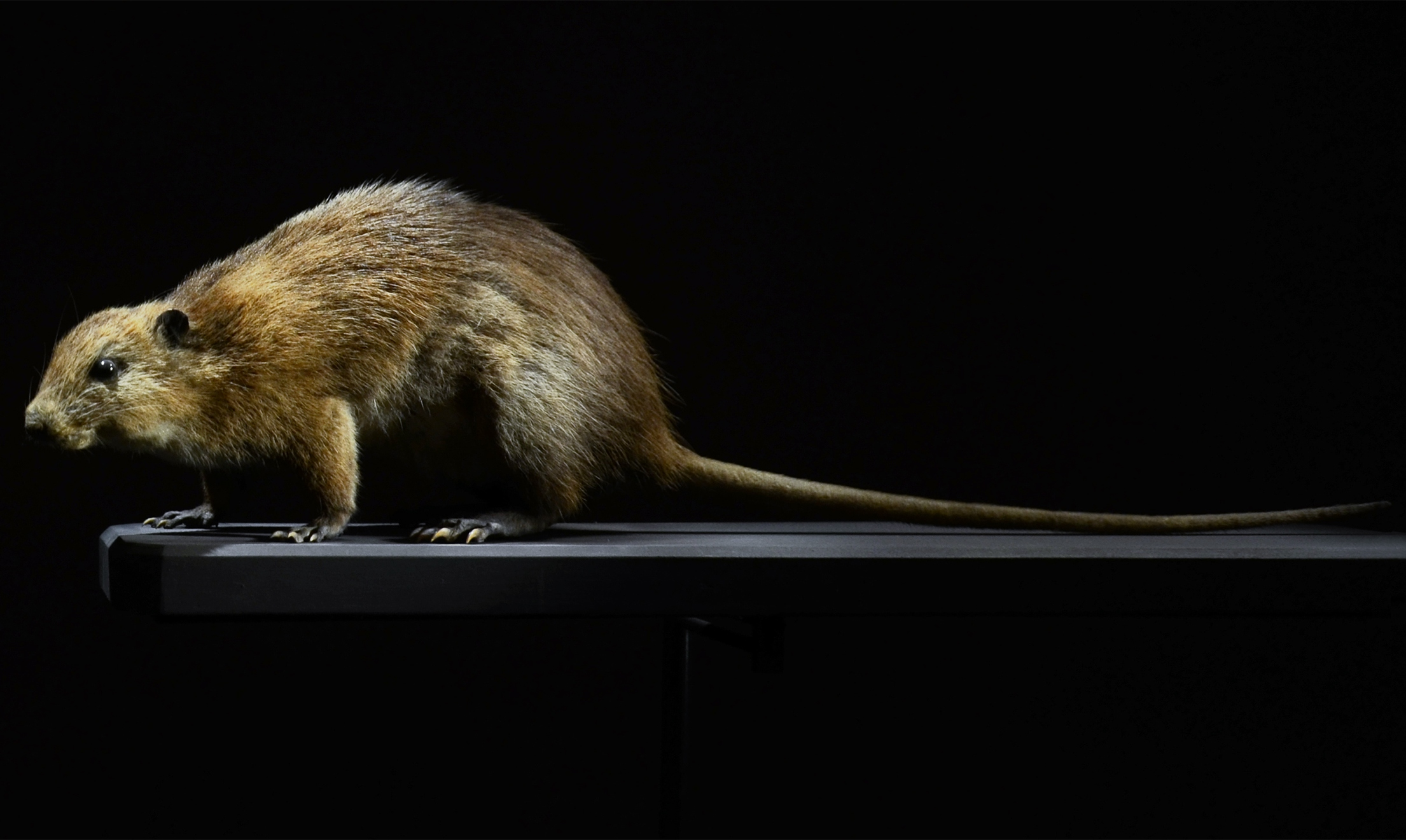
- Martinique giant rice rat (Megalomys desmarestii)
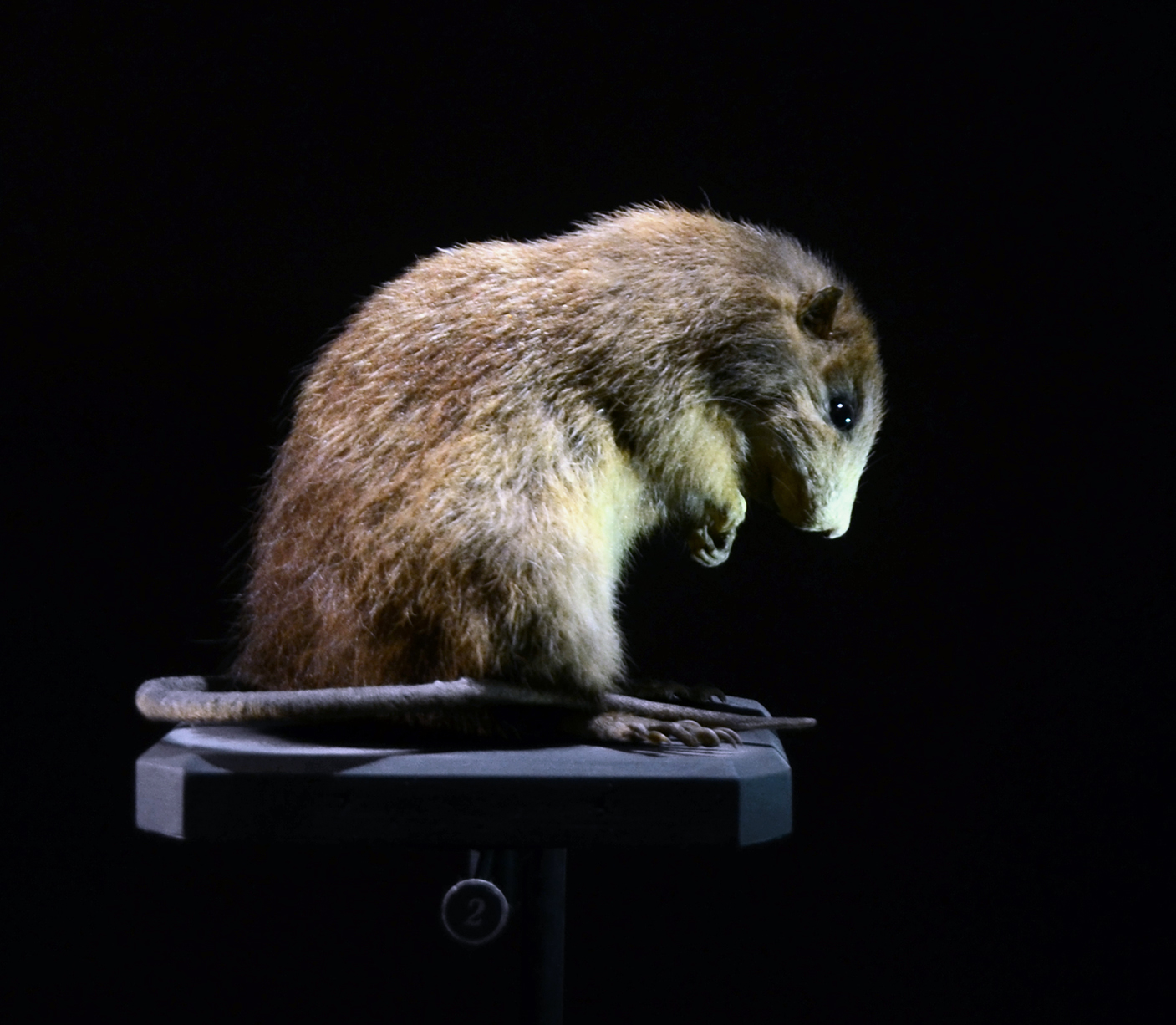
- Saint Lucia giant rice rat (Megalomys luciae)

Scientific classification
- Kingdom: Animalia
- Phylum: Chordata
- Class: Mammalia
- Order: Rodentia
- Family: Cricetidae
- Subfamily: Sigmodontinae
- Tribe: Oryzomyini
- Genus: †Megalomys; Trouessart, 1881

Species
- †Megalomys audreyae †Megalomys curazensis †Megalomys desmarestii †Megalomys georginae †Megalomys luciae

= Megalomys =

Megalomys Temporal range: 0.126–0.0000019 Ma Middle Pleistocene - Holocene

Extinct genus of rodents

Megalomys is a genus of rodent in the family Cricetidae, part of the tribe Oryzomyini. The genus contains five large rodents from various Caribbean islands, of which two are known to have survived into modern times, but all of which are now extinct. The last species to survive was M. desmarestii from Martinique, which became extinct after the Mount Pelée eruption in 1902. Ancient DNA analysis places Megalomys forming a clade with Pennatomys, sister to the clade containing Aegialomys, Nesoryzomys, Melanomys and Sigmodontomys, having diverged from the mainland clade around 7 million years ago.

It contains the following species:

Recently extinct species:

- Megalomys desmarestii (Martinique giant rice rat)
- Megalomys luciae (Saint Lucia giant rice rat)

Fossil species:

- Megalomys audreyae (Barbuda giant rice rat)
- Megalomys curazensis (Curaçao giant rice rat)
- Megalomys georginae (Barbados giant rice rat)
