= List of mammals of South America =

This is a list of the native wild mammal species recorded in South America. South America's terrestrial mammals fall into three distinct groups: "old-timers", African immigrants and recent North American immigrants. The marsupials and xenarthrans are "old-timers", their ancestors having been present on the continent since at least the very early Cenozoic Era. During the early Cenozoic, South America's only land connection was to Antarctica, so it was effectively cut off from most of the world; as the fragments of Gondwana continued to separate, this connection was lost, leaving South America an island continent. Caviomorph rodents and monkeys arrived as "waif dispersers" by rafting across the Atlantic from Africa in the Eocene epoch, 35 million or more years ago. All the remaining nonflying mammals of South America are recent arrivals, having migrated from North America via Central America during the past seven million years as part of the Great American Interchange; this invasion, which peaked around three million years ago, was made possible when the formation of the volcanic Isthmus of Panama bridged North and South America. The newcomers out-competed and drove to extinction many mammals that had evolved during South America's long period of isolation, as well as some species from other classes.

South America suffered another major loss of mammal species in the Quaternary extinction event, which started around 12,500 cal BP, at roughly the time of arrival of Paleoindians, and may have lasted up to several thousand years. At least 37 genera of mammals were eliminated, including most of the megafauna. While South America currently has no megaherbivore species weighing more than 1000 kg, prior to this event it had a menagerie of about 25 of them (consisting of gomphotheres, camelids, ground sloths, glyptodonts, and toxodontids – 75% of these being "old-timers"), dwarfing Africa's present and recent total of 6.

Anthropogenic climate change and the damage to its ecosystems resulting from the rapid recent growth of the human population pose a further threat to South America's biodiversity.

The list consists of those extant species found in the nations or overseas territories of continental South America (including their island possessions, such as the Galápagos), as well as in Trinidad and Tobago and the Falkland Islands; Panama is not included. As of May 2012, the list contains 1,331 species, 340 genera, 62 families and 15 orders. Of the taxa from nonflying, nonmarine groups (992 species, 230 genera, 40 families and 12 orders), "old-timers" comprise 14% of species, 15% of genera, 20% of families and 42% of orders; African immigrants make up 38% of species, 30% of genera, 40% of families and 17% of orders; North American invaders constitute 49% of species 55% of genera, 40% of families and 50% of orders. At the order level, the "old-timers" are overrepresented because of their ancient local origins, while the African immigrants are underrepresented because of their "sweepstakes" mode of dispersal.

Of the species, 29 are critically endangered, 64 are endangered, 111 are vulnerable, 64 are near threatened, and 255 are data deficient. (Note: This list is derived from the IUCN Red List which lists species of mammals. The taxonomy and naming of the individual species is based on those used in existing Wikipedia articles as of 21 May 2007 and supplemented by the common names and taxonomy from the IUCN, Smithsonian Institution, or University of Michigan where no Wikipedia article was available.) 32 mammal species presumed extinct since the beginning of the Holocene are included. Domestic species (e.g., the guinea pig, alpaca, and llama) and introduced species are not listed.

Note: This list is inevitably incomplete, since new species are continually being recognized via discovery or reclassification. Places to check for missing species include the list of mammals described in the 2000s, and the species listings in the articles for mammalian genera, especially those of small mammals such as rodents or bats.

The following tags are used to highlight each species' conservation status as assessed by the International Union for Conservation of Nature; those on the left are used here, those in the second column in some other articles:

EX	EX	Extinct	No reasonable doubt that the last individual has died.
EW	EW	Extinct in the wild	Known only to survive in captivity or as a naturalized population well outside its historic range.
CR	CR	Critically endangered	The species is in imminent danger of extinction in the wild.
EN	EN	Endangered	The species is facing a very high risk of extinction in the wild.
VU	VU	Vulnerable	The species is facing a high risk of extinction in the wild.
NT	NT	Near threatened	The species does not qualify as being at high risk of extinction but is likely to do so in the future.
LC	LC	Least concern	The species is not currently at risk of extinction in the wild.
DD	DD	Data deficient	There is inadequate information to assess the risk of extinction for this species.
NE	NE	Not evaluated	The conservation status of the species has not been studied.

The IUCN status of all listed species except bats was last updated between March and June 2009; bats were updated in September 2009.

== Subclass: Theria ==
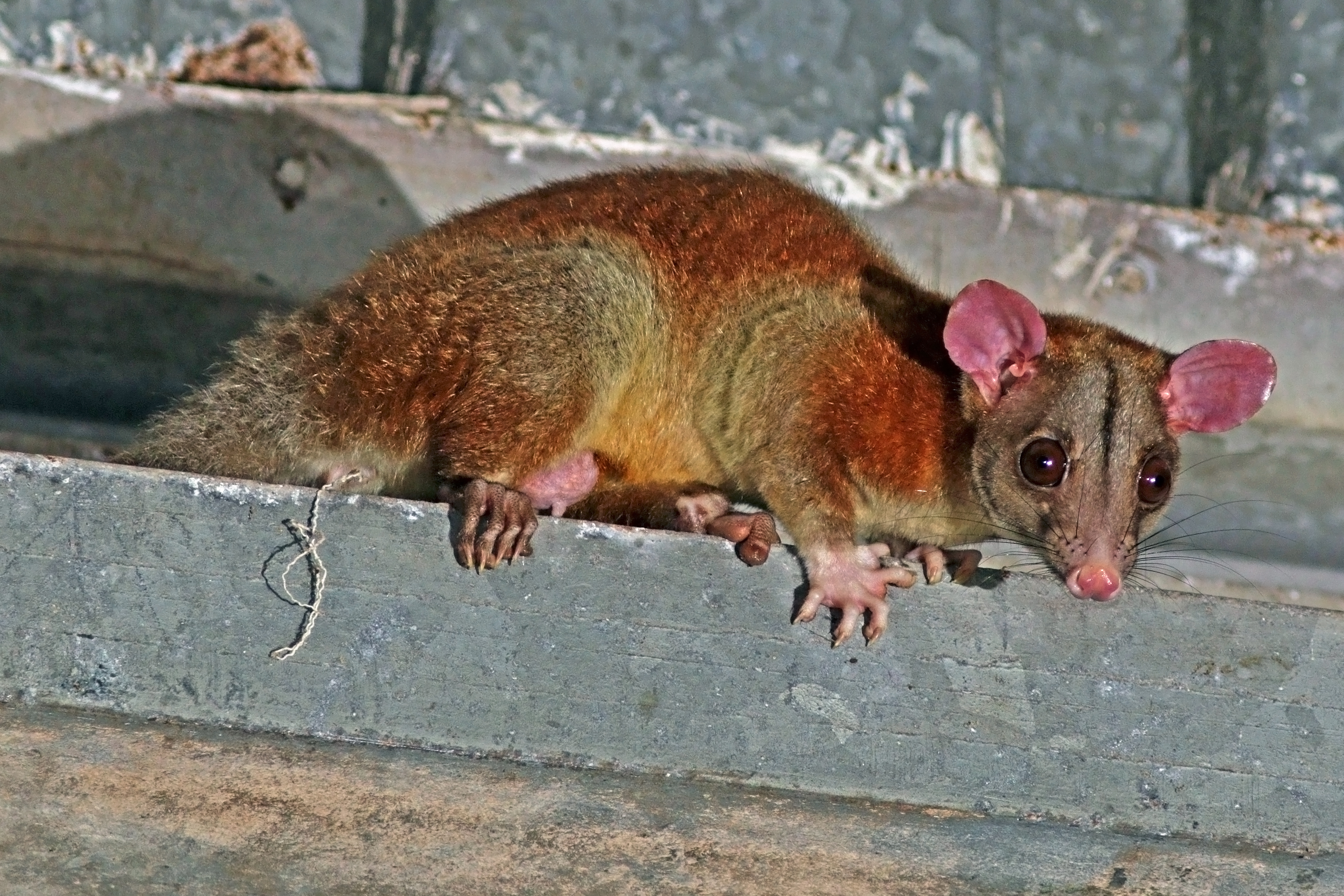
Derby's woolly opossum

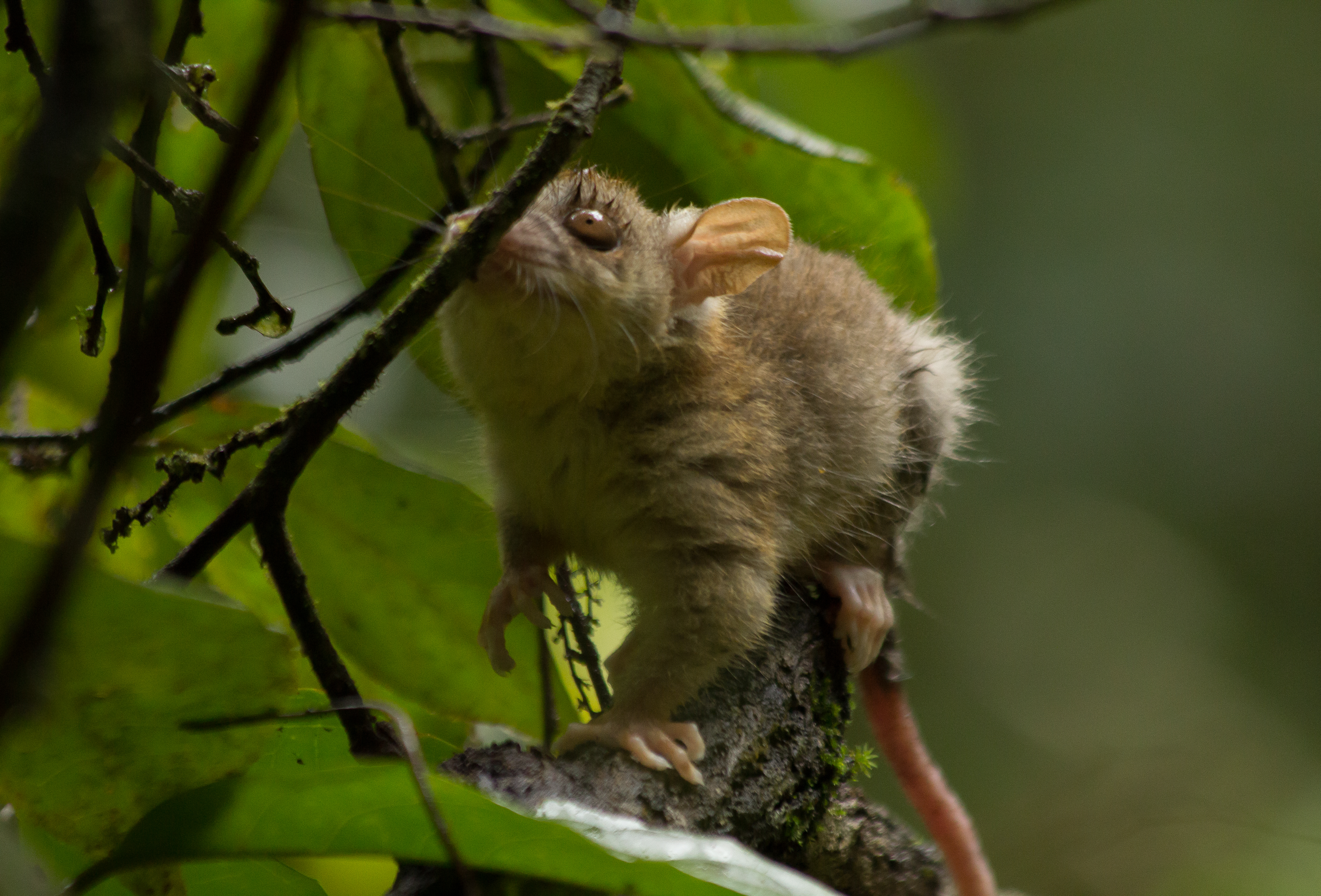
Bare-tailed woolly opossum

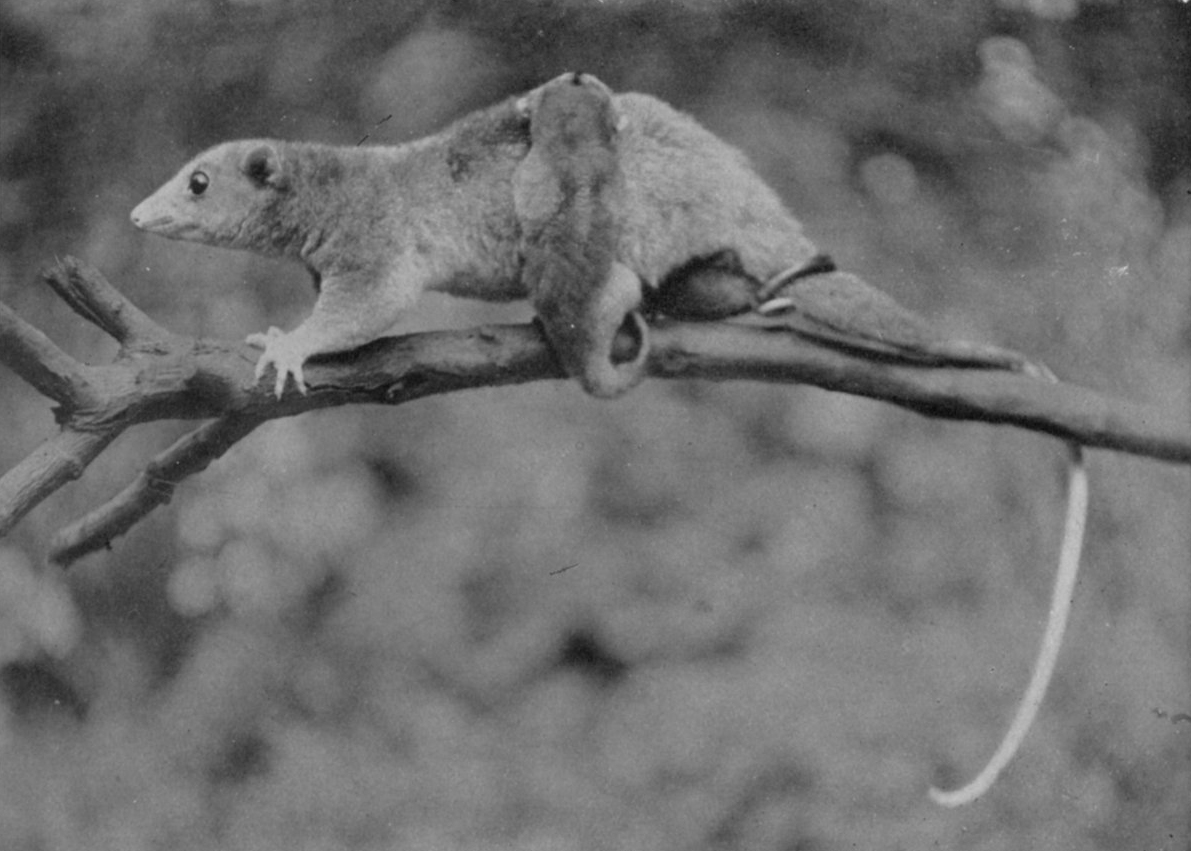
Woolly opossum (Caluromys species)

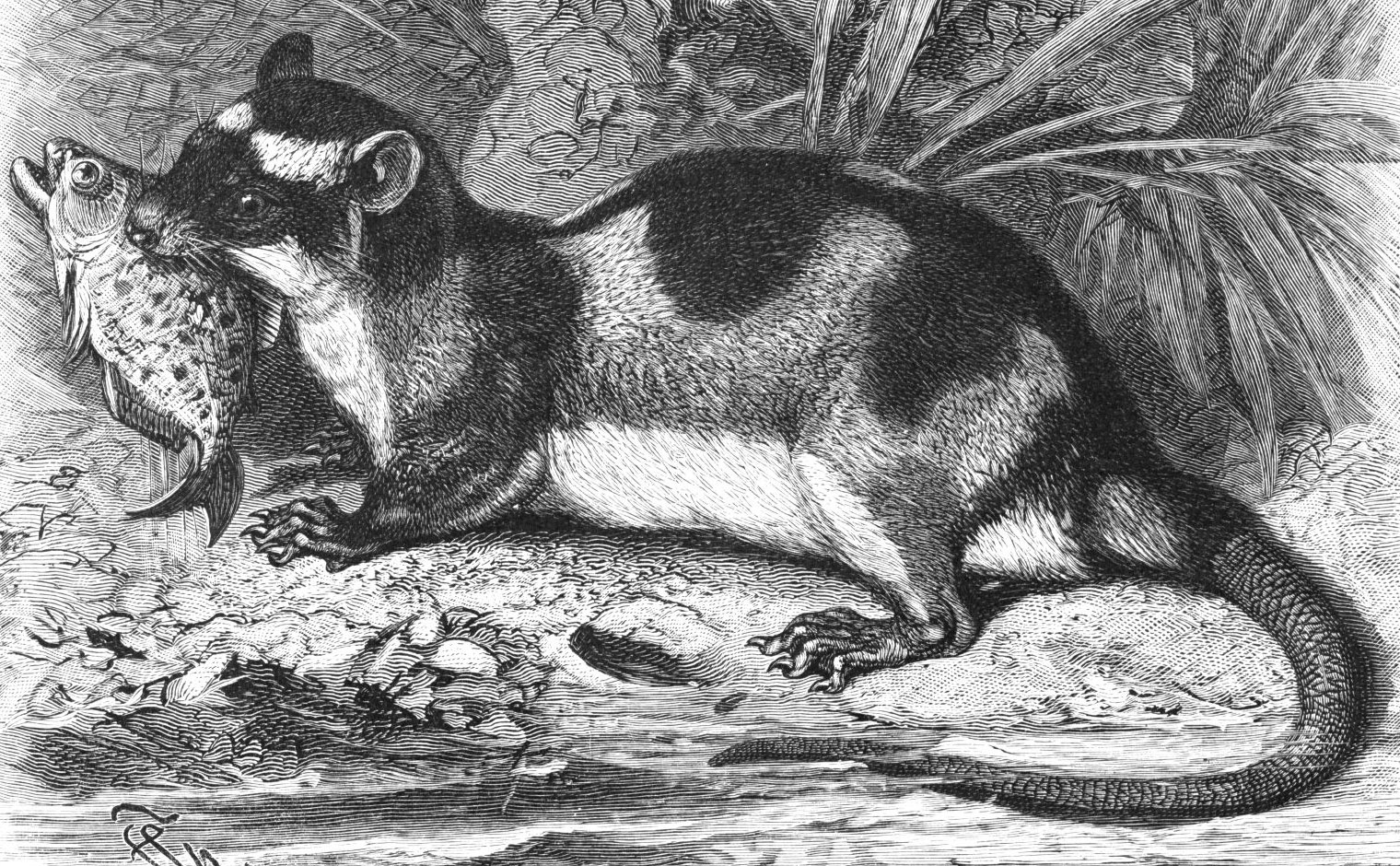
Water opossum

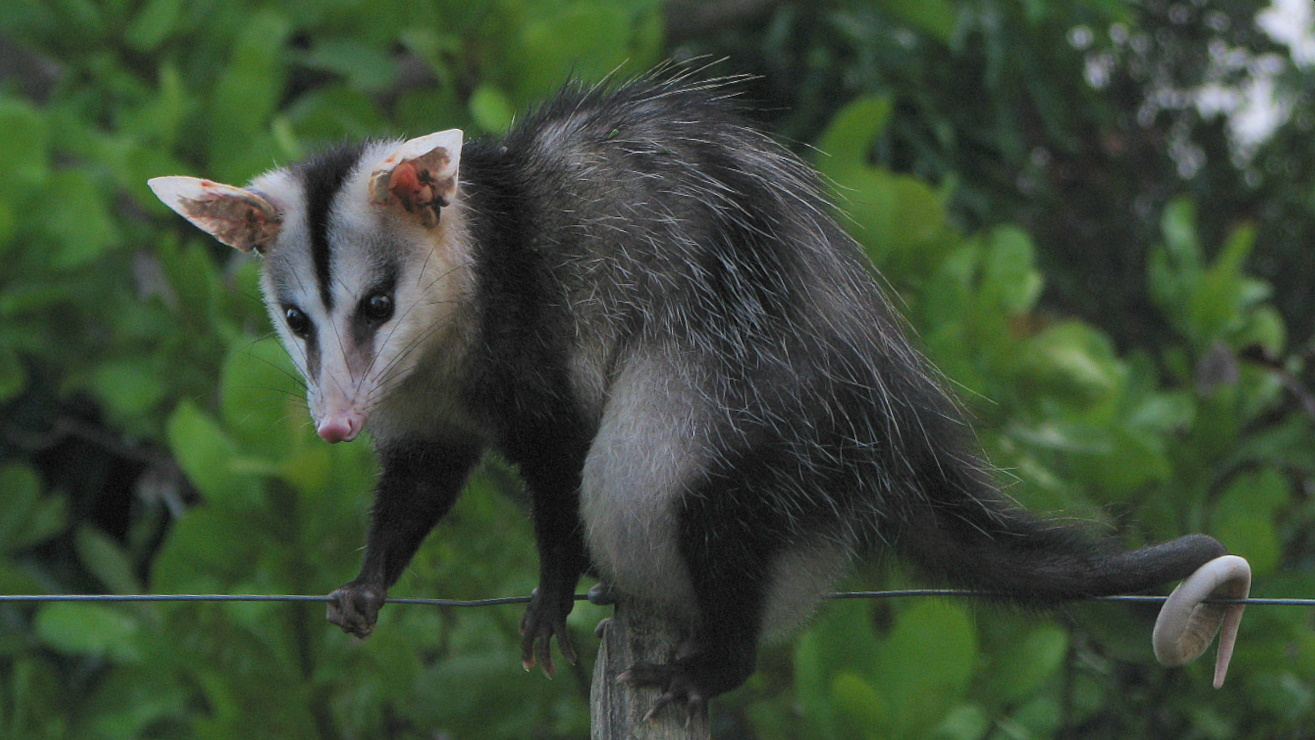
White-eared opossum

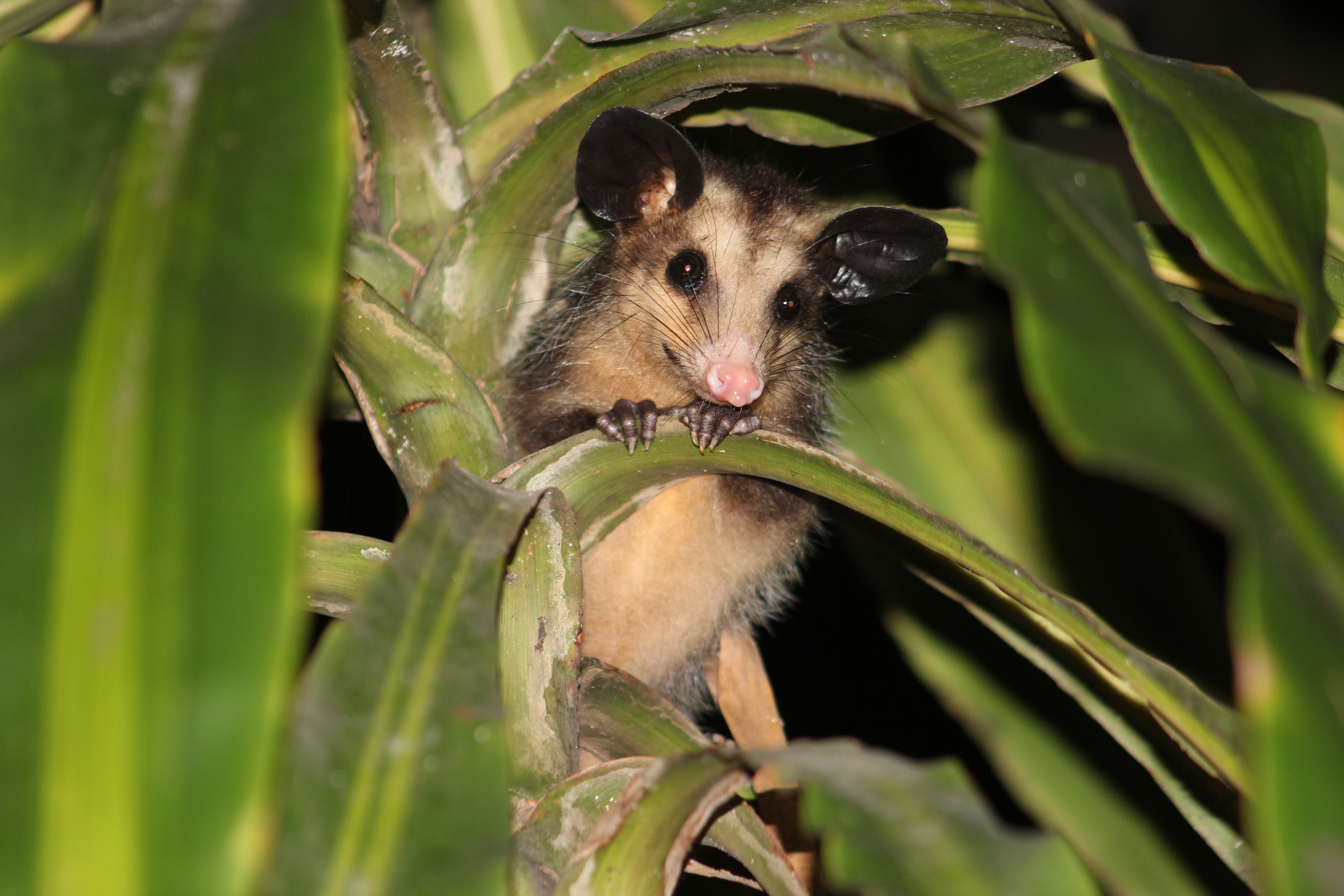
Big-eared opossum

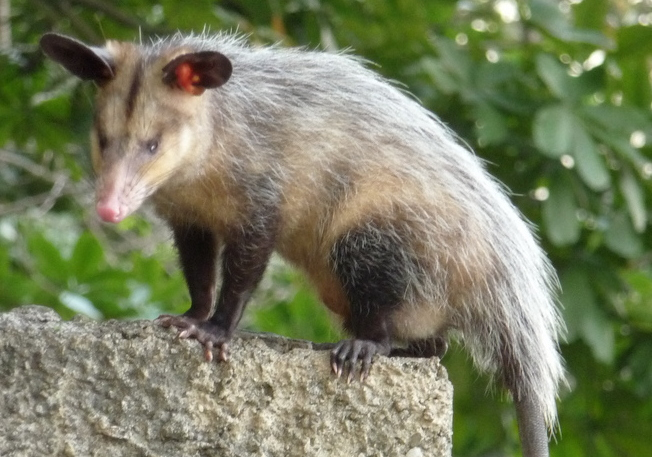
Common opossum

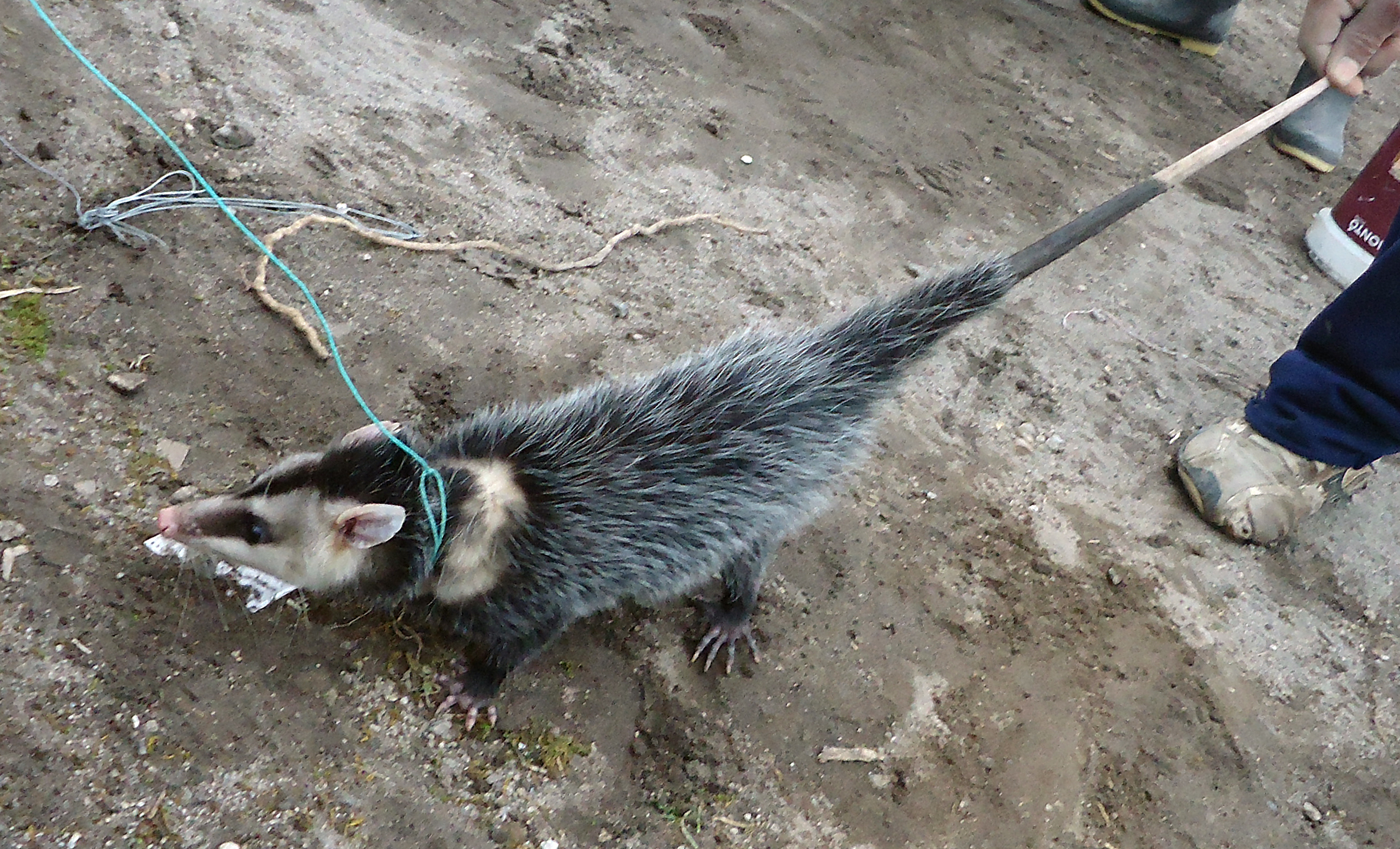
Andean white-eared opossum

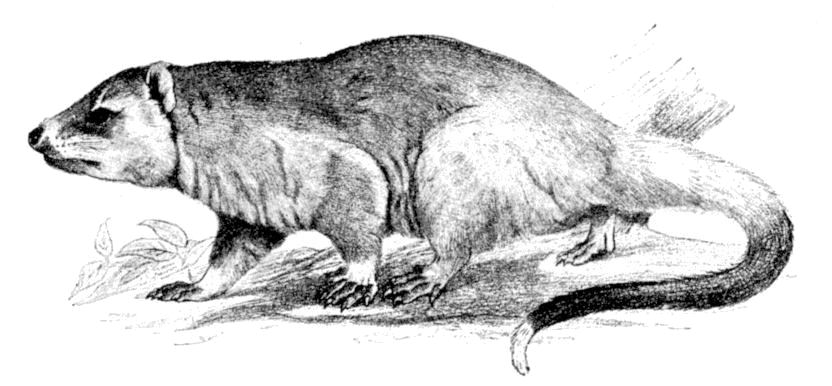
Big lutrine opossum

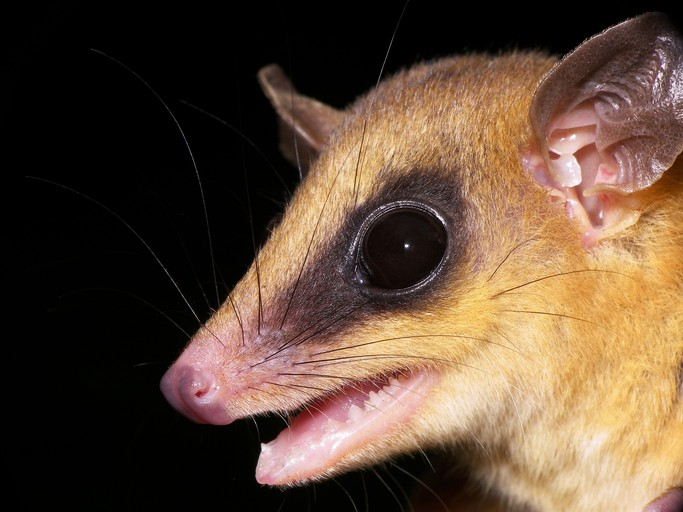
Robinson's mouse opossum

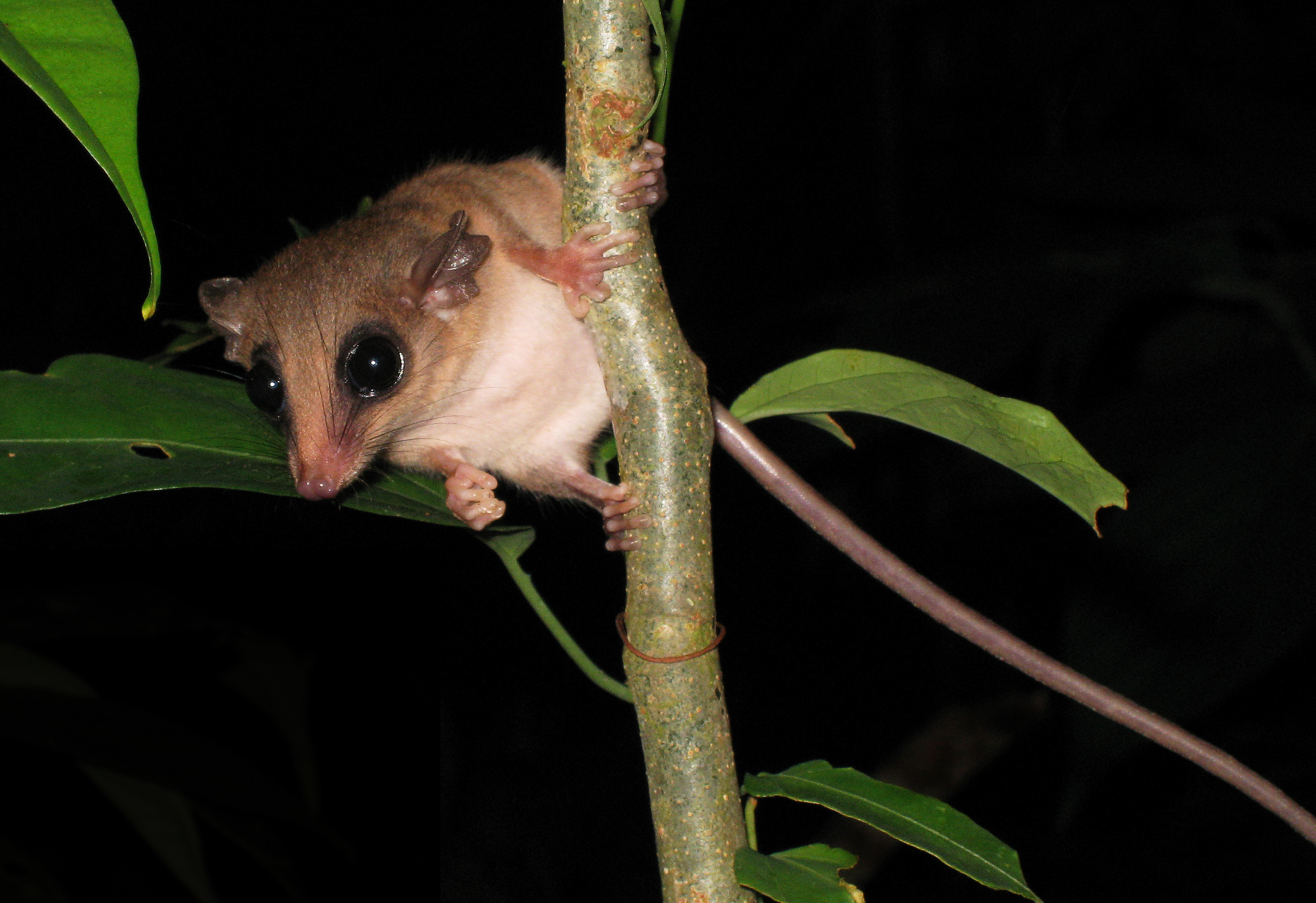
Mouse opossum (Marmosa species)

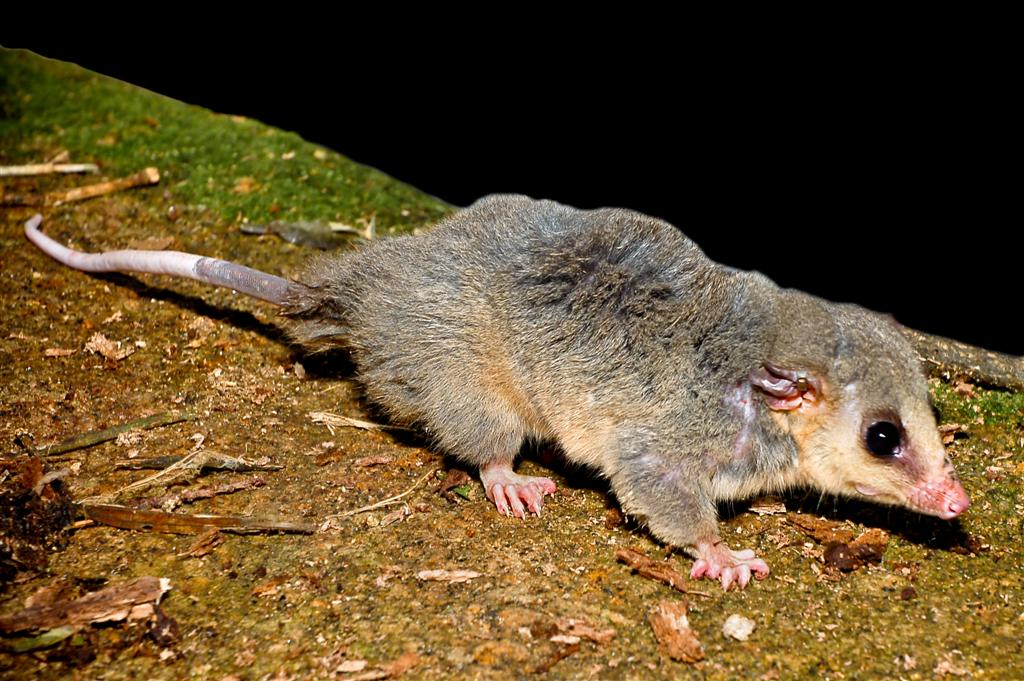
Mouse opossum (Marmosa (Micoureus) species)

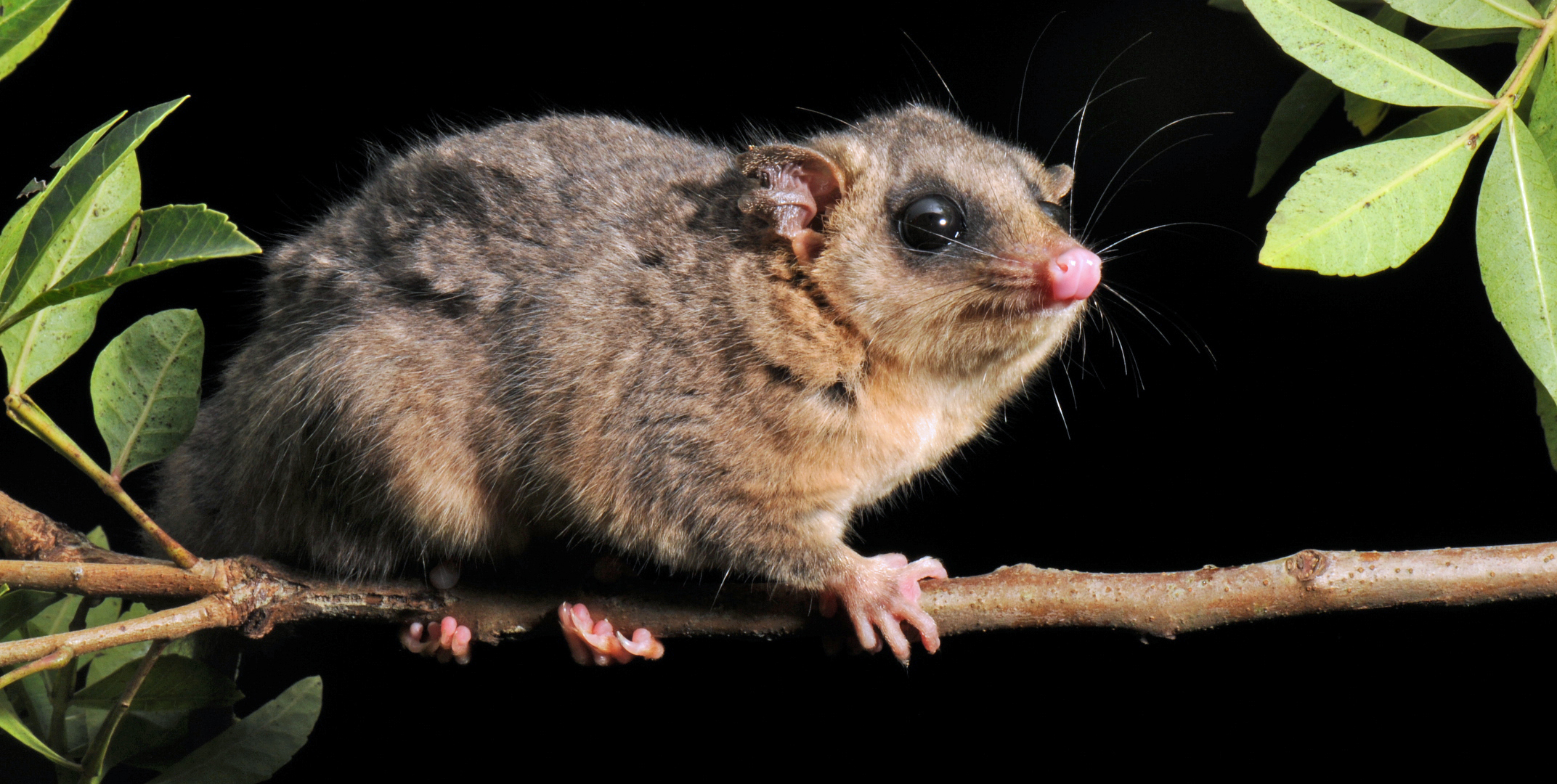
Tate's woolly mouse opossum

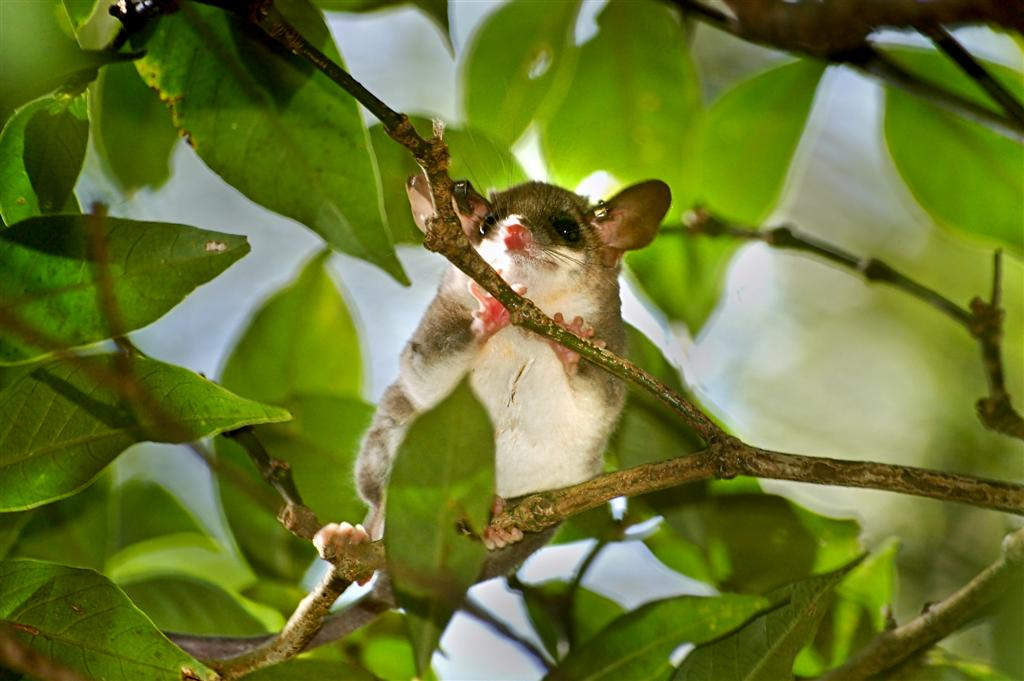
Gray slender opossum

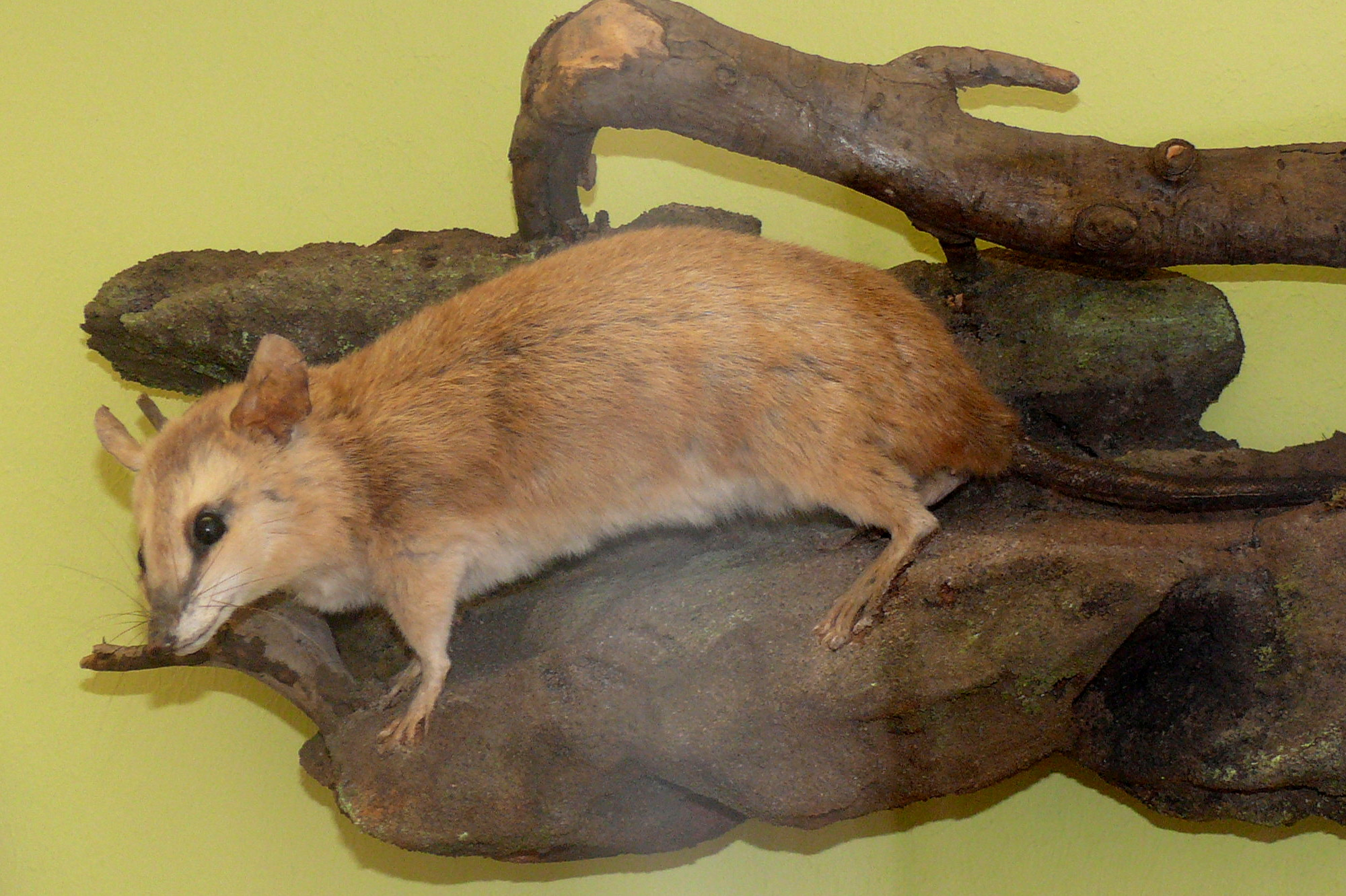
Brown four-eyed opossum

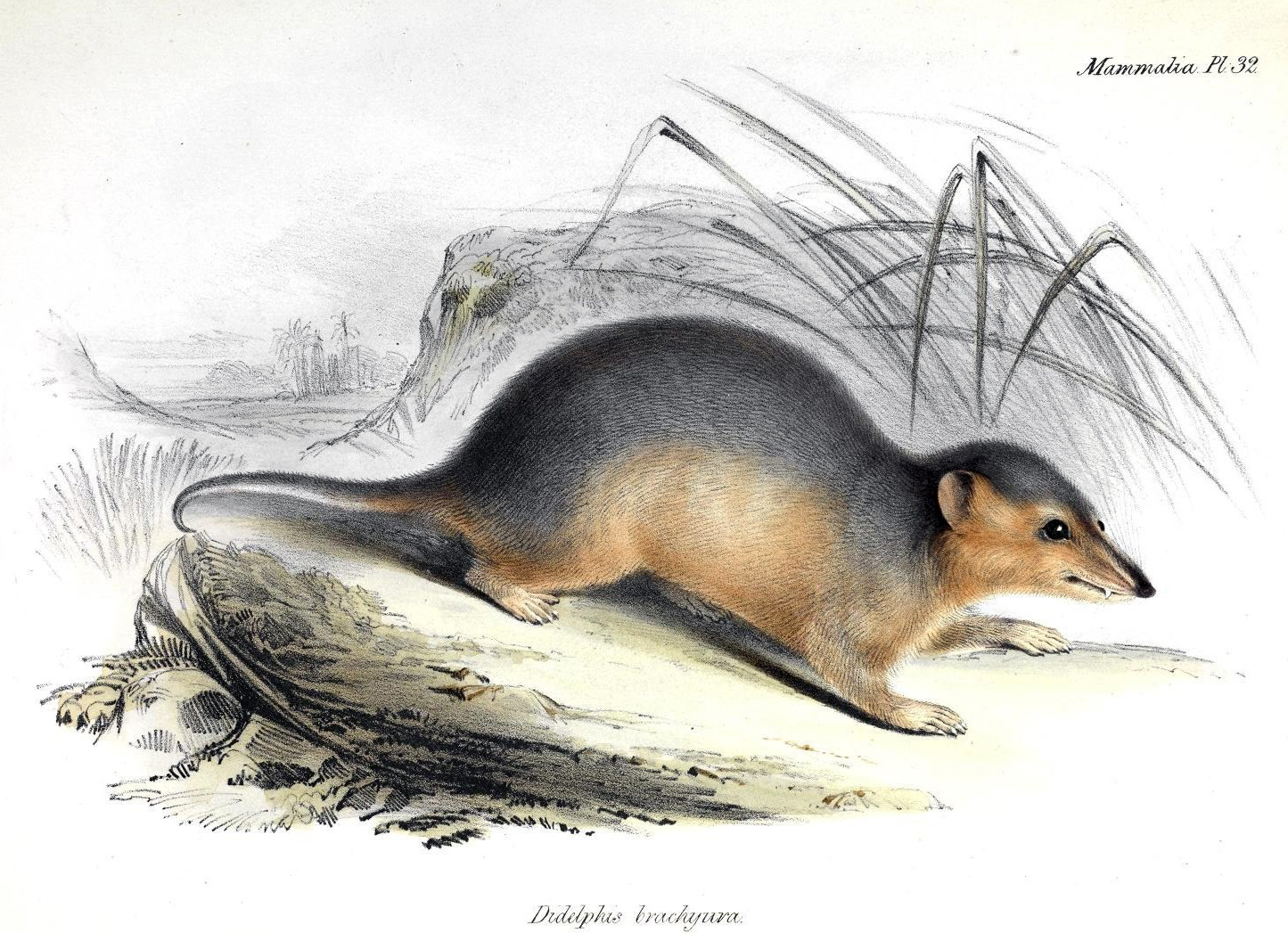
Yellow-sided opossum

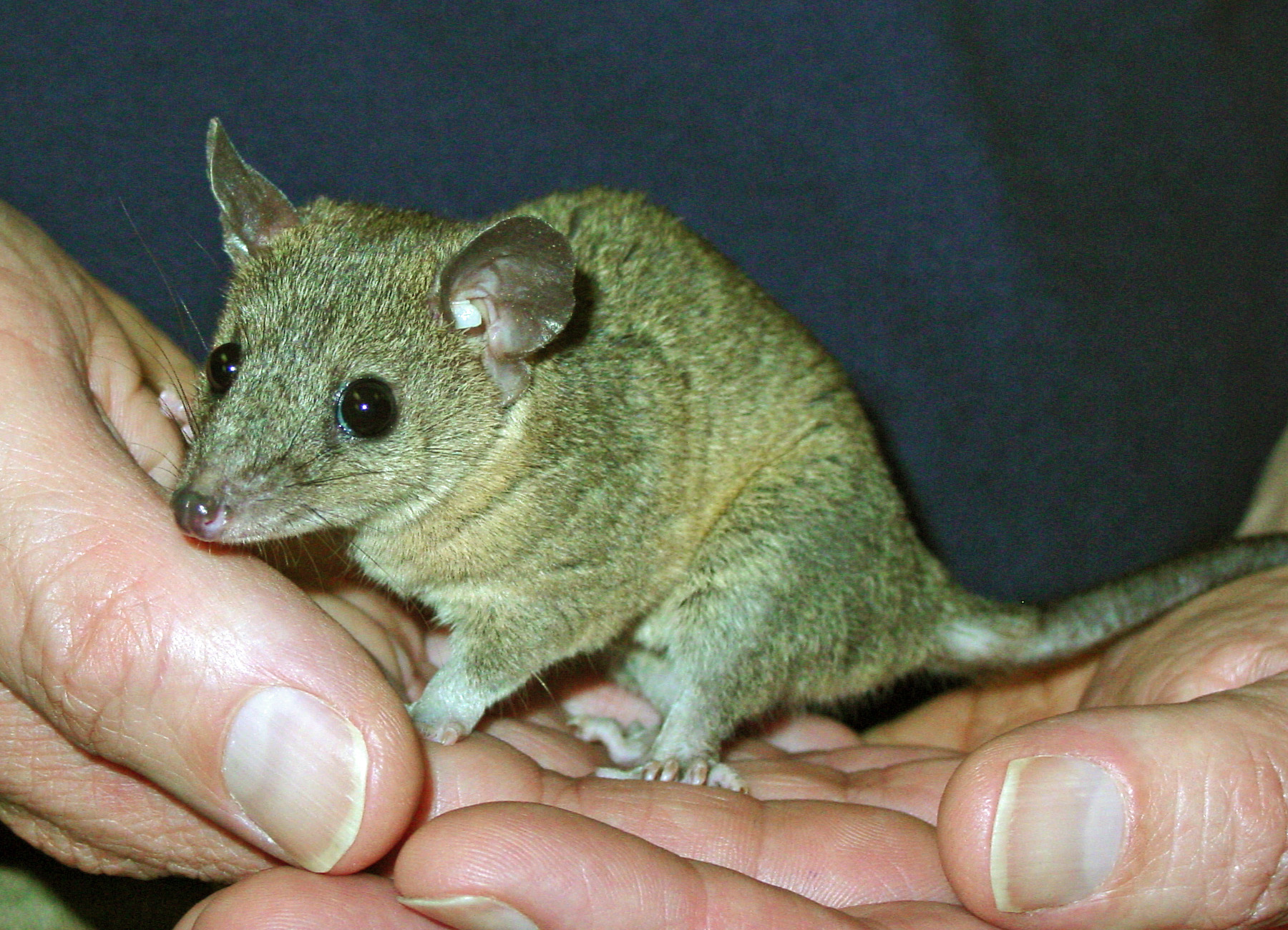
Gray short-tailed opossum

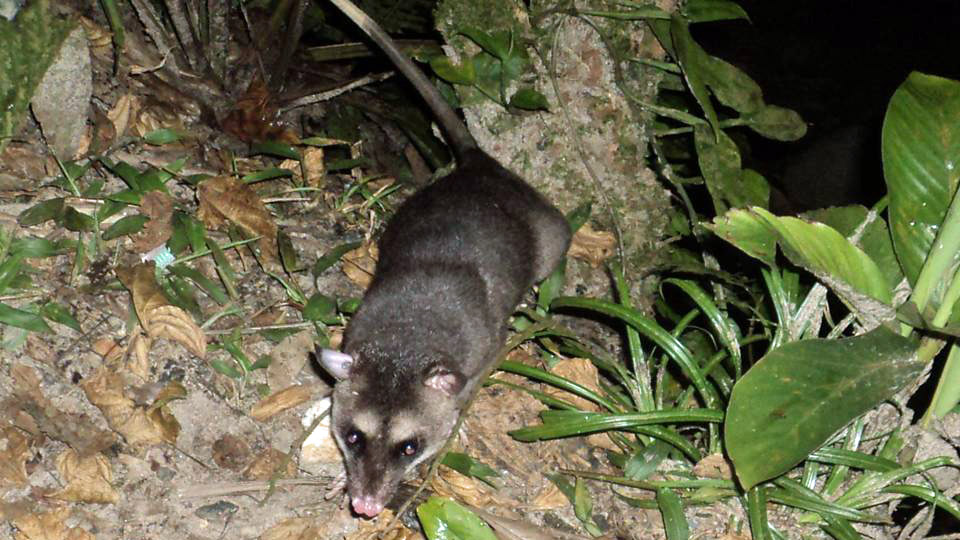
Gray four-eyed opossum

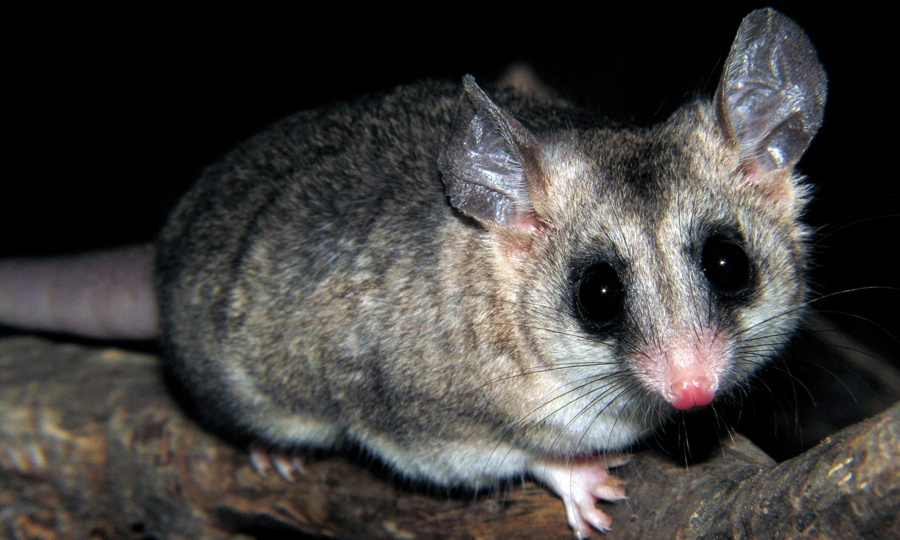
Elegant fat-tailed mouse opossum

=== Infraclass: Metatheria ===
The infraclass Metatheria includes all living and extinct marsupials, but also includes some related extinct orders of mammals that are no longer considered marsupials, such as Sparassodonta. At least six families of sparassodonts lived in South America prior to the interchange, dominating the niches for large mammalian carnivores.

Marsupials are a collection of pouched mammals that was once more widely distributed. Today they are found primarily in isolated or formerly isolated continents of Gondwanan origin. South America's 22 extant genera compares with 10 in Central America, 1 in North America north of Mexico, 52 in Australia, 28 in New Guinea and 2 in Sulawesi. South American marsupials are thought to be ancestral to those of Australasia.

==== Superorder: Ameridelphia ====
===== Order: Didelphimorphia (common opossums) =====
Didelphimorphia is the order of common opossums of the Western Hemisphere. Opossums probably diverged from the basic South American marsupials in the late Cretaceous or early Paleocene. They are small to medium-sized marsupials, about the size of a large house cat, with a long snout and prehensile tail.

- Family: Didelphidae (American opossums)
  - Subfamily: Caluromyinae
    - Genus: Caluromys
      - Derby's woolly opossum, C. derbianus LC
      - Brown-eared woolly opossum, C. lanatus LC
      - Bare-tailed woolly opossum, C. philander LC
    - Genus: Caluromysiops
      - Black-shouldered opossum, Caluromysiops irrupta LC
  - Subfamily: Glironiinae
    - Genus: Glironia
      - Bushy-tailed opossum, Glironia venusta LC
  - Subfamily: Hyladelphinae
    - Genus: Hyladelphys
      - Kalinowski's mouse opossum, Hyladelphys kalinowskii LC
  - Subfamily: Didelphinae
    - Genus Chacodelphys
      - Chacoan pygmy opossum, Chacodelphys formosa VU
    - Genus: Chironectes
      - Water opossum, Chironectes minimus LC
    - Genus Cryptonanus
      - Agricola's gracile opossum, Cryptonanus agricolai DD
      - Chacoan gracile opossum, Cryptonanus chacoensis LC
      - Guahiba gracile opossum, Cryptonanus guahybae DD
      - Unduavi gracile opossum, Cryptonanus unduaviensis DD
    - Genus: Didelphis
      - White-eared opossum, Didelphis albiventris LC
      - Big-eared opossum, Didelphis aurita LC
      - Guianan white-eared opossum, Didelphis imperfecta LC
      - Common opossum, Didelphis marsupialis LC
      - Andean white-eared opossum, Didelphis pernigra LC
    - Genus: Gracilinanus
      - Aceramarca gracile opossum, Gracilinanus aceramarcae LC
      - Agile gracile opossum, Gracilinanus agilis LC
      - Wood sprite gracile opossum, Gracilinanus dryas NT
      - Emilia's gracile opossum, Gracilinanus emiliae DD
      - Northern gracile opossum, Gracilinanus marica LC
      - Brazilian gracile opossum, Gracilinanus microtarsus LC
    - Genus: Lestodelphys
      - Patagonian opossum, Lestodelphys halli LC
    - Genus: Lutreolina
      - Big lutrine opossum, Lutreolina crassicaudata LC
      - Massoia's lutrine opossum, Lutreolina massoia LC
    - Genus: Marmosa
      - Subgenus: Eomarmosa
        - Red mouse opossum, Marmosa rubra DD
      - Subgenus: Exulomarmosa
        - Isthmian mouse opossum, Marmosa isthmica
        - Robinson's mouse opossum, Marmosa robinsoni LC
        - Marmosa simonsi
        - Guajira mouse opossum, Marmosa xerophila VU
        - Marmosa zeledoni
      - Subgenus: Marmosa
        - Quechuan mouse opossum, Marmosa macrotarsus LC
        - Linnaeus's mouse opossum, Marmosa murina LC
        - Tyler's mouse opossum, Marmosa tyleriana DD
        - Marmosa waterhousei
      - Subgenus: Micoureus
        - Alston's mouse opossum, Marmosa alstoni LC
        - White-bellied woolly mouse opossum, Marmosa constantiae LC
        - Woolly mouse opossum, Marmosa demerarae LC
        - Tate's woolly mouse opossum, Marmosa paraguayana LC
        - Little woolly mouse opossum, Marmosa phaea VU
        - Bare-tailed woolly mouse opossum, Marmosa regina LC
      - Subgenus: Stegomarmosa
        - Heavy-browed mouse opossum, Marmosa andersoni DD
        - Rufous mouse opossum, Marmosa lepida LC
    - Genus: Marmosops
      - Bishop's slender opossum, Marmosops bishopi LC
      - Marmosops caucae
      - Narrow-headed slender opossum, Marmosops cracens DD
      - Creighton's slender opossum, Marmosops creightoni DD
      - Dusky slender opossum, Marmosops fuscatus DD
      - Handley's slender opossum, Marmosops handleyi CR
      - Tschudi's slender opossum, Marmosops impavidus LC
      - Gray slender opossum, Marmosops incanus LC
      - Junin slender opossum, Marmosops juninensis VU
      - Neblina slender opossum, Marmosops neblina LC
      - White-bellied slender opossum, Marmosops noctivagus LC
      - Dorothy's slender opossum, Marmosops ocellatus LC
      - Delicate slender opossum, Marmosops parvidens LC
      - Brazilian slender opossum, Marmosops paulensis LC
      - Pinheiro's slender opossum, Marmosops pinheiroi LC
    - Genus: Metachirus
      - Brown four-eyed opossum, Metachirus nudicaudatus LC
    - Genus: Monodelphis
      - Sepia short-tailed opossum, Monodelphis adusta LC
      - Northern three-striped opossum, Monodelphis americana LC
      - Monodelphis arlindoi
      - Northern red-sided opossum, Monodelphis brevicaudata LC
      - Yellow-sided opossum, Monodelphis dimidiata LC
      - Gray short-tailed opossum, Monodelphis domestica LC
      - Emilia's short-tailed opossum, Monodelphis emiliae LC
      - Monodelphis gardneri
      - Amazonian red-sided opossum, Monodelphis glirina LC
      - Monodelphis handleyi
      - Ihering's three-striped opossum, Monodelphis iheringi DD
      - Pygmy short-tailed opossum, Monodelphis kunsi LC
      - Marajó short-tailed opossum, Monodelphis maraxina DD
      - Osgood's short-tailed opossum, Monodelphis osgoodi LC
      - Hooded red-sided opossum, Monodelphis palliolata LC
      - Monodelphis peruviana
      - Reig's opossum, Monodelphis reigi VU
      - Ronald's opossum, Monodelphis ronaldi LC
      - Chestnut-striped opossum, Monodelphis rubida DD
      - Monodelphis sanctaerosae
      - Long-nosed short-tailed opossum, Monodelphis scalops LC
      - Southern red-sided opossum, Monodelphis sorex LC
      - Southern three-striped opossum, Monodelphis theresa DD
      - Monodelphis touan
      - Red three-striped opossum, Monodelphis umbristriata VU
      - One-striped opossum, Monodelphis unistriata DD
    - Genus: Philander
      - Anderson's four-eyed opossum, Philander andersoni LC
      - Deltaic four-eyed opossum, Philander deltae LC
      - Southeastern four-eyed opossum, Philander frenata LC
      - McIlhenny's four-eyed opossum, Philander mcilhennyi LC
      - Mondolfi's four-eyed opossum, Philander mondolfii LC
      - Olrog's four-eyed opossum, Philander olrogi
      - Gray four-eyed opossum, Philander opossum LC
    - Genus: Thylamys
      - Cinderella fat-tailed mouse opossum, Thylamys cinderella LC
      - Thylamys citellus
      - Elegant fat-tailed mouse opossum, Thylamys elegans LC
      - Karimi's fat-tailed mouse opossum, Thylamys karimii VU
      - Paraguayan fat-tailed mouse opossum, Thylamys macrura NT
      - White-bellied fat-tailed mouse opossum, Thylamys pallidior LC
      - Thylamys pulchellus
      - Common fat-tailed mouse opossum, Thylamys pusillus LC
      - Argentine fat-tailed mouse opossum, Thylamys sponsorius LC
      - Tate's fat-tailed mouse opossum, Thylamys tatei DD
      - Dwarf fat-tailed mouse opossum, Thylamys velutinus LC
      - Buff-bellied fat-tailed mouse opossum, Thylamys venustus DD

===== Order: Paucituberculata (shrew opossums) =====
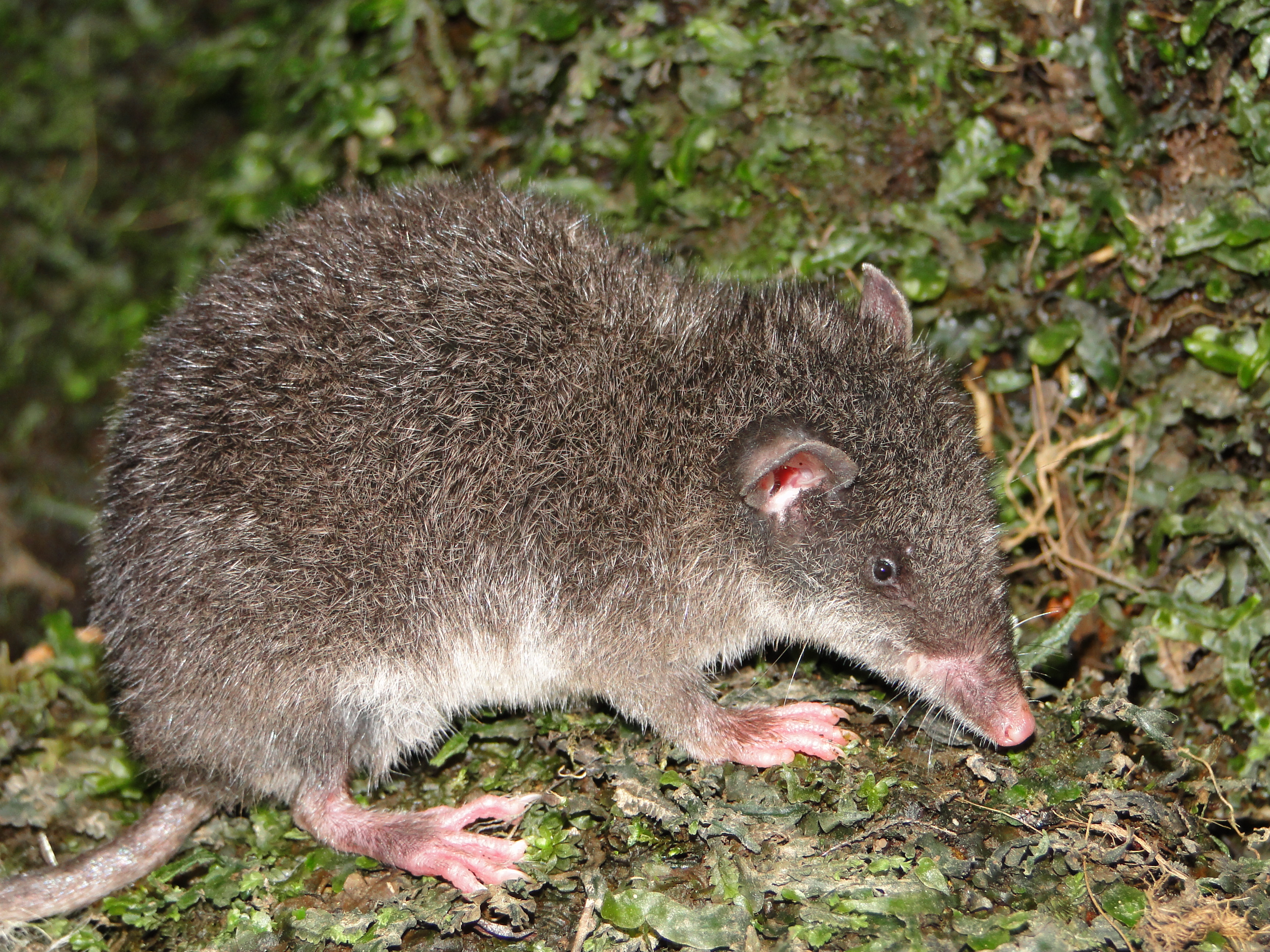
Eastern caenolestid

There are six extant species of shrew opossum. They are small shrew-like marsupials confined to the Andes.

- Family: Caenolestidae
  - Genus: Caenolestes
    - Gray-bellied caenolestid, Caenolestes caniventer NT
    - Andean caenolestid, Caenolestes condorensis VU
    - Northern caenolestid, Caenolestes convelatus VU
    - Dusky caenolestid, Caenolestes fuliginosus LC
    - Eastern caenolestid, Caenolestes sangay VU
  - Genus: Lestoros
    - Incan caenolestid, Lestoros inca LC
  - Genus: Rhyncholestes
    - Long-nosed caenolestid, Rhyncholestes raphanurus NT

==== Superorder: Australidelphia ====
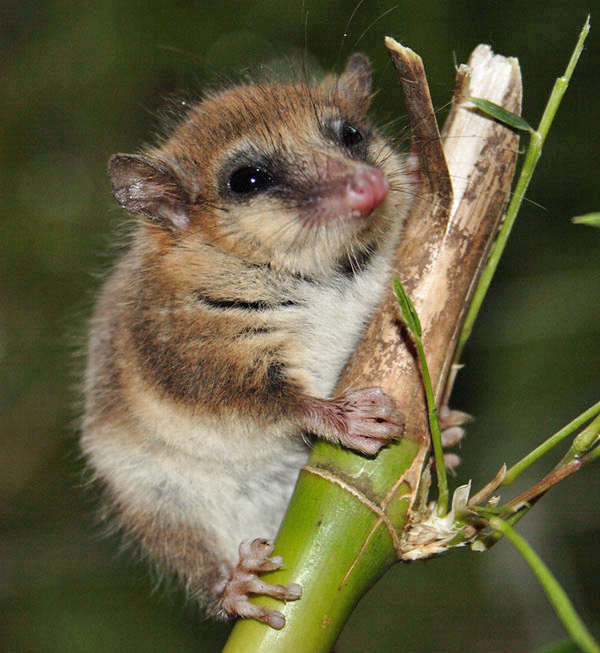
Monito del monte on bamboo

===== Order: Microbiotheria (monito del monte) =====
The monito del monte of Chile and Argentina is the only extant member of its family and the only surviving member of an ancient order, Microbiotheria. It appears to be more closely related to Australian marsupials than to other Neotropic marsupials; this is a reflection of the South American origin of all Australasian marsupials.

- Family: Microbiotheriidae
  - Genus: Dromiciops
    - Monito del monte, Dromiciops gliroides NT

=== Infraclass: Eutheria ===
==== Superorder: Afrotheria ====
===== Order: Sirenia (manatees and dugongs) =====
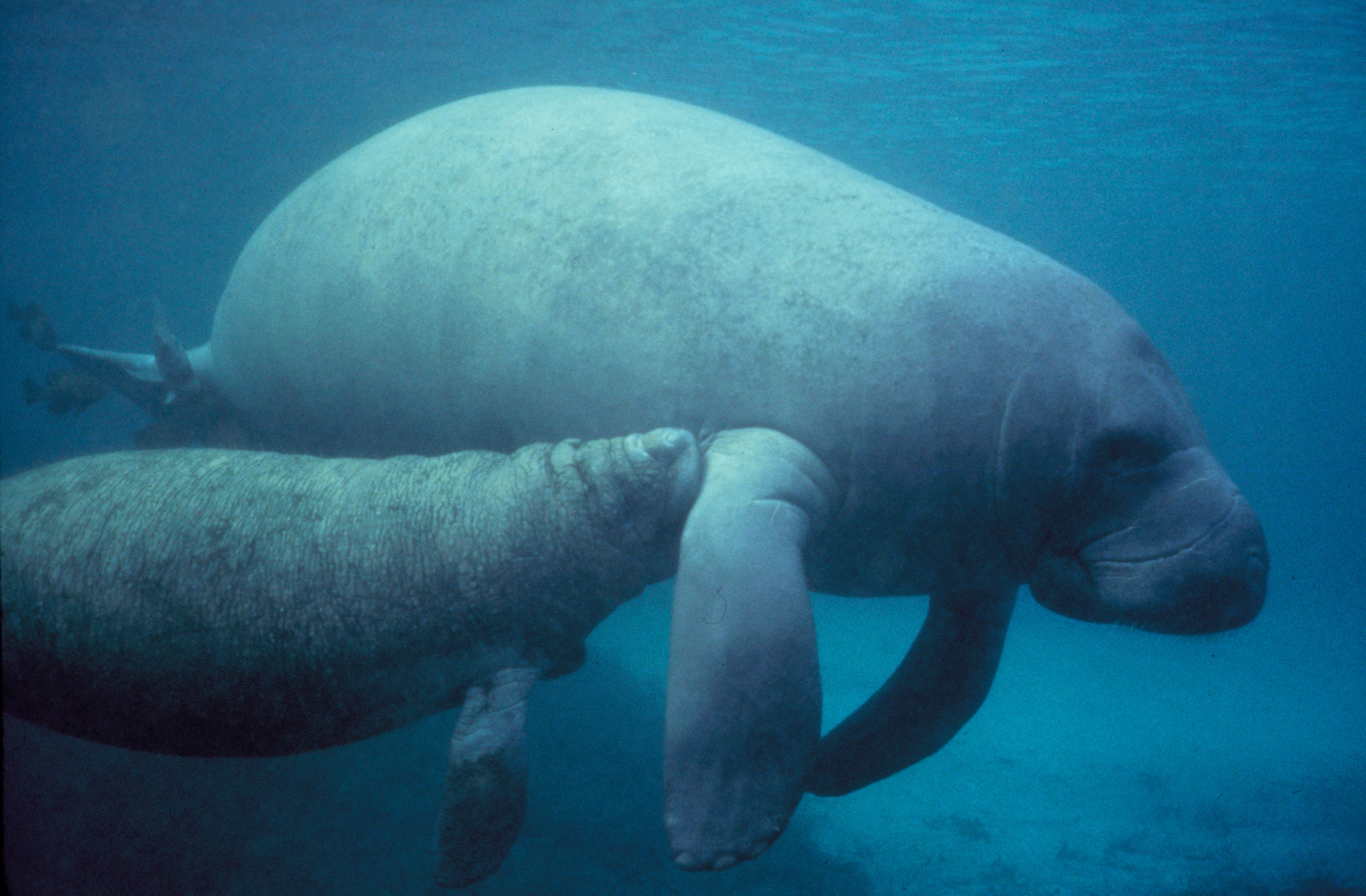
West Indian manatee

Sirenia is an order of fully aquatic, herbivorous mammals that inhabit rivers, estuaries, coastal marine waters, swamps, and marine wetlands. All four species are endangered. They evolved about 50 million years ago, and their closest living relatives are elephants. The manatees are the only extant afrotherians in the Americas. However, a number proboscid species, some of which survived until the arrival of Paleoindians, once inhabited the region. Those that reached South America have usually been classified as gomphotheres, but sometimes instead as elephantids.

- Family: Trichechidae
  - Genus: Trichechus
    - Amazonian manatee, T. inunguis VU
    - West Indian manatee, T. manatus VU

==== Superorder: Xenarthra ====
===== Order: Cingulata (armadillos) =====
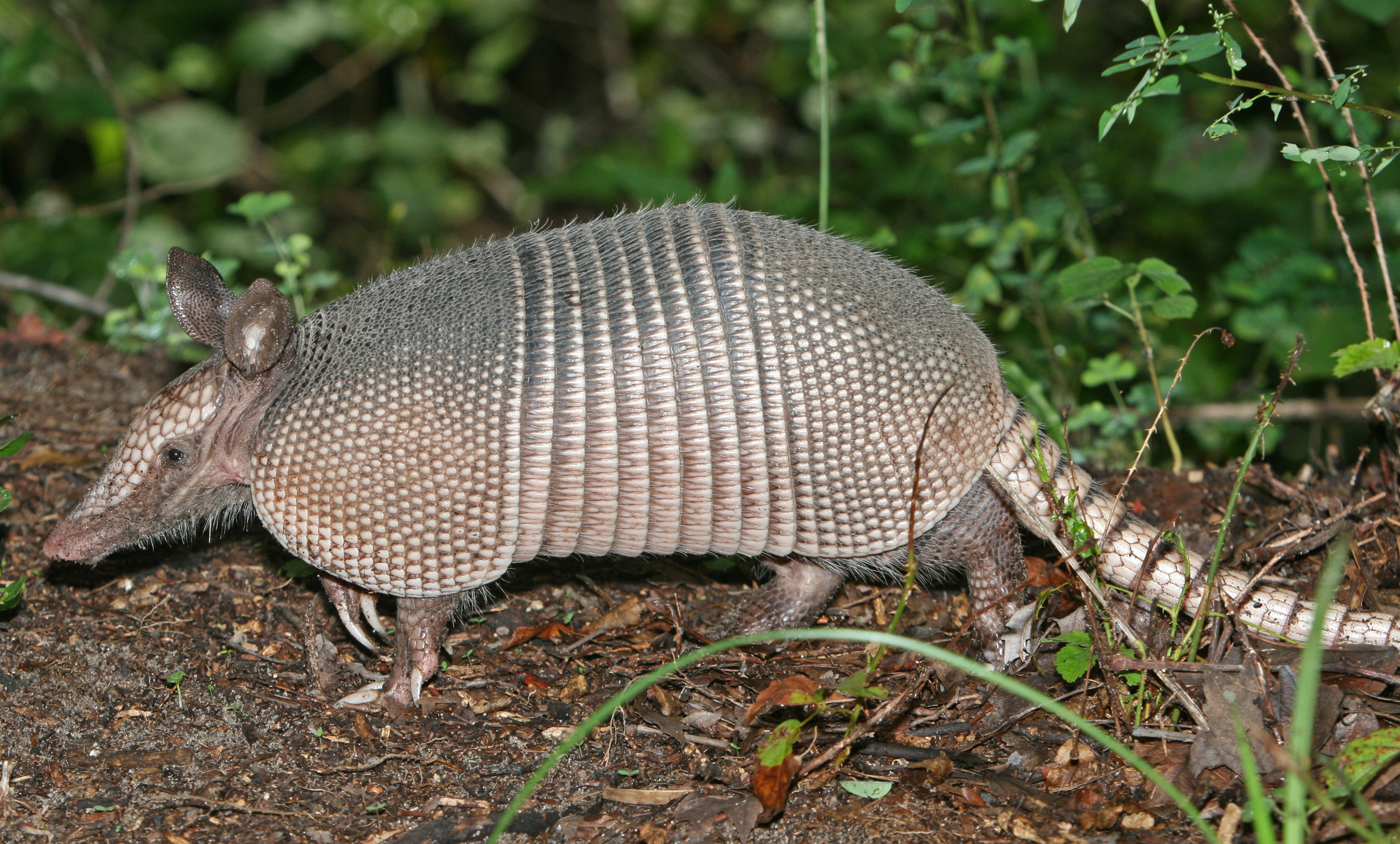
Nine-banded armadillo

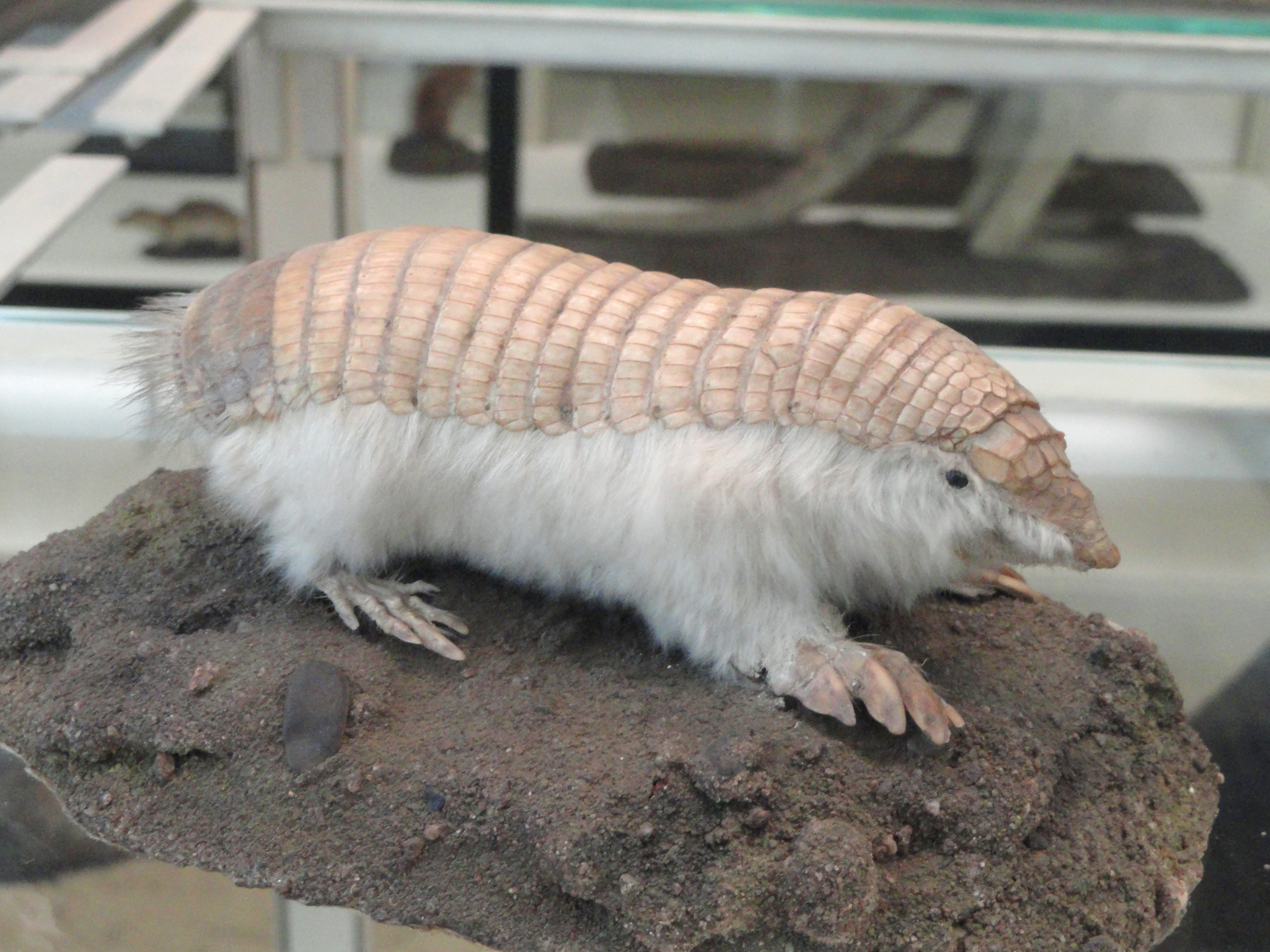
Pink fairy armadillo

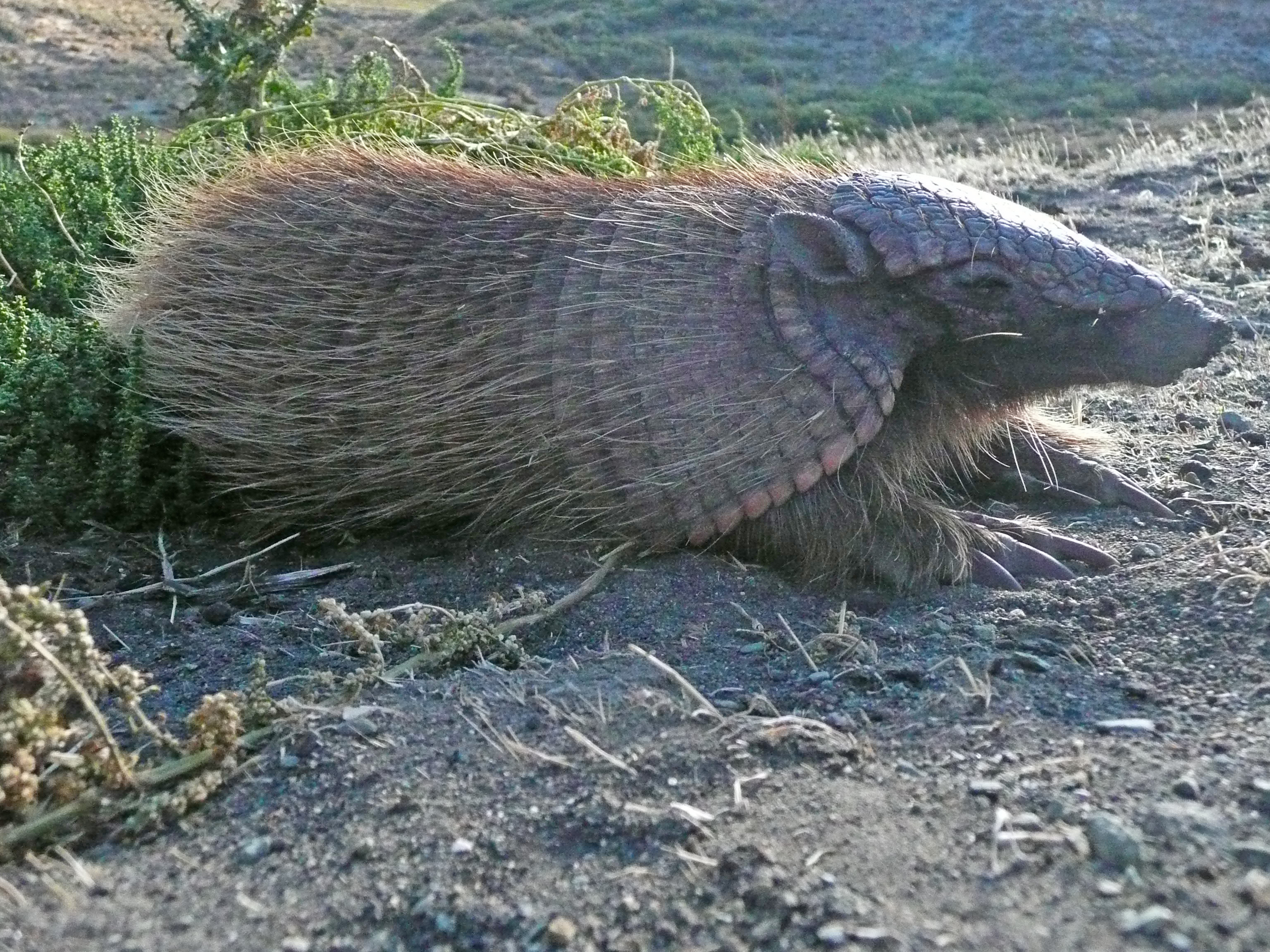
Screaming hairy armadillo

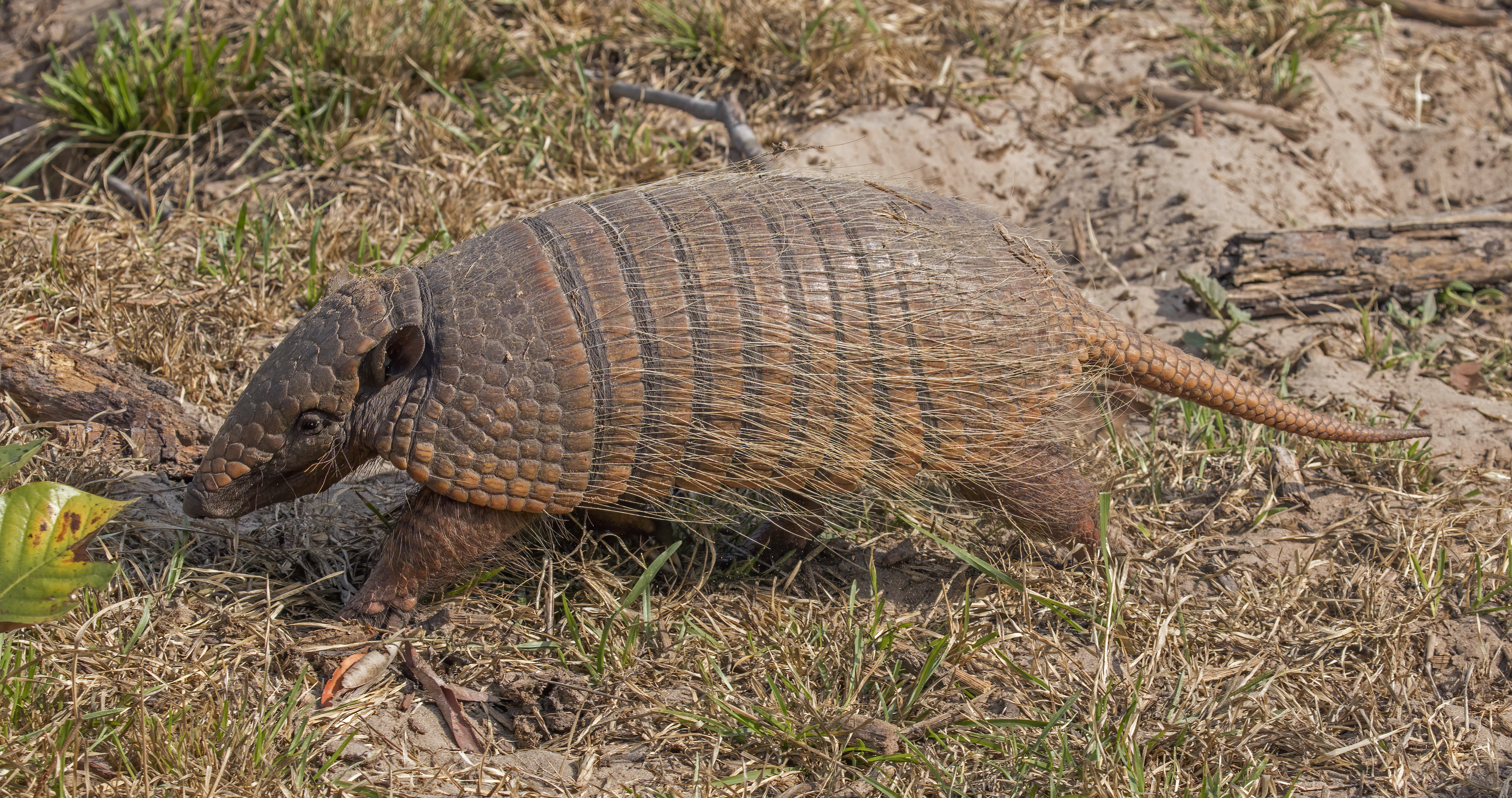
Six-banded armadillo

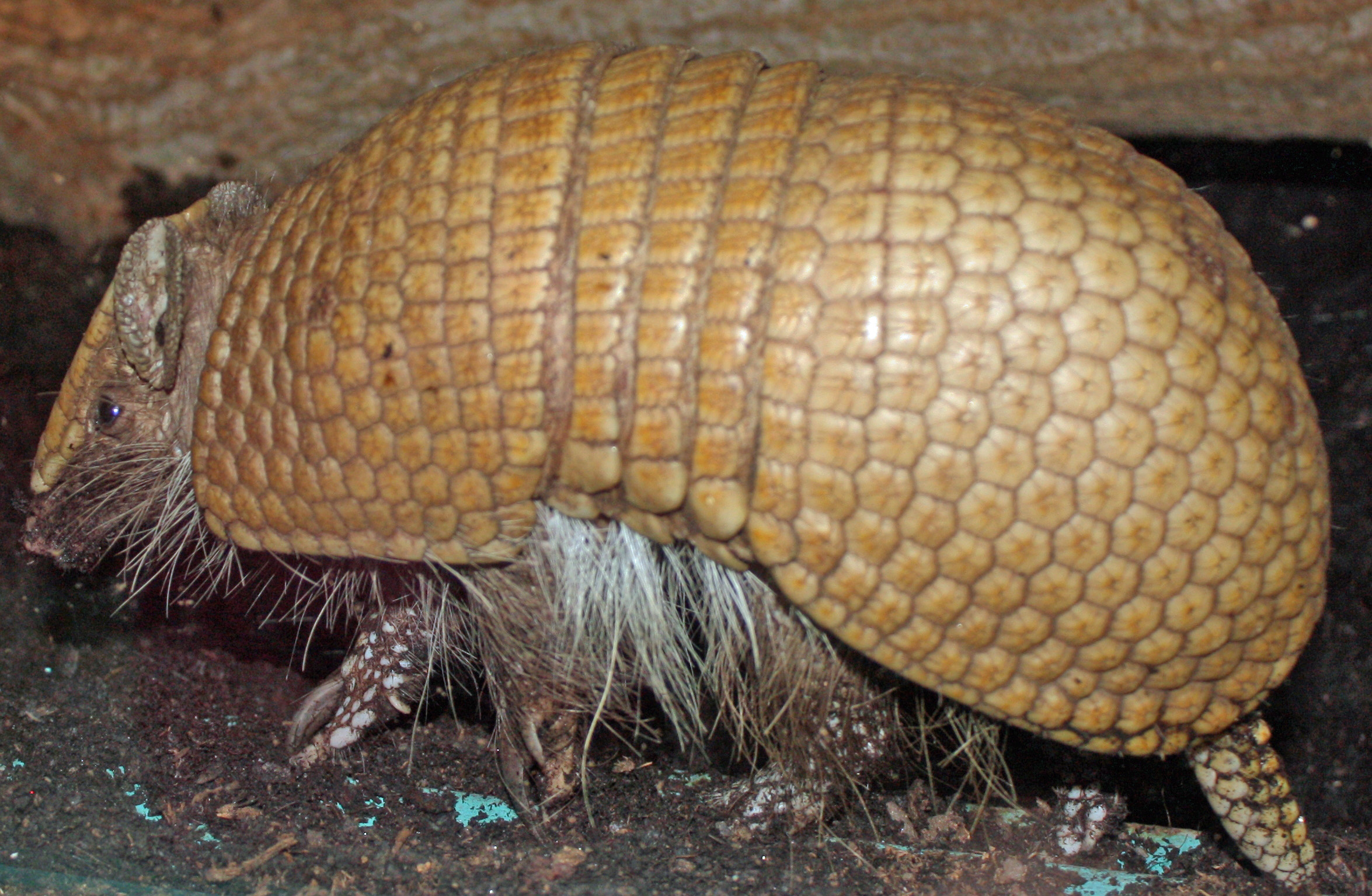
Southern three-banded armadillo

The armadillos are small mammals with a bony armored shell. All 21 extant species are found in South America, where they originated. Their much larger relatives, the pampatheres and glyptodonts, once lived in North and South America but became extinct following the appearance of humans.

- Family: Dasypodidae (long-nosed armadillos)
  - Subfamily: Dasypodinae
    - Genus: Dasypus
      - Southern long-nosed armadillo, Dasypus hybridus NT
      - Greater long-nosed armadillo, Dasypus kappleri LC
      - Nine-banded armadillo, Dasypus novemcinctus LC
      - Hairy long-nosed armadillo, Dasypus pilosus VU
      - Llanos long-nosed armadillo, Dasypus sabanicola LC
      - Seven-banded armadillo, Dasypus septemcinctus LC
      - Yepes's mulita, Dasypus yepesi DD
- Family: Chlamyphoridae (armadillos)
  - Subfamily Chlamyphorinae
    - Genus: Calyptophractus
      - Greater fairy armadillo, Calyptophractus retusus DD
    - Genus: Chlamyphorus
      - Pink fairy armadillo, Chlamyphorus truncatus DD
  - Subfamily: Euphractinae
    - Genus: Chaetophractus
      - Andean hairy armadillo, Chaetophractus nationi VU
      - Screaming hairy armadillo, Chaetophractus vellerosus LC
      - Big hairy armadillo, Chaetophractus villosus LC
    - Genus: Euphractus
      - Six-banded armadillo, Euphractus sexcinctus LC
    - Genus: Zaedyus
      - Pichi, Zaedyus pichiy NT
  - Subfamily: Tolypeutinae
    - Genus: Cabassous
      - Northern naked-tailed armadillo, Cabassous centralis DD
      - Chacoan naked-tailed armadillo, Cabassous chacoensis NT
      - Greater naked-tailed armadillo, Cabassous tatouay LC
      - Southern naked-tailed armadillo, Cabassous unicinctus LC
    - Genus: Priodontes
      - Giant armadillo, Priodontes maximus VU
    - Genus: Tolypeutes
      - Southern three-banded armadillo, Tolypeutes matacus NT
      - Brazilian three-banded armadillo, Tolypeutes tricinctus VU

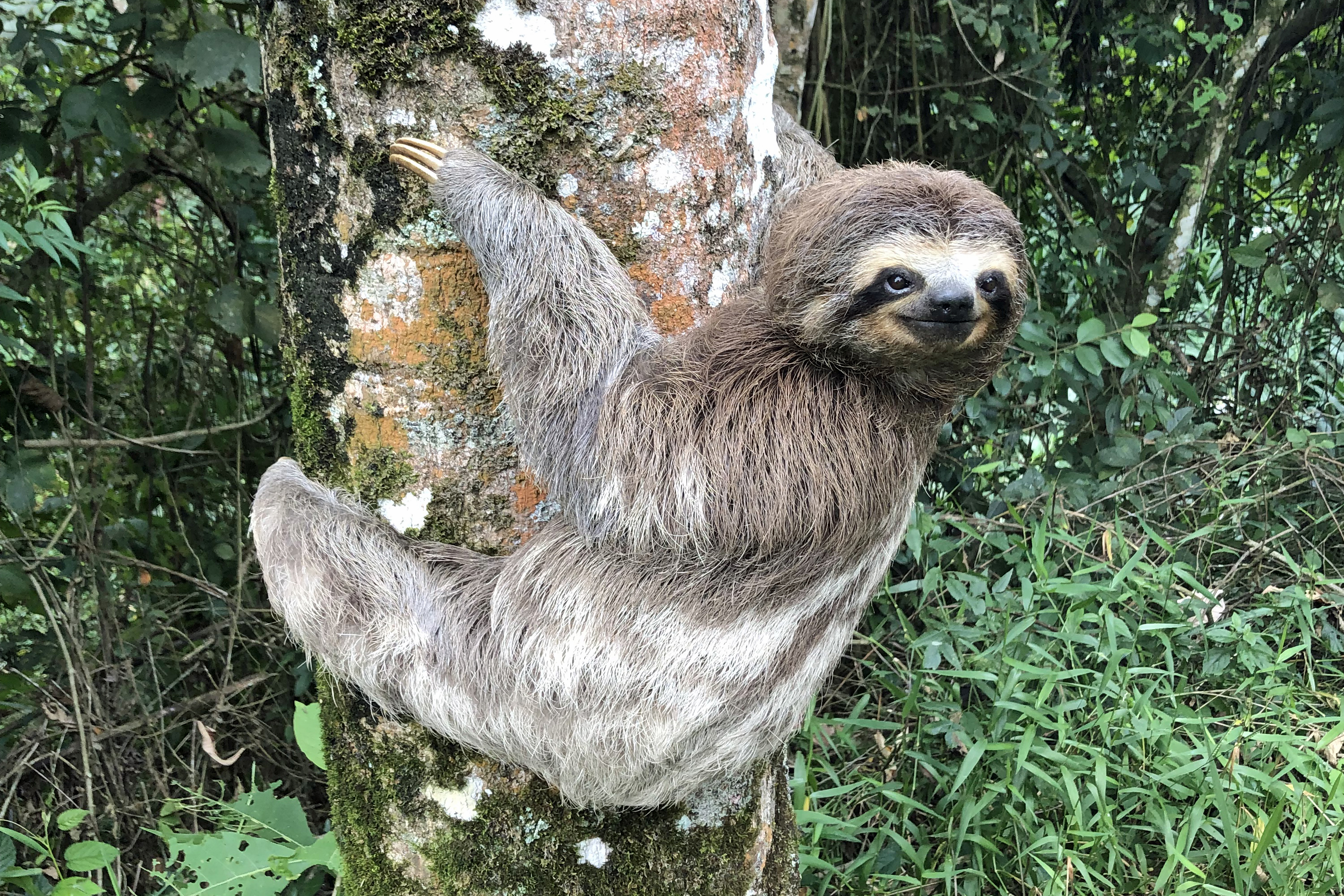
Brown-throated sloth

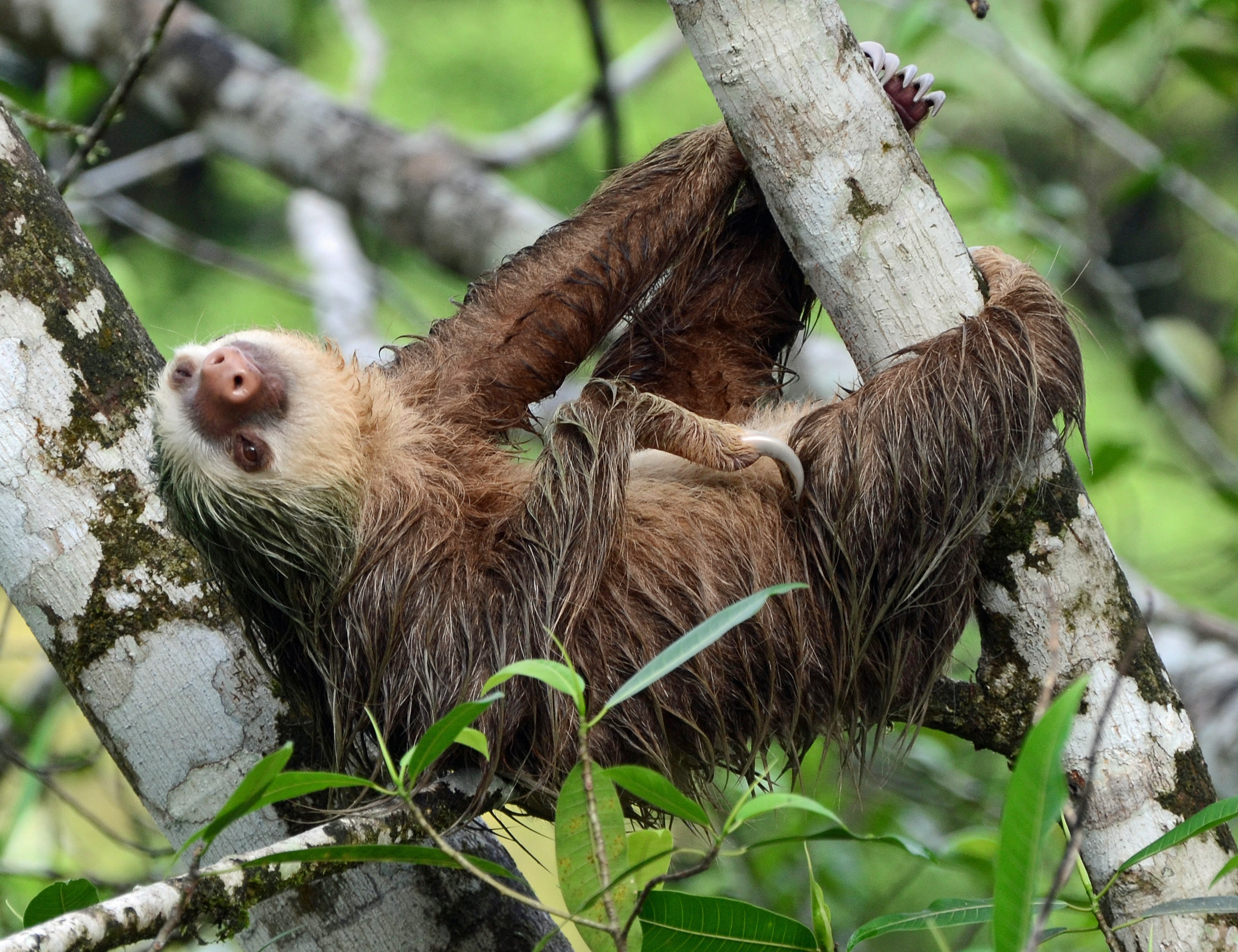
Hoffmann's two-toed sloth

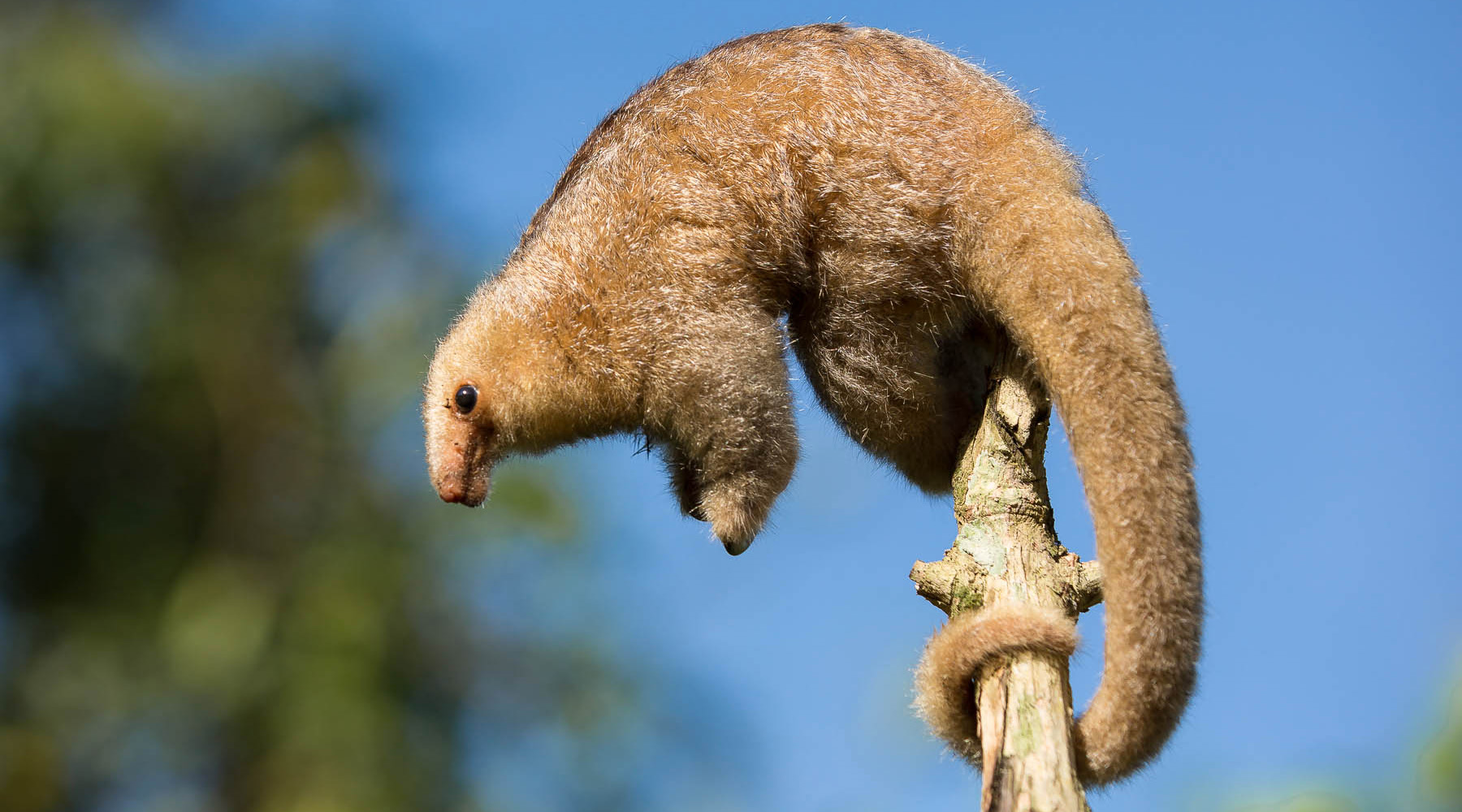
Silky anteater

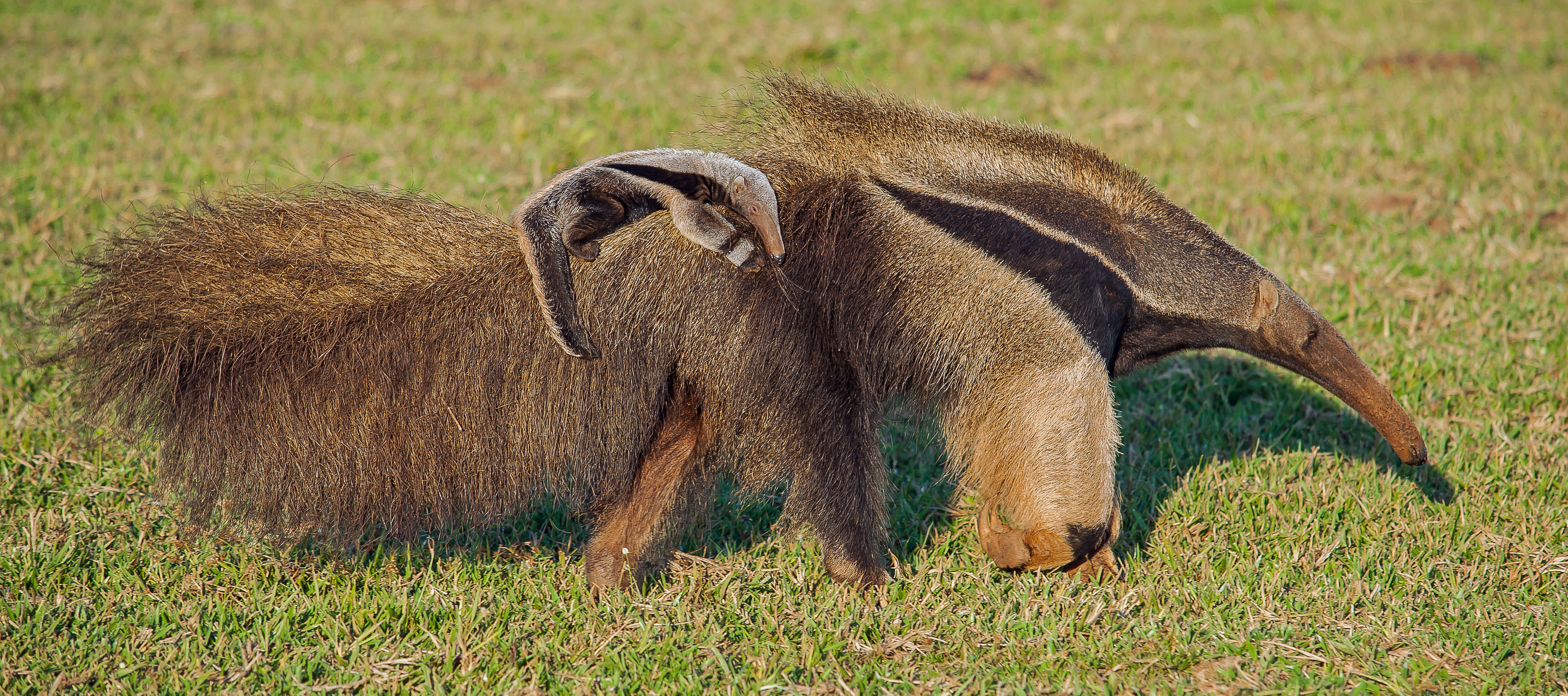
Giant anteater

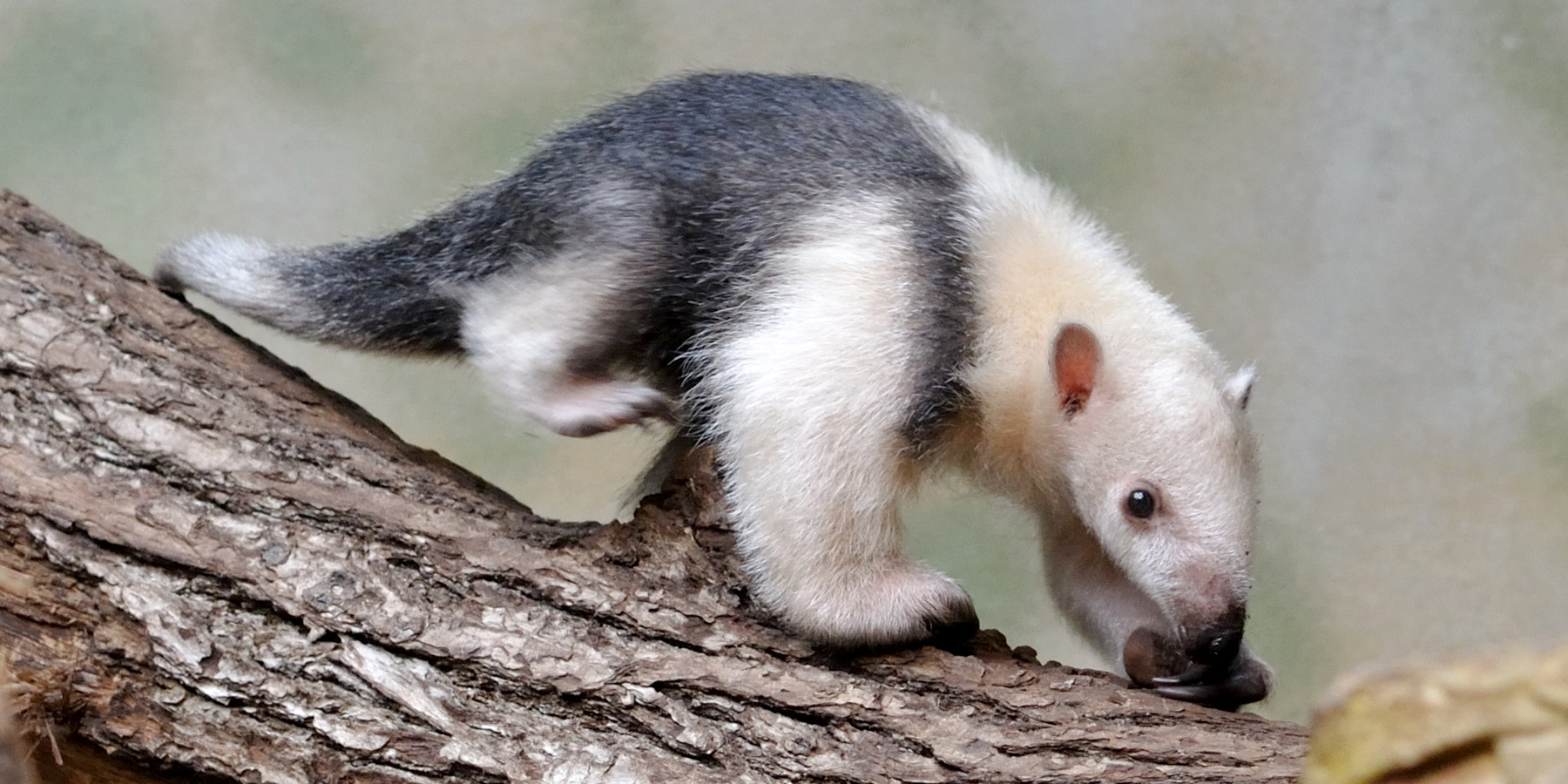
Southern tamandua

===== Order: Pilosa (sloths and anteaters) =====
The order Pilosa is confined to the Americas and contains the tree sloths and anteaters (which include the tamanduas). All 5 extant genera and 9 of 10 extant species are present in South America, the ancestral home of the group. (The exception is the pygmy three-toed sloth, endemic to an island off Panama.) Numerous ground sloths, some of which reached the size of elephants, were once present in both North and South America, as well as on the Antilles. (Some west coastal South American forms had even evolved into marine sloths.) All of these went extinct following the arrival of humans. Extant tree sloths fall into two groups that are not closely related, and which do not form a clade; two-toed sloths are much more closely related to some extinct ground sloths than to three-toed sloths.

- Suborder: Folivora
  - Family: Bradypodidae (three-toed sloths)
    - Genus: Bradypus
      - Maned sloth, Bradypus torquatus VU
      - Pale-throated sloth, Bradypus tridactylus LC
      - Brown-throated sloth, Bradypus variegatus LC
  - Family: Choloepodidae (two-toed sloths)
    - Genus: Choloepus
      - Linnaeus's two-toed sloth, Choloepus didactylus LC
      - Hoffmann's two-toed sloth, Choloepus hoffmanni LC
- Suborder: Vermilingua
  - Family: Cyclopedidae
    - Genus: Cyclopes (silky anteaters)
      - Cyclopes catellus NE
      - Cyclopes didactylus LC
      - Cyclopes dorsalis NE
      - Cyclopes ida NE
      - Cyclopes rufus NE
      - Cyclopes thomasi NE
      - Cyclopes xinguensis NE
  - Family: Myrmecophagidae (American anteaters)
    - Genus: Myrmecophaga
      - Giant anteater, Myrmecophaga tridactyla VU
    - Genus: Tamandua
      - Northern tamandua, Tamandua mexicana LC
      - Southern tamandua, Tamandua tetradactyla LC

==== Superorder: Euarchontoglires ====
===== Order: Primates =====
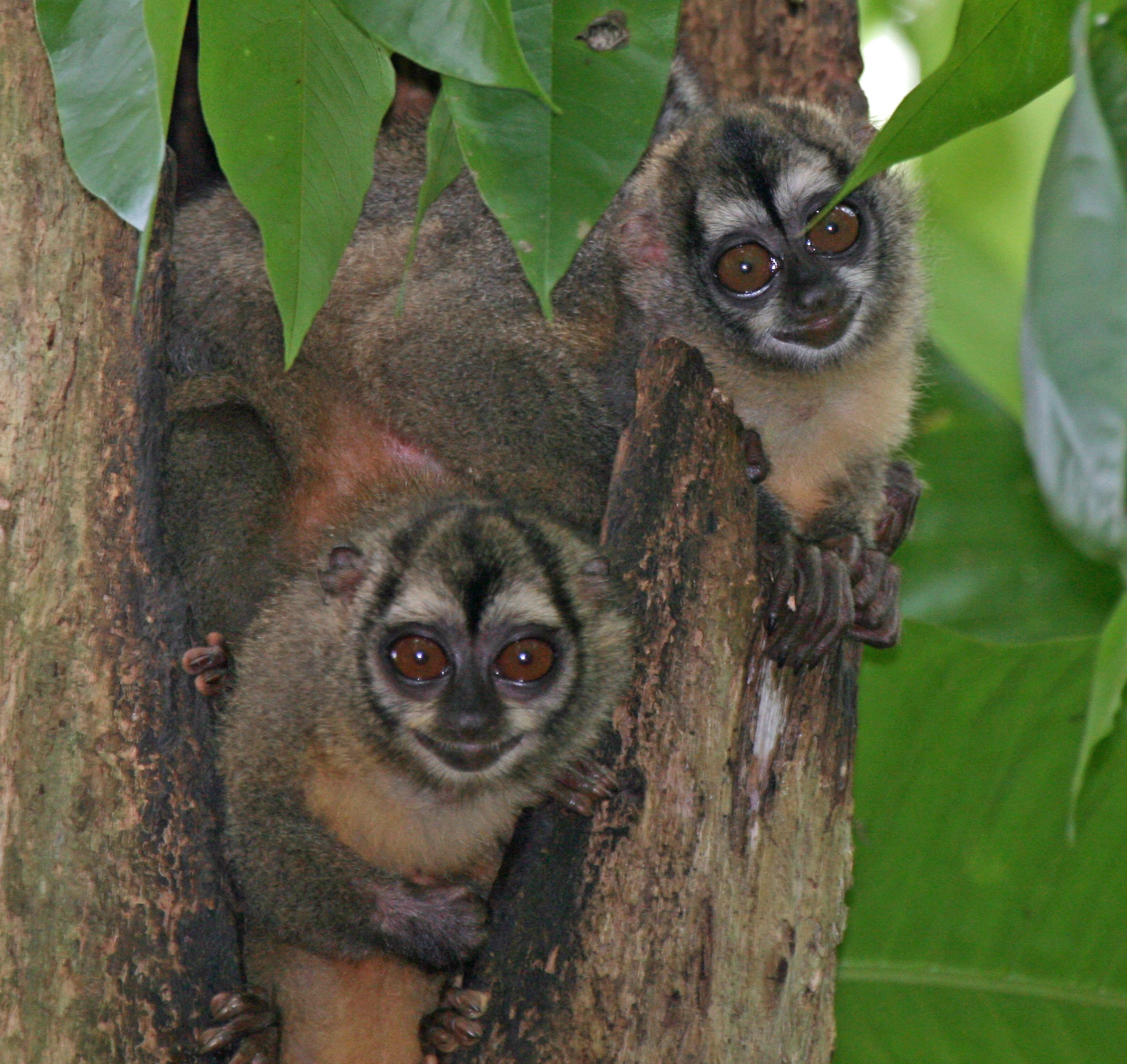
Panamanian night monkeys

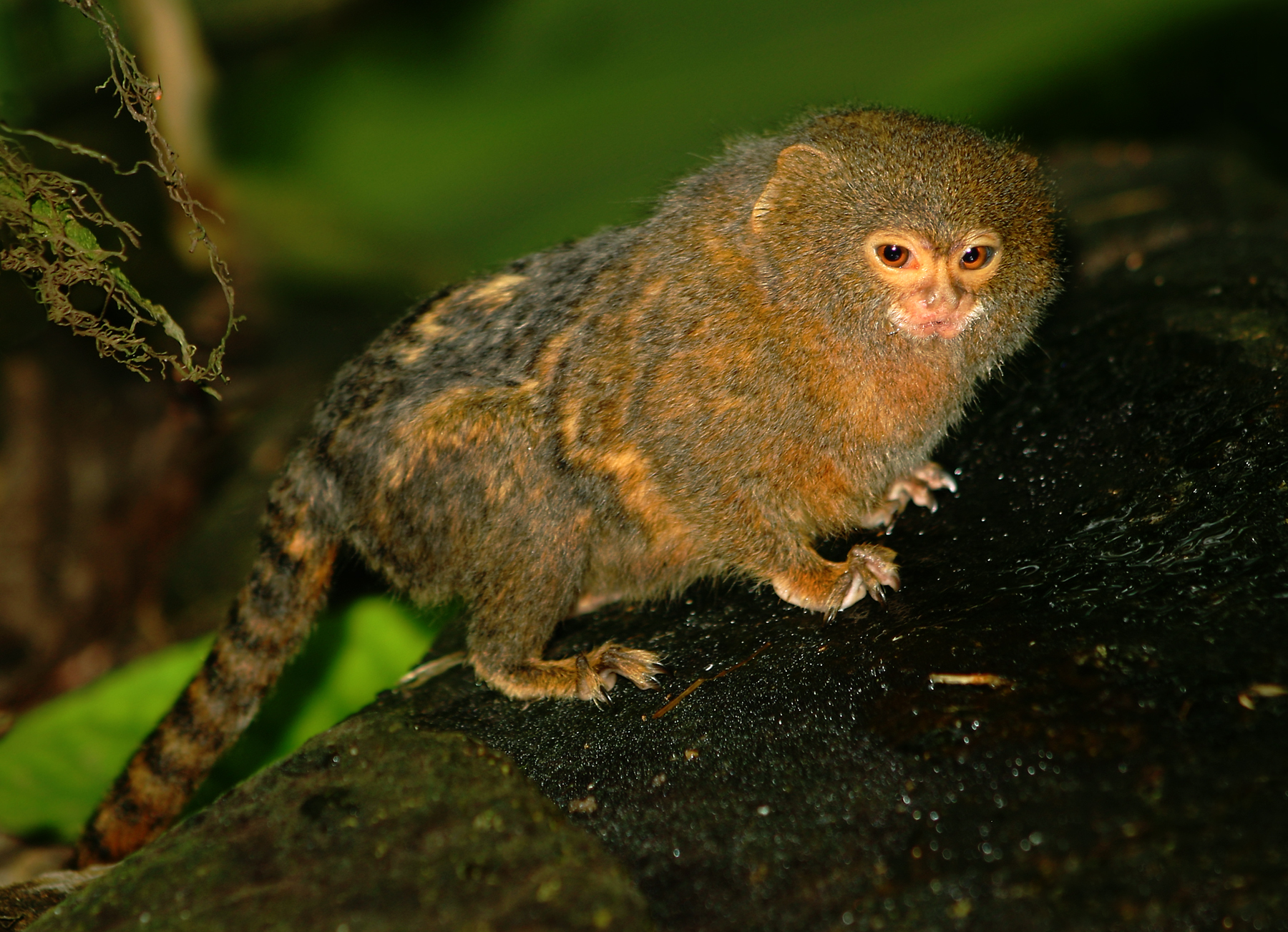
Pygmy marmoset

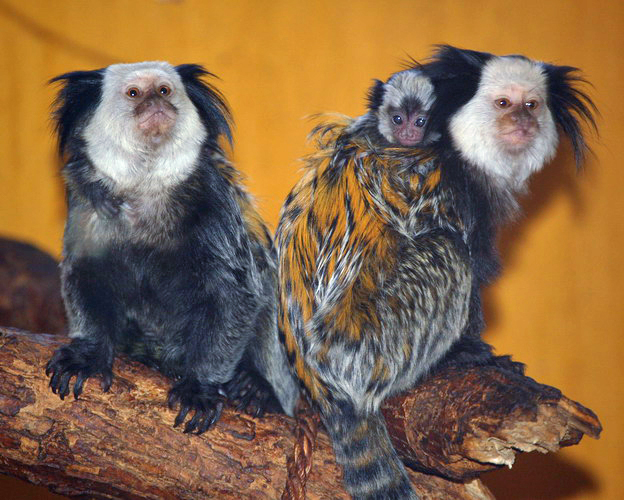
White-headed marmosets

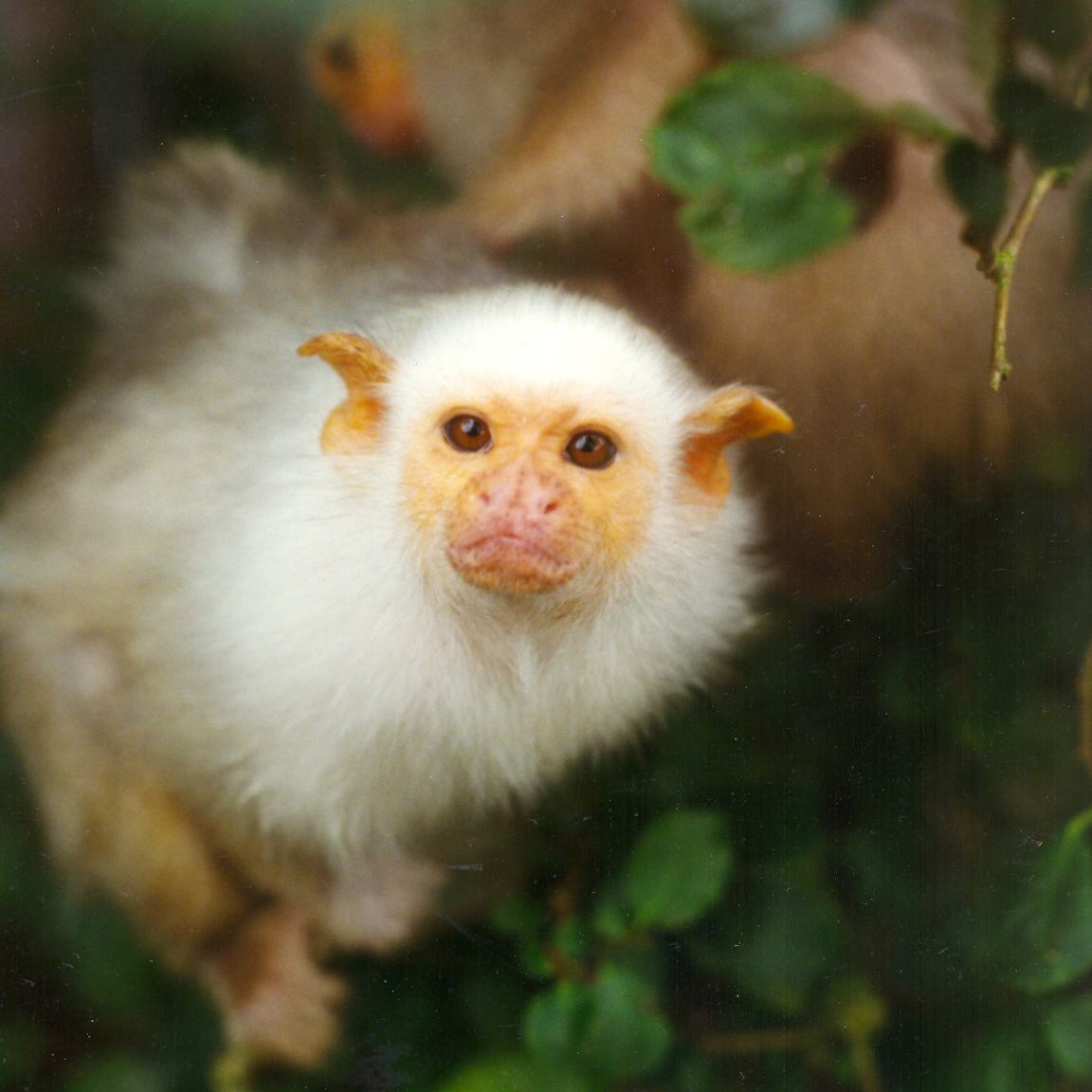
Silvery marmoset

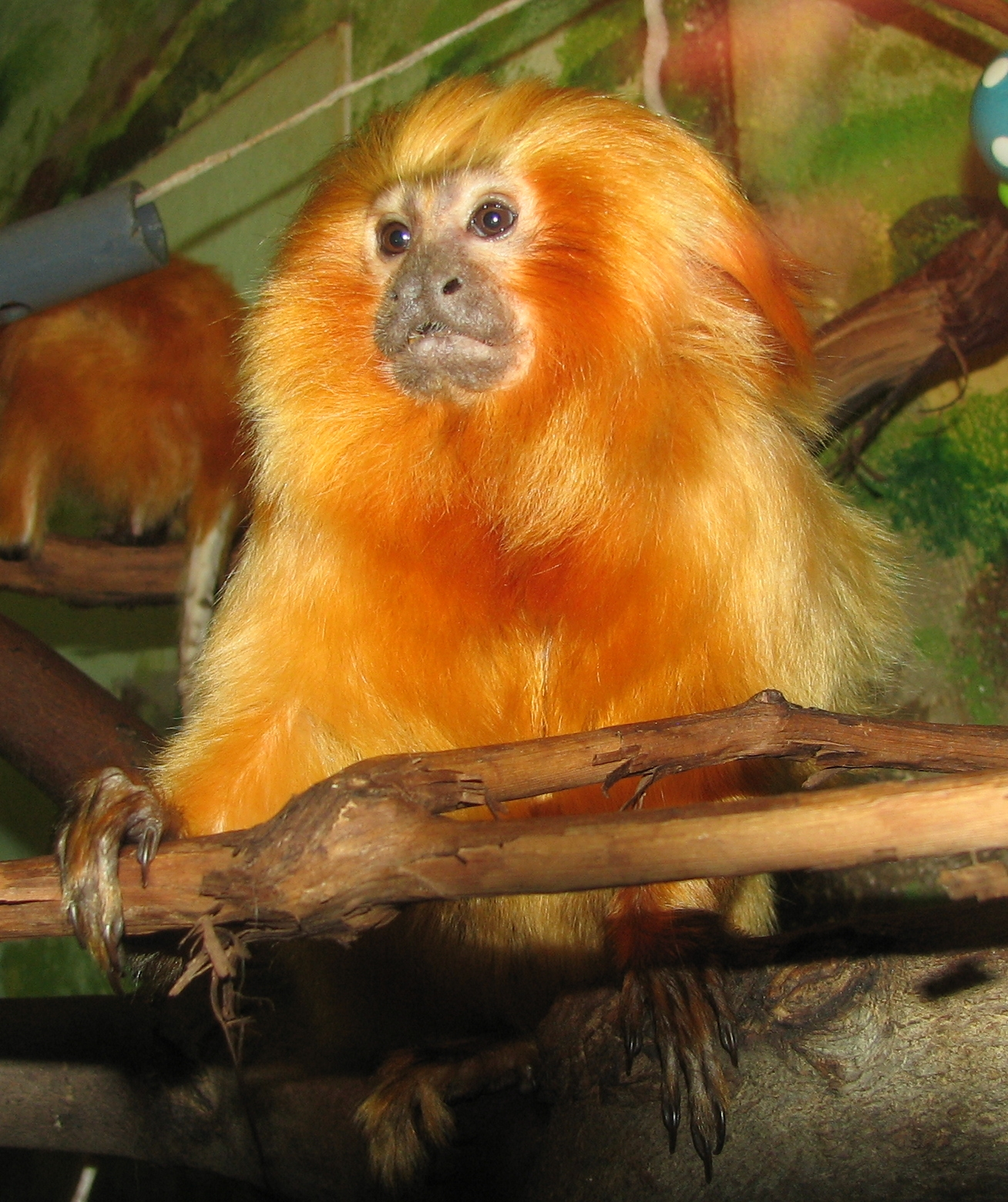
Golden lion tamarin

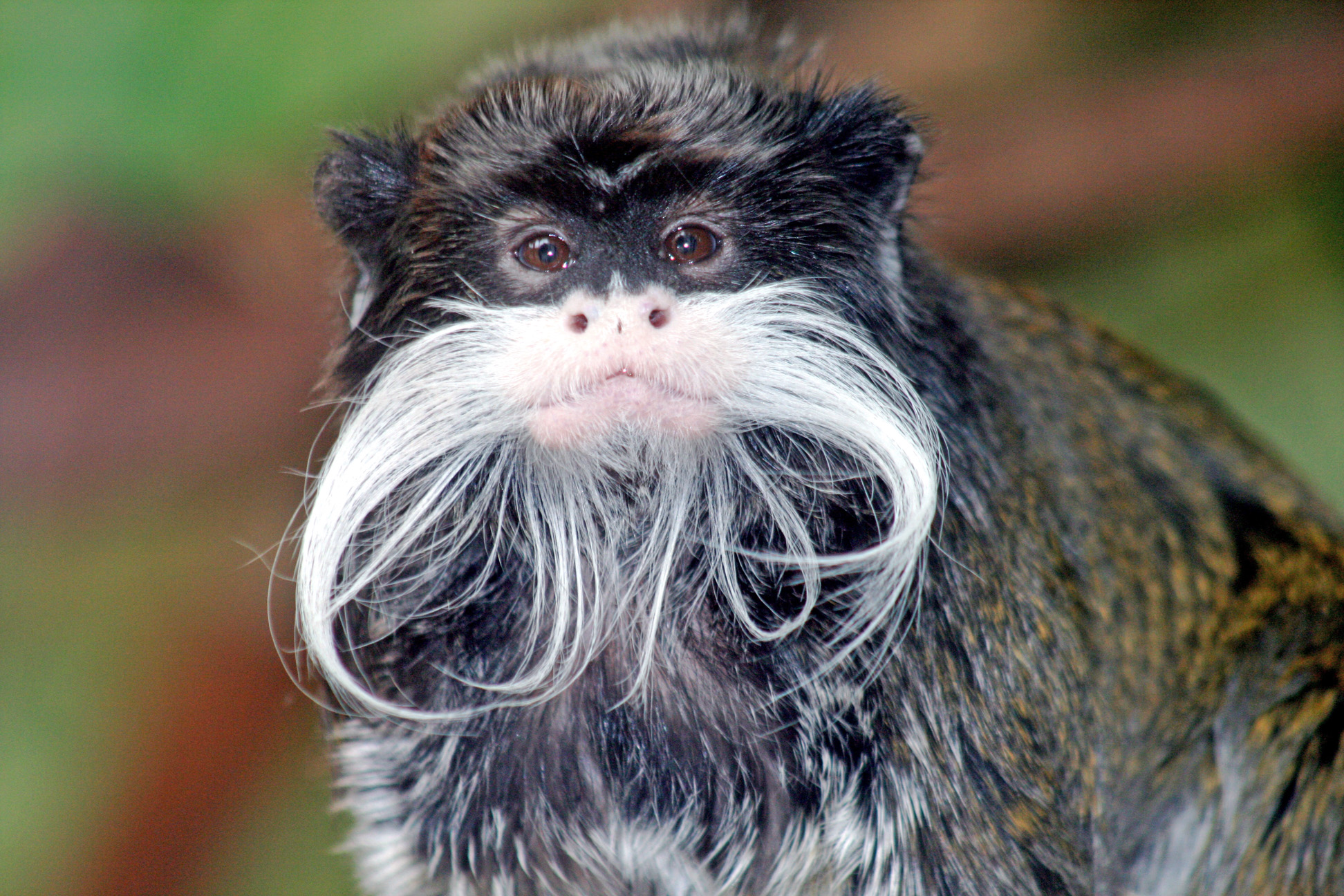
Emperor tamarin

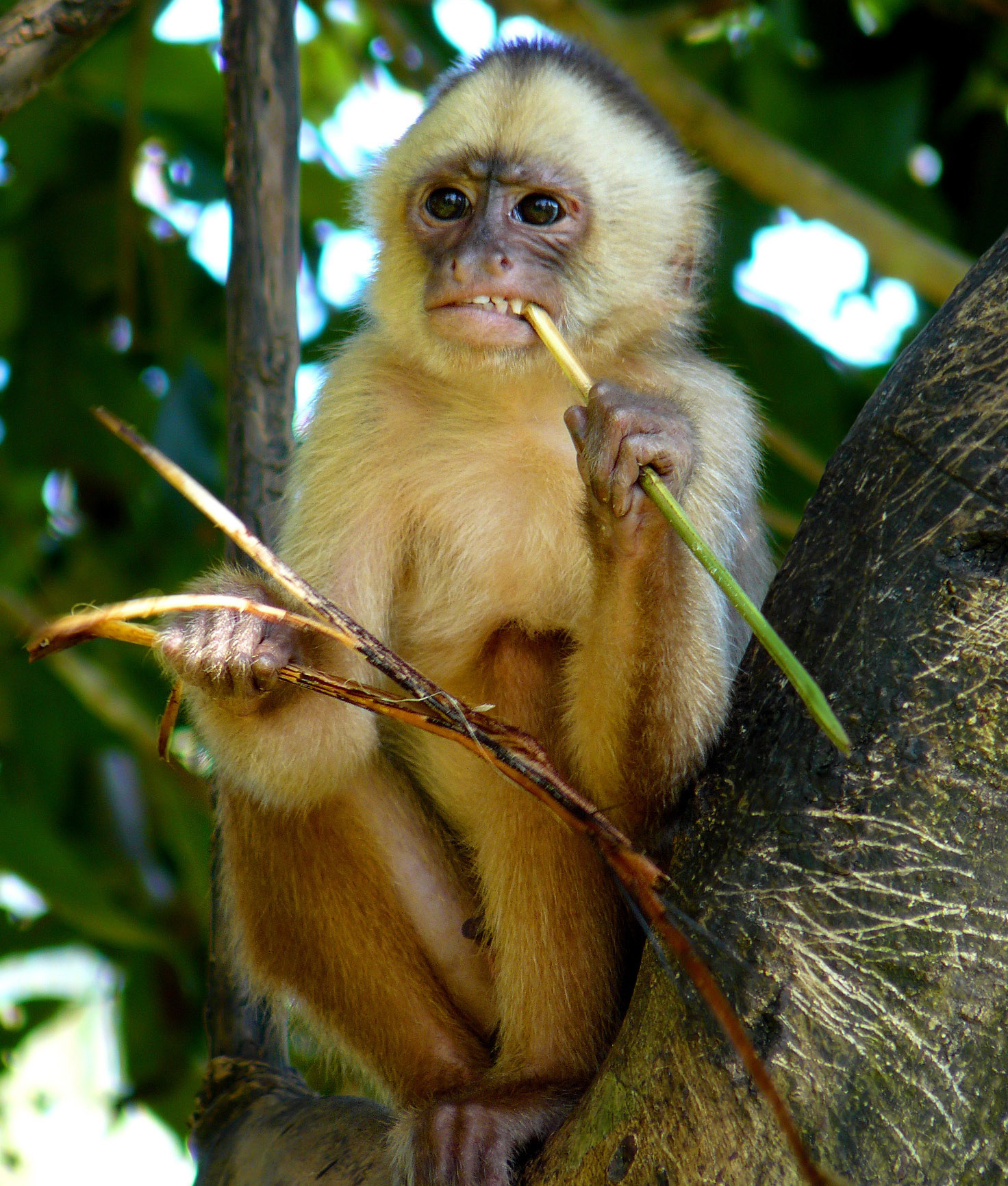
White-fronted capuchin

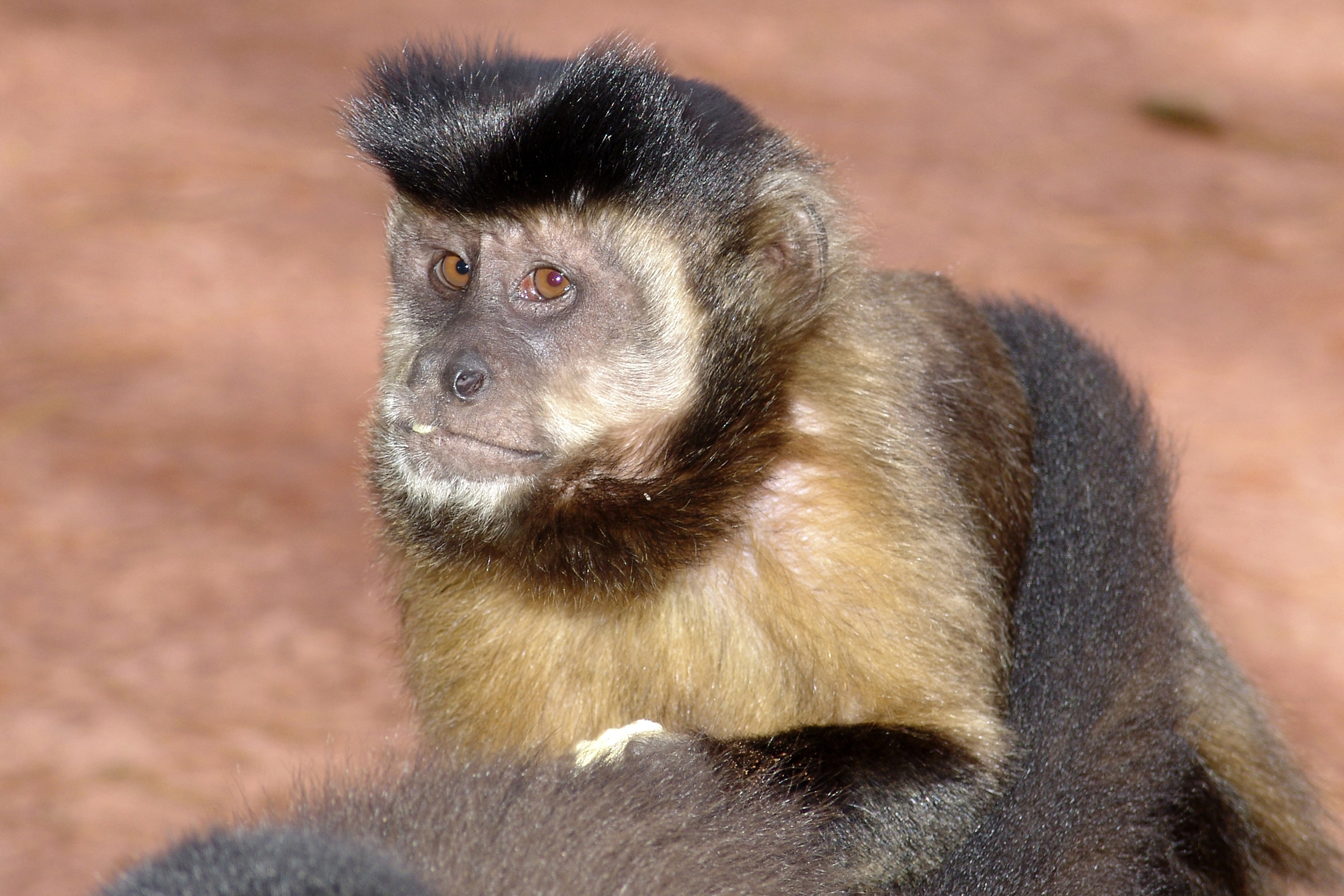
Black capuchin

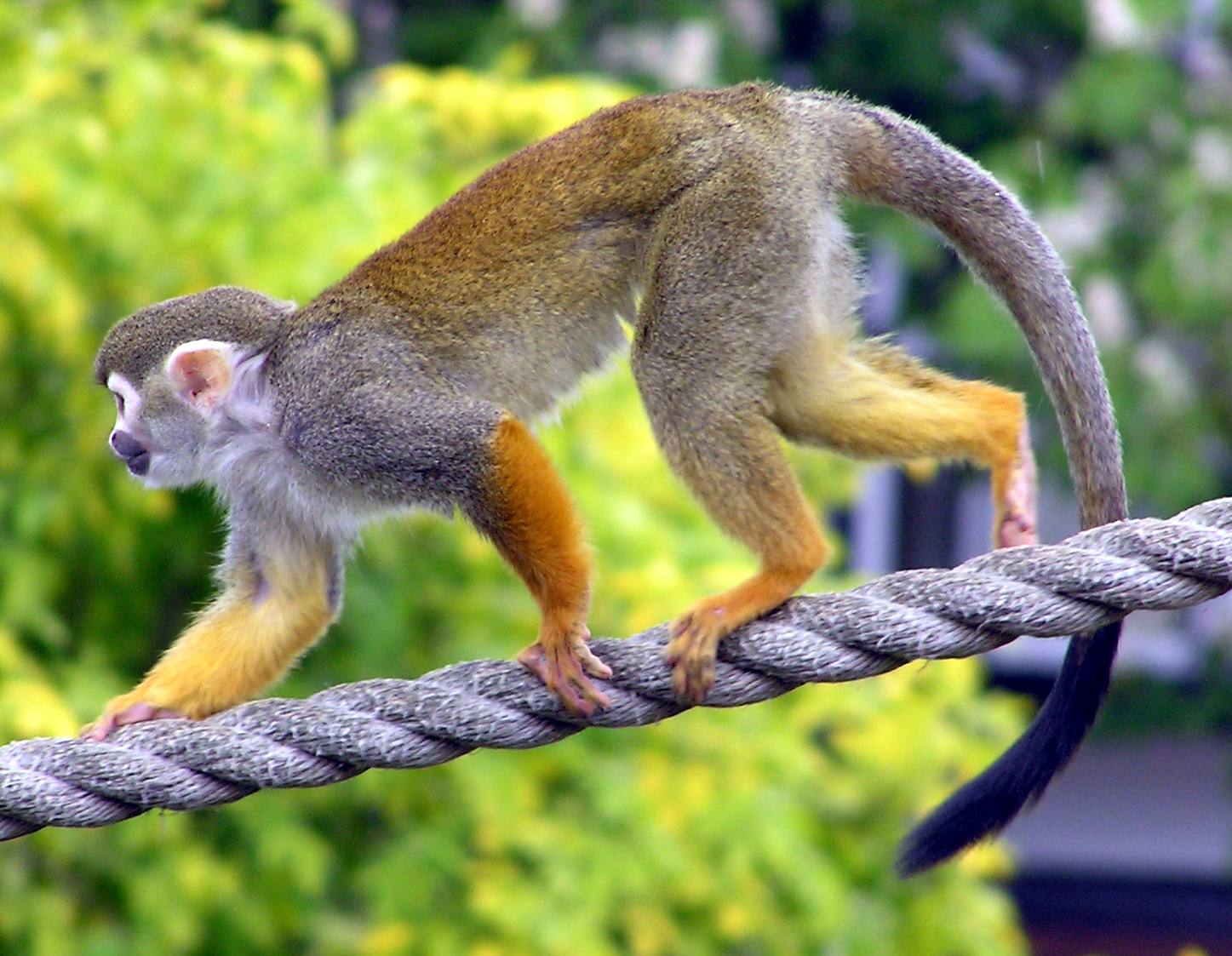
Common squirrel monkey

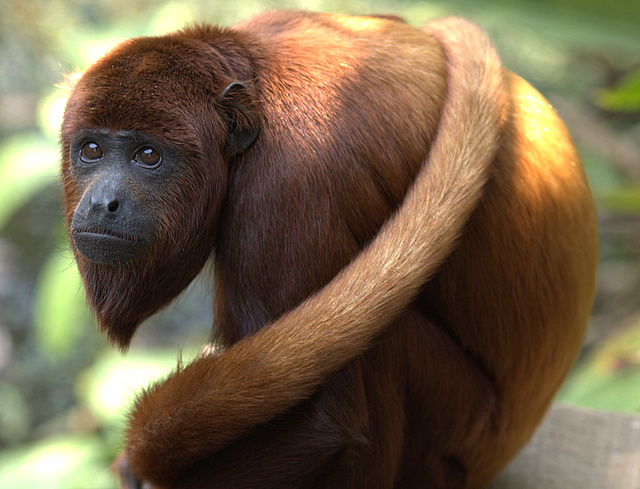
Venezuelan red howler

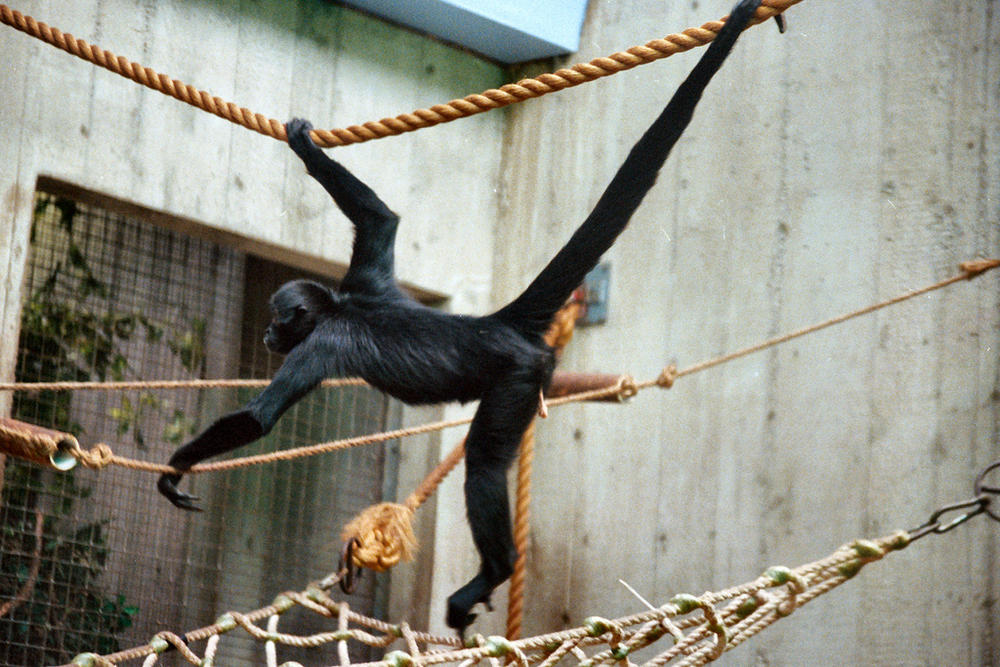
Black-headed spider monkey

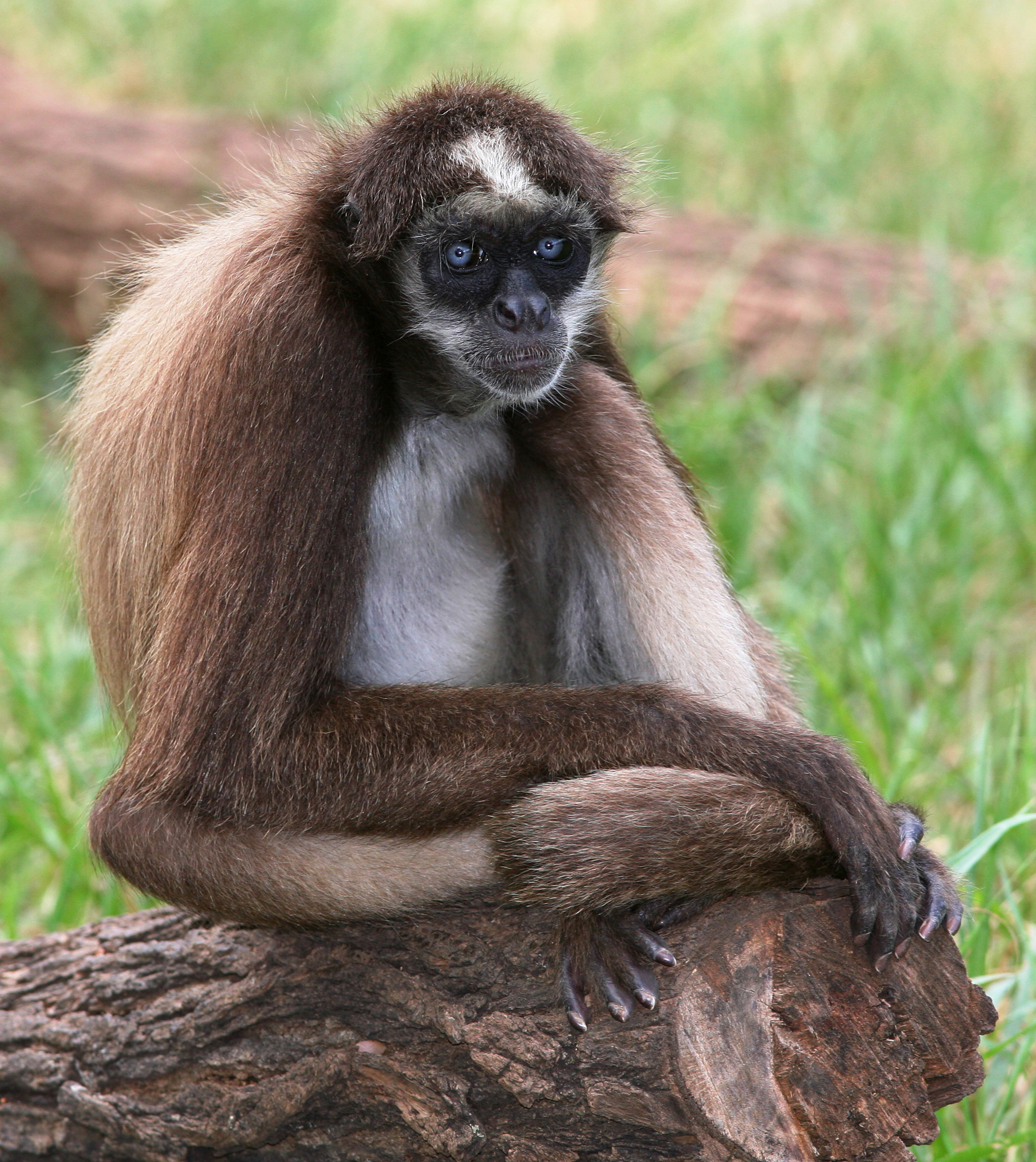
Brown spider monkey

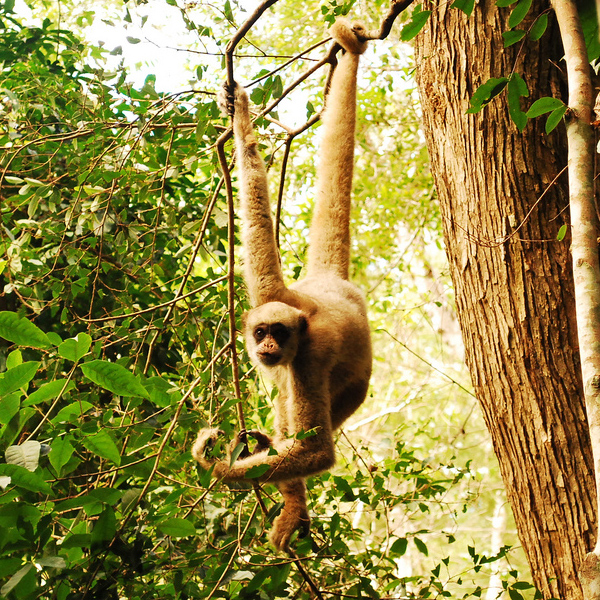
Northern muriqui

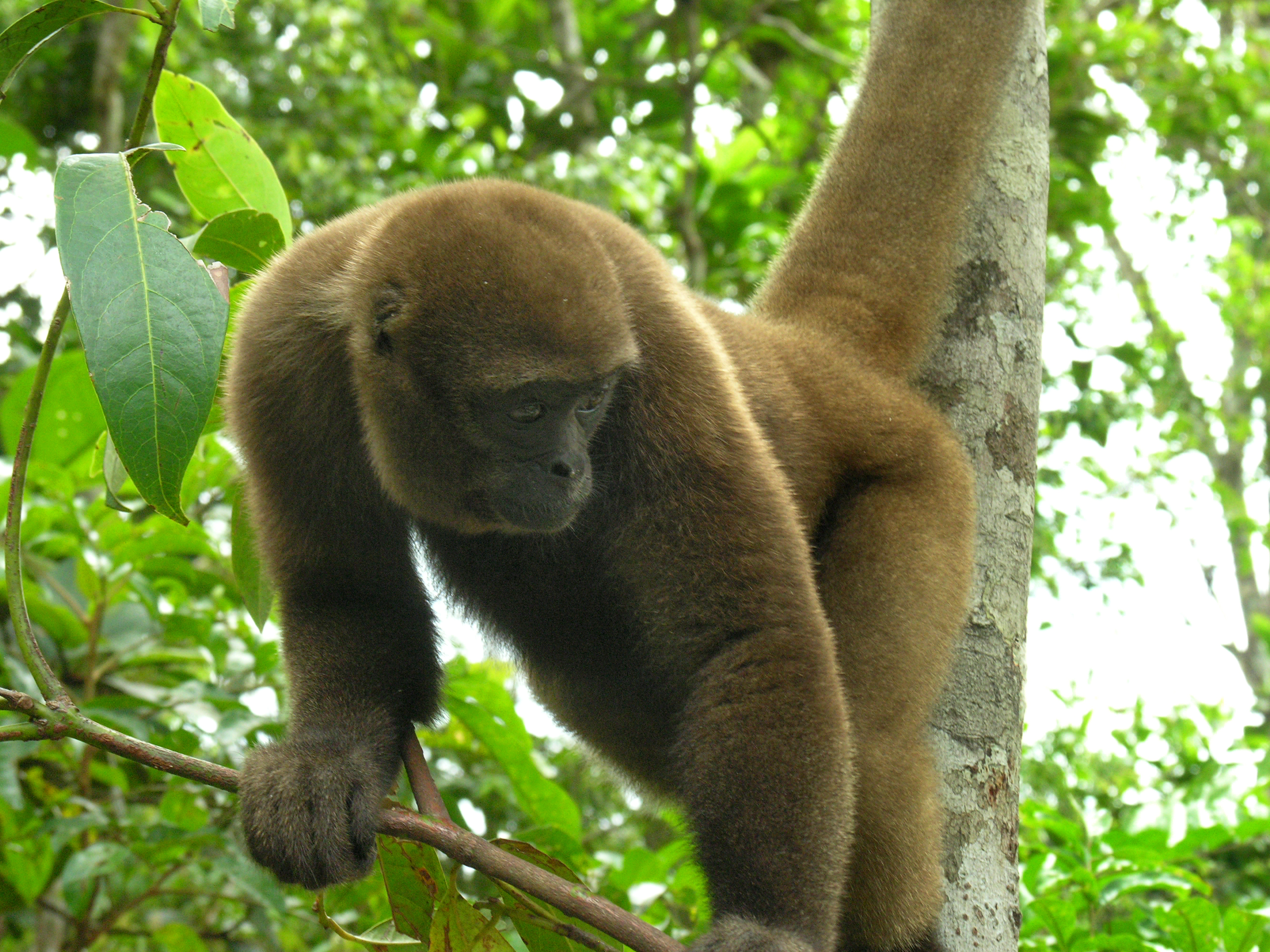
Brown woolly monkey

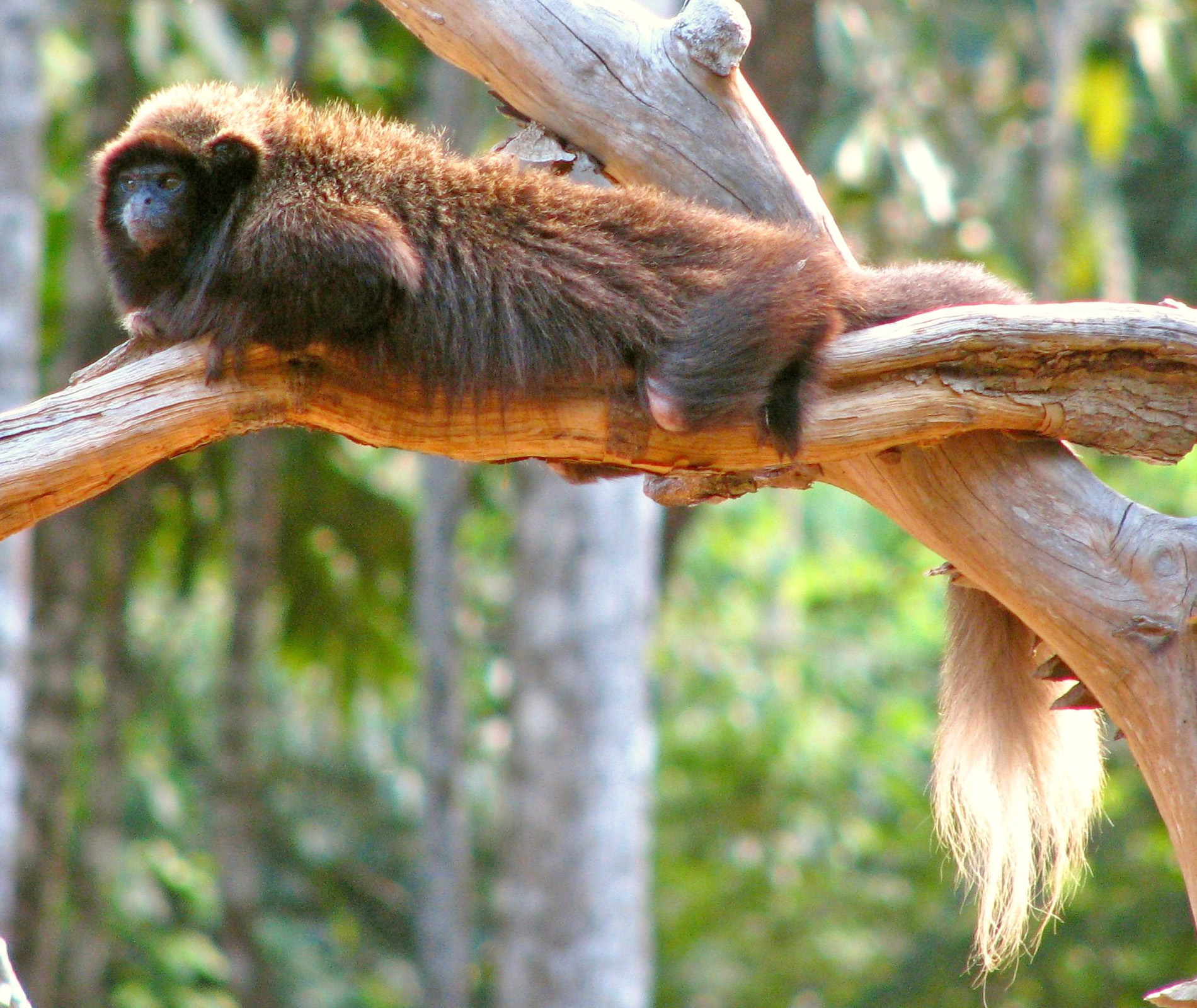
Black-fronted titi

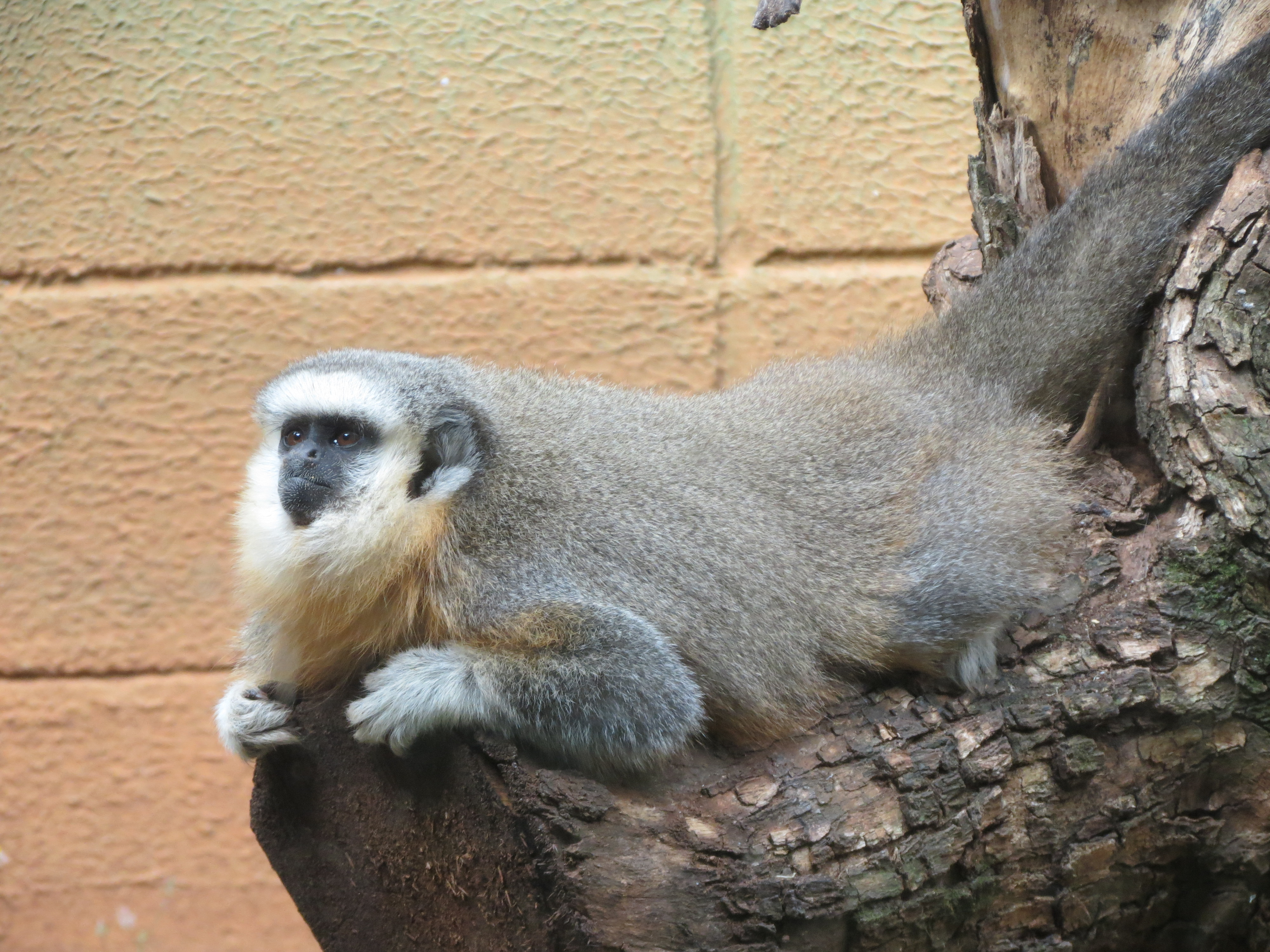
Vieira's titi

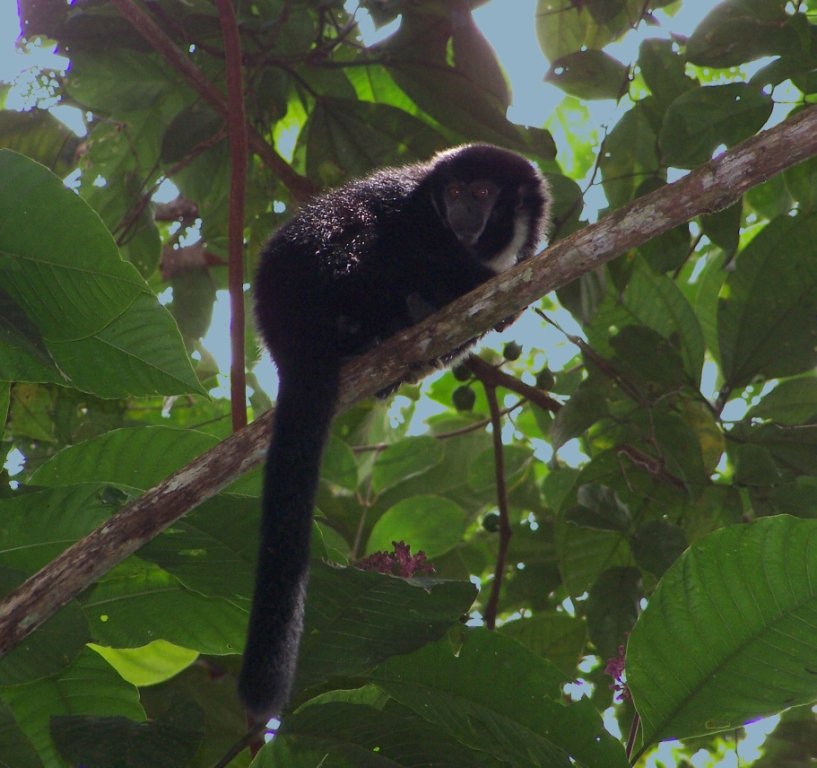
Black titi

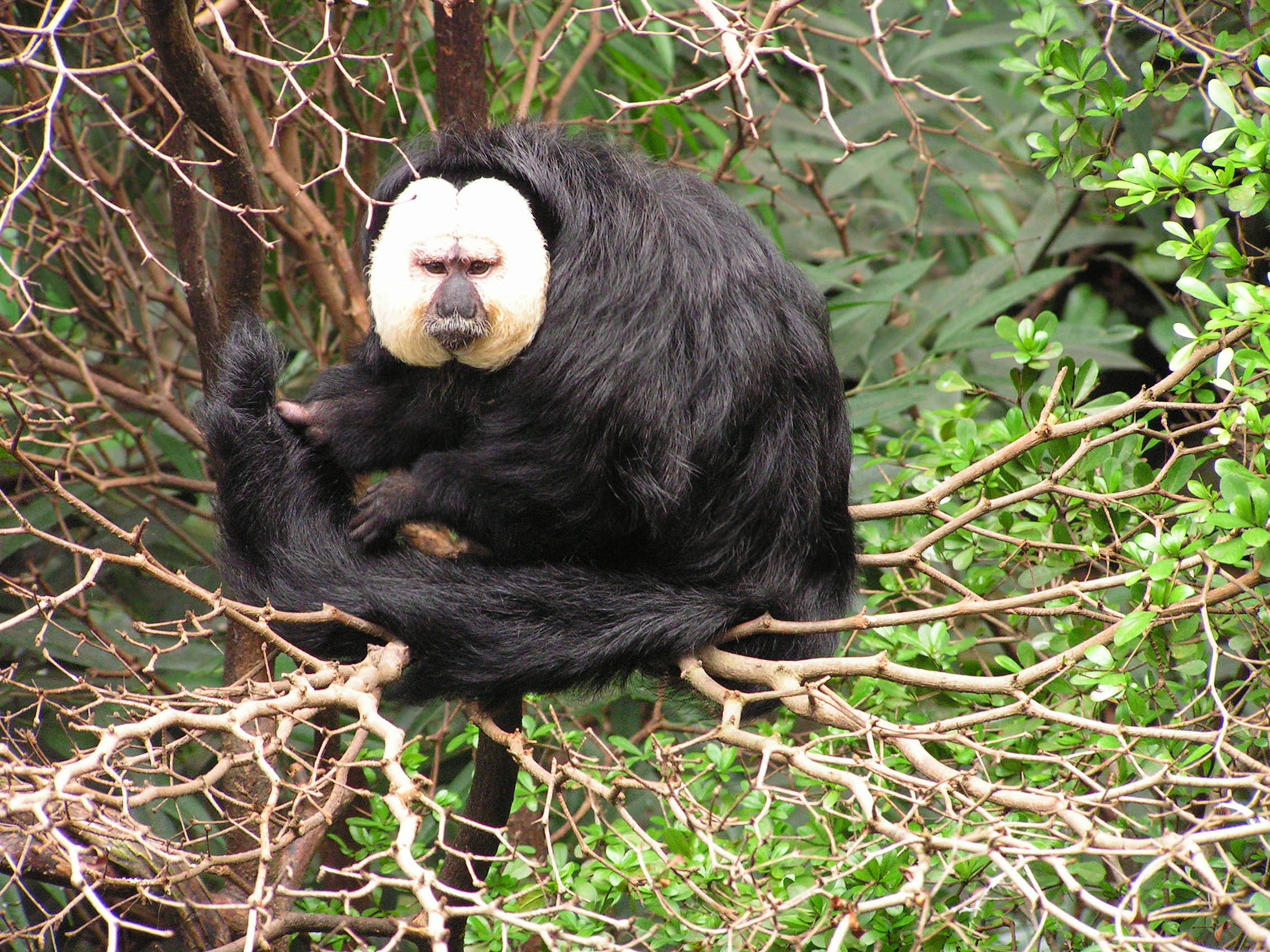
White-faced saki (male)

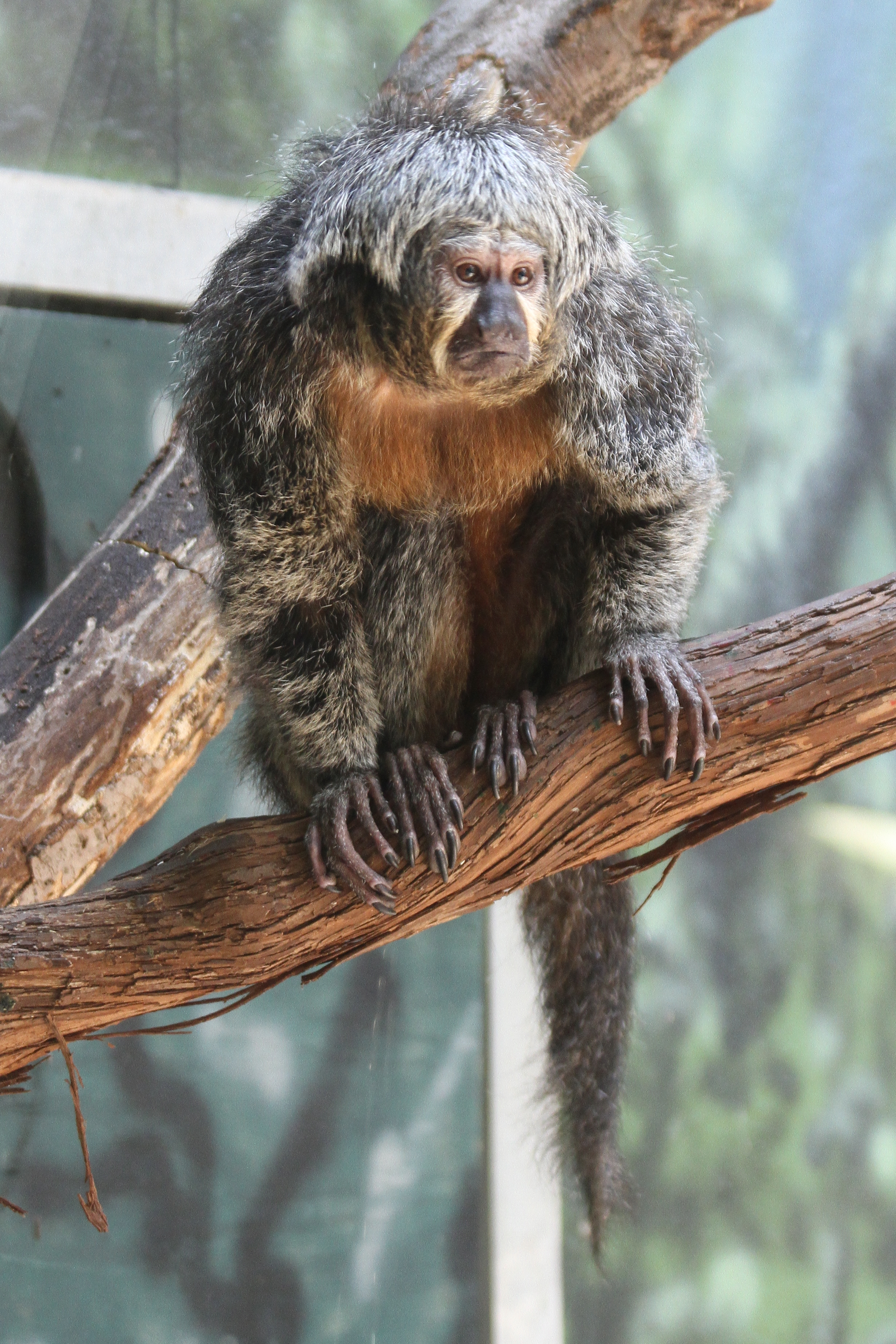
White-faced saki (female)

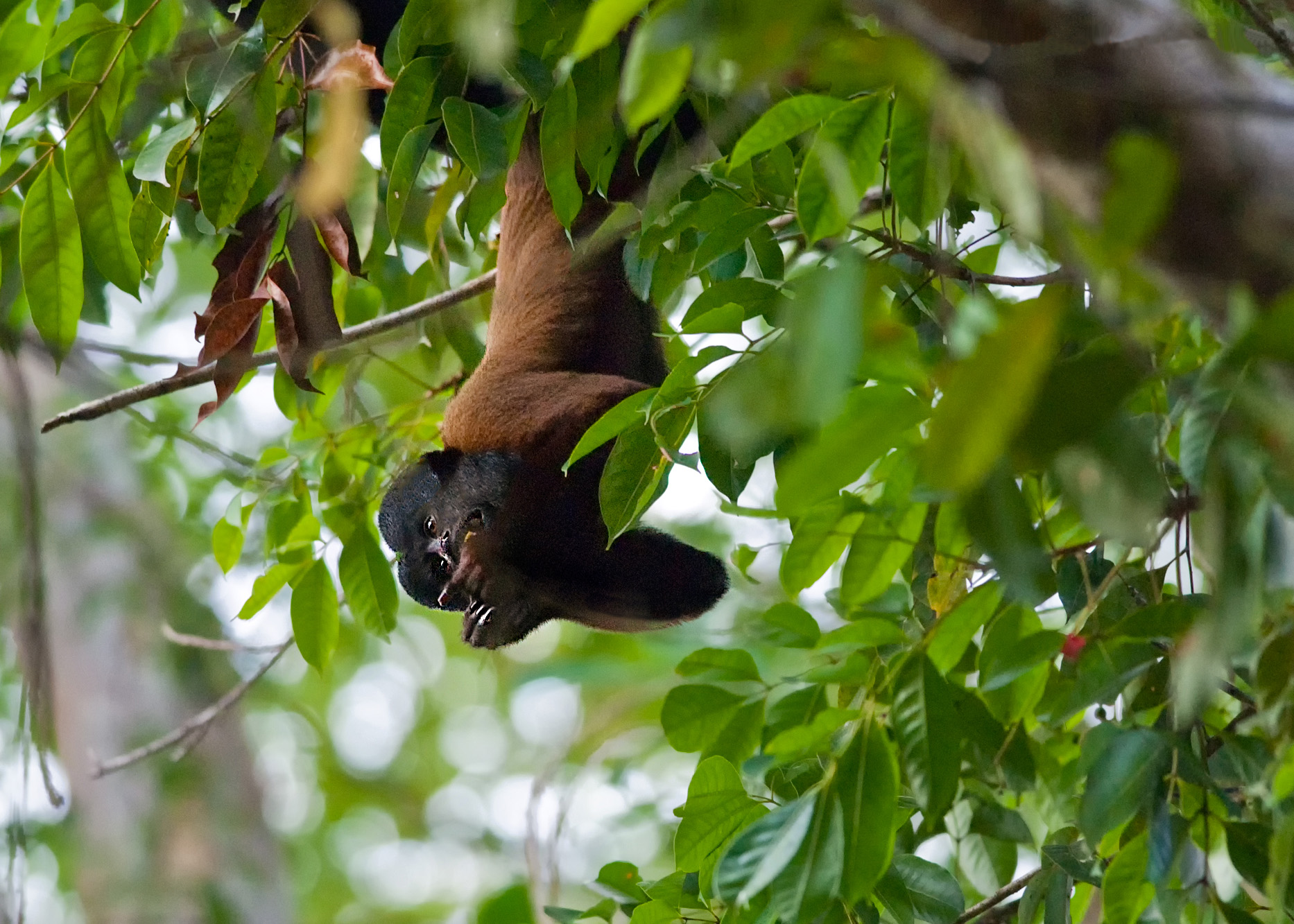
Red-backed bearded saki

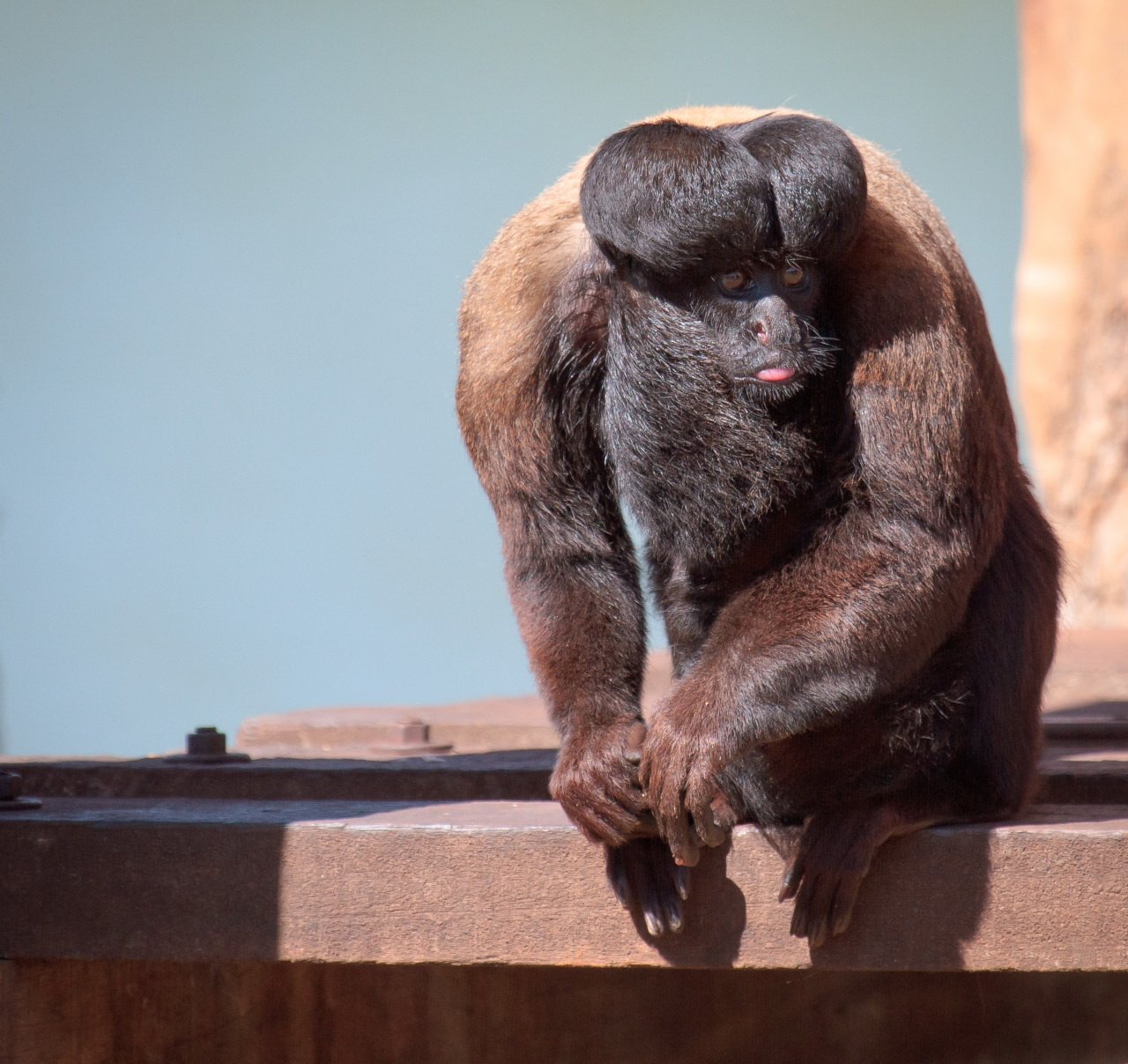
Uta Hick's bearded saki

Bald uakari

The order Primates includes the lemurs, monkeys, and apes, with the latter category including humans. It is divided into four main groupings: strepsirrhines, tarsiers, monkeys of the New World (parvorder Platyrrhini), and monkeys and apes of the Old World. South America's 20 genera of nonhuman primates compares with 6 in Central America, 15 in Madagascar, 23 in Africa and 19 in Asia. All South American monkeys are believed to be descended from ancestors that rafted over from Africa about 25 million years ago in a single dispersal event.

- Suborder: Haplorrhini
  - Infraorder: Simiiformes
    - Parvorder: Platyrrhini (New World monkeys)
      - Family: Aotidae (night monkeys)
        - Genus: Aotus
          - Azara's night monkey, Aotus azarae LC
          - Brumback's night monkey, Aotus brumbacki VU
          - Gray-handed night monkey, Aotus griseimembra VU
          - Hernández-Camacho's night monkey, Aotus jorgehernandezi DD
          - Gray-bellied night monkey, Aotus lemurinus VU
          - Peruvian night monkey, Aotus miconax VU
          - Nancy Ma's night monkey, Aotus nancymaae LC
          - Black-headed night monkey, Aotus nigriceps LC
          - Three-striped night monkey, Aotus trivirgatus LC
          - Spix's night monkey, Aotus vociferans LC
          - Panamanian night monkey, Aotus zonalis DD
      - Family: Callitrichidae
        - Genus: Callibella
          - Roosmalens' dwarf marmoset, Callibella humilis VU
        - Genus: Cebuella
          - Pygmy marmoset, Cebuella pygmaea LC
        - Genus: Callithrix
          - Buffy-tufted marmoset, Callithrix aurita VU
          - Buffy-headed marmoset, Callithrix flaviceps EN
          - White-headed marmoset, Callithrix geoffroyi LC
          - Common marmoset, Callithrix jacchus LC
          - Wied's marmoset, Callithrix kuhlii NT
          - Black-tufted marmoset, Callithrix penicillata LC
        - Genus: Mico
          - Rio Acari marmoset, Mico acariensis DD
          - Silvery marmoset, Mico argentatus LC
          - Gold-and-white marmoset, Mico chrysoleucus DD
          - Emilia's marmoset, Mico emiliae DD
          - Santarem marmoset, Mico humeralifer DD
          - Hershkovitz's marmoset, Mico intermedius LC
          - White marmoset, Mico leucippe VU
          - Manicore marmoset, Mico manicorensis LC
          - Marca's marmoset, Mico marcai DD
          - Maués marmoset, Mico mauesi LC
          - Black-tailed marmoset, Mico melanurus LC
          - Black-headed marmoset, Mico nigriceps DD
          - Rondon's marmoset, Mico rondoni VU
          - Satéré marmoset, Mico saterei LC
        - Genus: Callimico
          - Goeldi's marmoset, Callimico goeldii VU
        - Genus: Leontopithecus
          - Superagui lion tamarin, Leontopithecus caissara CR
          - Golden-headed lion tamarin, Leontopithecus chrysomelas EN
          - Black lion tamarin, Leontopithecus chrysopygus EN
          - Golden lion tamarin, Leontopithecus rosalia EN
        - Genus: Saguinus
          - Pied tamarin, Saguinus bicolor EN
          - Brown-mantled tamarin, Saguinus fuscicollis LC
          - Geoffroy's tamarin, Saguinus geoffroyi LC
          - Graells's tamarin, Saguinus graellsi NT
          - Emperor tamarin, Saguinus imperator LC
          - Mottle-faced tamarin, Saguinus inustus LC
          - White-lipped tamarin, Saguinus labiatus LC
          - White-footed tamarin, Saguinus leucopus EN
          - Martins's tamarin, Saguinus martinsi LC
          - White-mantled tamarin, Saguinus melanoleucus LC
          - Red-handed tamarin, Saguinus midas LC
          - Moustached tamarin, Saguinus mystax LC
          - Black tamarin, Saguinus niger VU
          - Black-mantled tamarin, Saguinus nigricollis LC
          - Cottontop tamarin, Saguinus oedipus CR
          - Red-capped tamarin, Saguinus pileatus LC
          - Golden-mantled tamarin, Saguinus tripartitus NT
      - Family: Cebidae
        - Subfamily: Cebinae
          - Genus: Cebus
            - Ecuadorian capuchin, Cebus aequatorialis CR
            - White-fronted capuchin, Cebus albifrons LC
            - Brown weeper capuchin, Cebus brunneus LC
            - Colombian white-headed capuchin, Cebus capucinus LC
            - Río Cesar white-fronted capuchin, Cebus cesarae DD
            - Shock-headed capuchin, Cebus cuscinus NT
            - Kaapori capuchin, Cebus kaapori CR
            - Sierra de Perijá white-fronted capuchin, Cebus leucocephalus NE
            - Santa Marta white-fronted capuchin, Cebus malitiosus EN
            - Wedge-capped capuchin, Cebus olivaceus LC
            - Spix's white-fronted capuchin, Cebus unicolor NE
            - Varied white-fronted capuchin, Cebus versicolor EN
            - Marañón white-fronted capuchin, Cebus yuracus NE
          - Genus: Sapajus
            - Tufted capuchin, Sapajus apella LC
            - Azaras's capuchin, Sapajus cay LC
            - Blond capuchin, Sapajus flavius CR
            - Black-striped capuchin, Sapajus libidinosus LC
            - Large-headed capuchin, Sapajus macrocephalus LC
            - Black capuchin, Sapajus nigritus NT
            - Crested capuchin, Sapajus robustus EN
            - Golden-bellied capuchin, Sapajus xanthosternos CR
        - Subfamily: Saimiriinae
          - Genus: Saimiri
            - Black-capped squirrel monkey, Saimiri boliviensis LC
            - Humboldt's squirrel monkey, Saimiri cassiquiarensis
            - Collins' squirrel monkey, Saimiri collinsii
            - Guianan squirrel monkey, Saimiri sciureus LC
            - Bare-eared squirrel monkey, Saimiri ustus NT
            - Black squirrel monkey, Saimiri vanzolinii VU
      - Family: Atelidae
        - Subfamily: Alouattinae
          - Genus: Alouatta
            - Ursine howler, Alouatta arctoidea LC
            - Red-handed howler, Alouatta belzebul VU
            - Black howler, Alouatta caraya LC
            - Spix's red-handed howler, Alouatta discolor VU
            - Brown howler, Alouatta guariba LC
            - Juruá red howler, Alouatta juara LC
            - Guyanan red howler, Alouatta macconnelli LC
            - Amazon black howler, Alouatta nigerrima LC
            - Mantled howler, Alouatta palliata LC
            - Purus red howler, Alouatta puruensis LC
            - Bolivian red howler, Alouatta sara LC
            - Venezuelan red howler, Alouatta seniculus LC
            - Maranhão red-handed howler, Alouatta ululata EN
        - Subfamily: Atelinae
          - Genus: Ateles
            - White-fronted spider monkey, Ateles belzebuth EN
            - Peruvian spider monkey, Ateles chamek EN
            - Black-headed spider monkey, Ateles fusciceps CR
            - Geoffroy's spider monkey, Ateles geoffroyi EN
            - Brown spider monkey, Ateles hybridus CR
            - White-cheeked spider monkey, Ateles marginatus EN
            - Red-faced spider monkey, Ateles paniscus VU
          - Genus: Brachyteles
            - Southern muriqui, Brachyteles arachnoides EN
            - Northern muriqui, Brachyteles hypoxanthus CR
          - Genus: Lagothrix
            - Gray woolly monkey, Lagothrix cana EN
            - Brown woolly monkey, Lagothrix lagothricha VU
            - Colombian woolly monkey, Lagothrix lugens CR
            - Silvery woolly monkey, Lagothrix poeppigii VU
          - Genus: Oreonax
            - Yellow-tailed woolly monkey, Oreonax flavicauda CR
      - Family: Pitheciidae
        - Subfamily: Callicebinae
          - Genus: Cheracebus
            - Lucifer titi, Cheracebus lucifer LC
            - Black titi, Cheracebus lugens LC
            - Colombian black-handed titi, Cheracebus medemi VU
            - Rio Purus titi, Cheracebus purinus LC
            - Red-headed titi, Cheracebus regulus LC
            - Collared titi, Cheracebus torquatus LC
          - Genus: Callicebus
            - Barbara Brown's titi, Plecturocebus barbarabrownae CR
            - Coimbra Filho's titi, Callicebus coimbrai EN
            - Coastal black-handed titi, Callicebus melanochir VU
            - Black-fronted titi, Callicebus nigrifrons NT
            - Atlantic titi, Callicebus personatus VU
          - Genus: Plecturocebus
            - Madidi titi, Plecturocebus aureipalatii LC
            - Baptista Lake titi, Plecturocebus baptista LC
            - Prince Bernhard's titi, Plecturocebus bernhardi LC
            - Brown titi, Plecturocebus brunneus LC
            - Chestnut-bellied titi, Plecturocebus caligatus LC
            - Caquetá titi, Plecturocebus caquetensis CR
            - Ashy black titi, Plecturocebus cinerascens LC
            - Coppery titi, Plecturocebus cupreus LC
            - White-tailed titi, Plecturocebus discolor LC
            - White-eared titi, Plecturocebus donacophilus LC
            - Hershkovitz's titi, Plecturocebus dubius LC
            - Alta Floresta titi, Plecturocebus groves
            - Hoffmanns's titi, Plecturocebus hoffmannsi LC
            - Milton's titi, Plecturocebus miltoni NE
            - Rio Beni titi, Plecturocebus modestus EN
            - Red-bellied titi, Plecturocebus moloch LC
            - Rio Mayo titi, Plecturocebus oenanthe EN
            - Ollala brothers' titi, Plecturocebus olallae EN
            - Ornate titi, Plecturocebus ornatus VU
            - White-coated titi, Plecturocebus pallescens LC
            - Stephen Nash's titi, Plecturocebus stephennashi DD
            - Urubamba brown titi, Plecturocebus urubambensis NE
            - Vieira's titi, Plecturocebus vieirai NE
        - Subfamily: Pitheciinae
          - Genus: Pithecia
            - Equatorial saki, Pithecia aequatorialis LC
            - White-footed saki, Pithecia albicans VU
            - Cazuza's saki, Pithecia cazuzai NE
            - Golden-faced saki, Pithecia chrysocephala LC
            - Hairy saki, Pithecia hirsuta NE
            - Burnished saki, Pithecia inusta NE
            - Rio Tapajós saki, Pithecia irrorata NE
            - Isabel's saki, Pithecia isabela NE
            - Monk saki, Pithecia monachus NE
            - Miller's saki, Pithecia milleri DD
            - Mittermeier's Tapajós saki, Pithecia mittermeieri NE
            - Napo saki, Pithecia napensis DD
            - White-faced saki, Pithecia pithecia LC
            - Pissinatti's bald-faced saki, Pithecia pissinattii NE
            - Rylands' bald-faced saki, Pithecia rylandsi NE
            - Vanzolini's bald-faced saki, Pithecia vanzolinii DD
          - Genus: Chiropotes
            - White-nosed saki, Chiropotes albinasus EN
            - Red-backed bearded saki, Chiropotes chiropotes LC
            - Brown-backed bearded saki, Chiropotes israelita
            - Black bearded saki, Chiropotes satanas CR
            - Uta Hick's bearded saki, Chiropotes utahicki EN
          - Genus: Cacajao
            - Aracá uakari, Cacajao ayresii VU
            - Bald uakari, Cacajao calvus VU
            - Neblina uakari, Cacajao hosomi VU
            - Golden-backed uakari, Cacajao melanocephalus LC

===== Order: Rodentia (rodents) =====
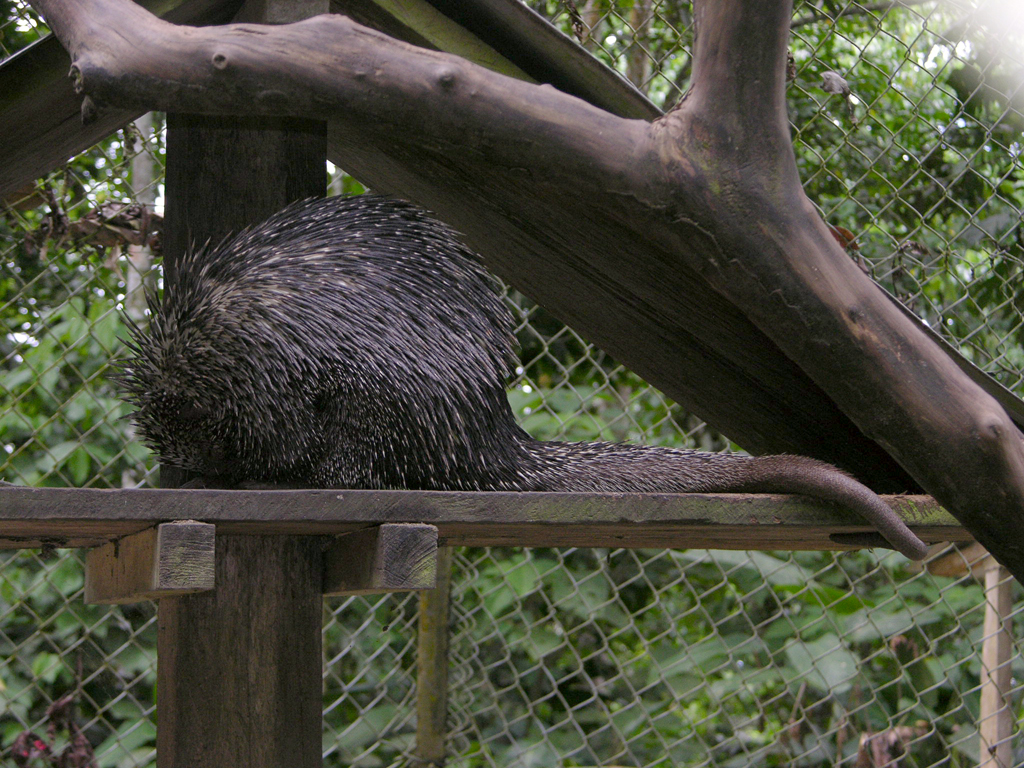
Bicolored-spined porcupine

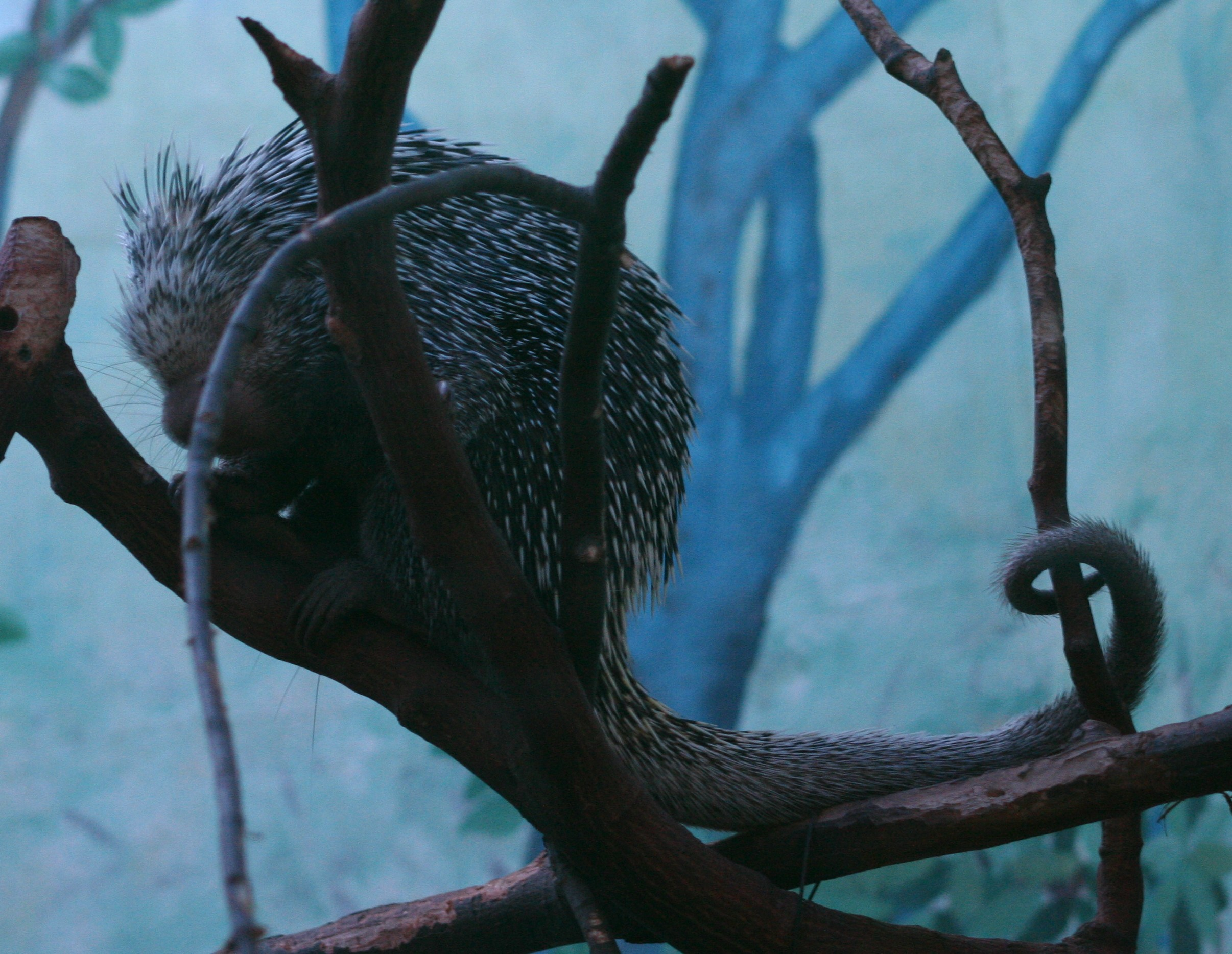
Brazilian porcupine

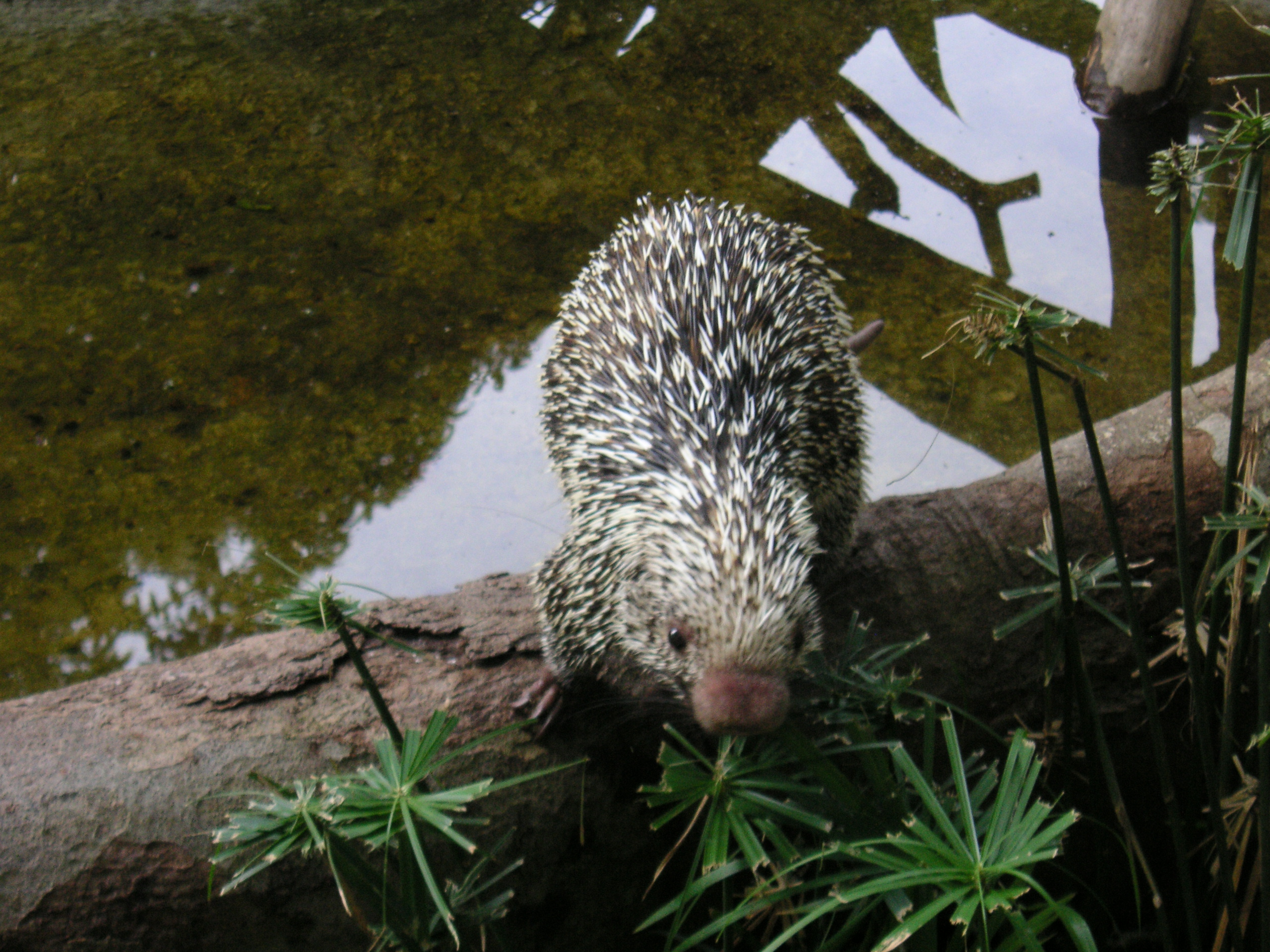
Rothschild's porcupine

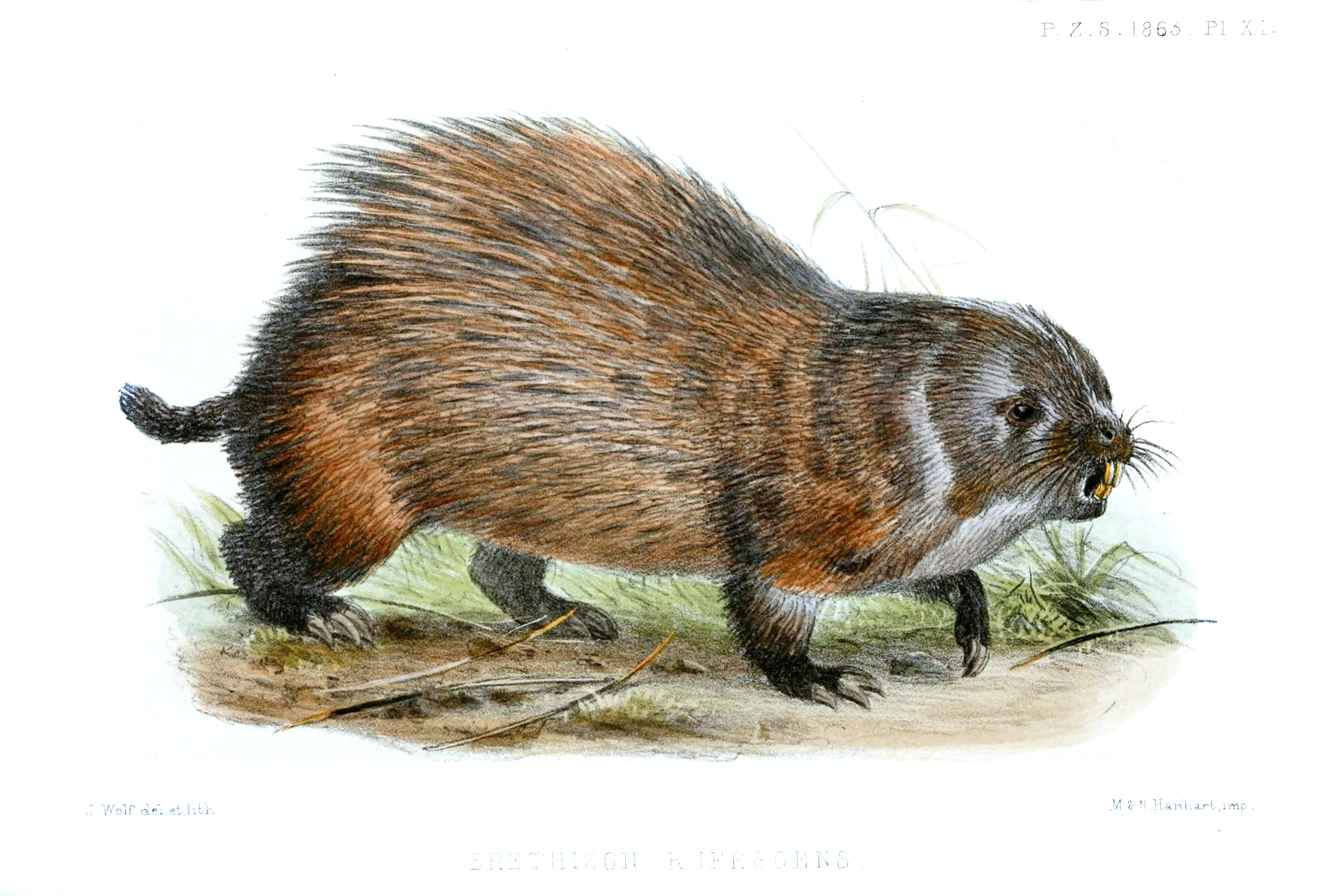
Stump-tailed porcupine

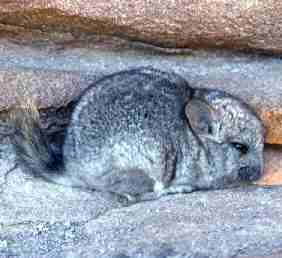
Short-tailed chinchilla

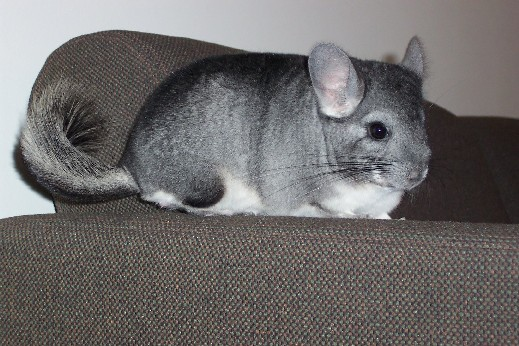
Long-tailed chinchilla

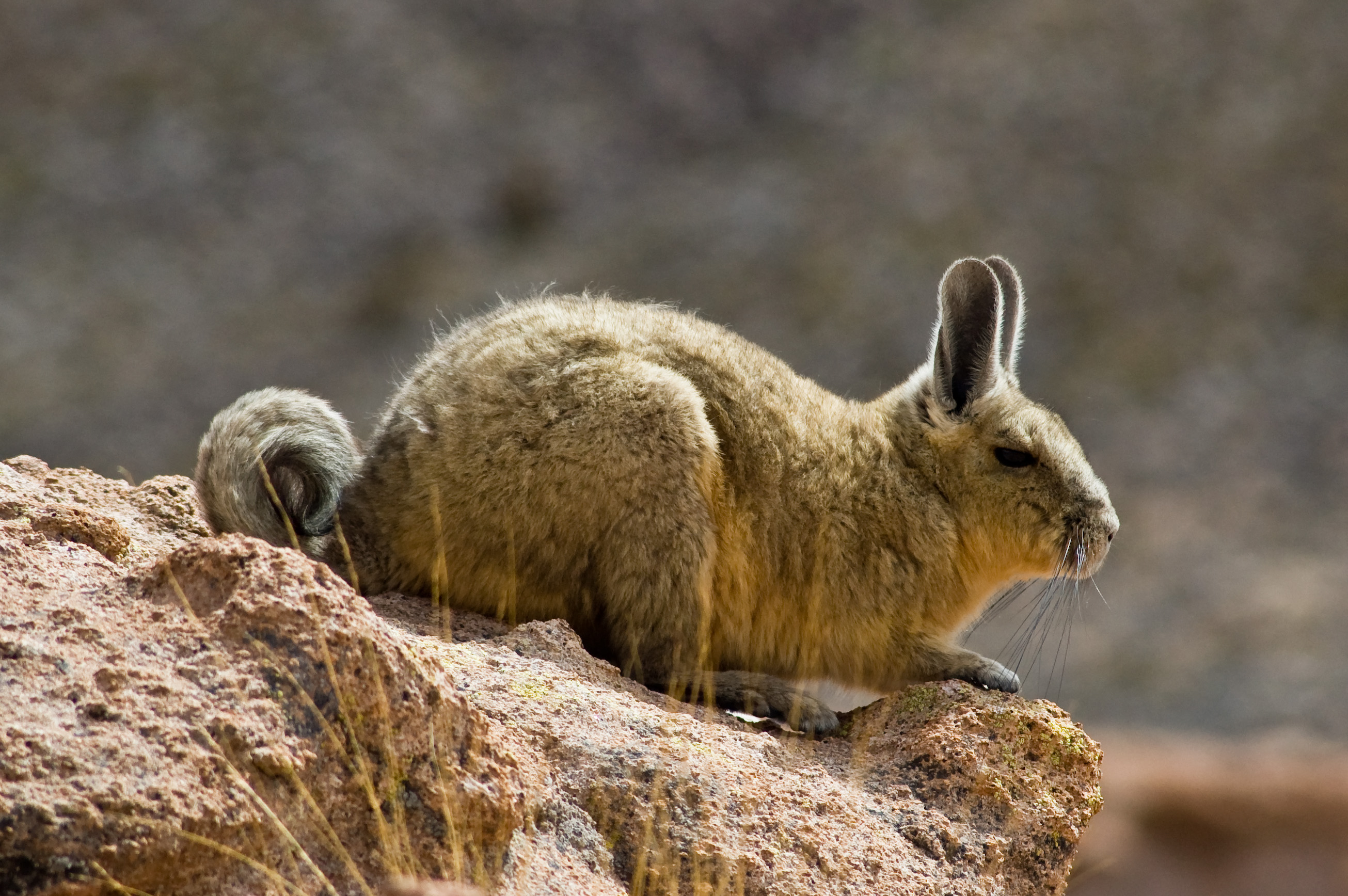
Southern viscacha

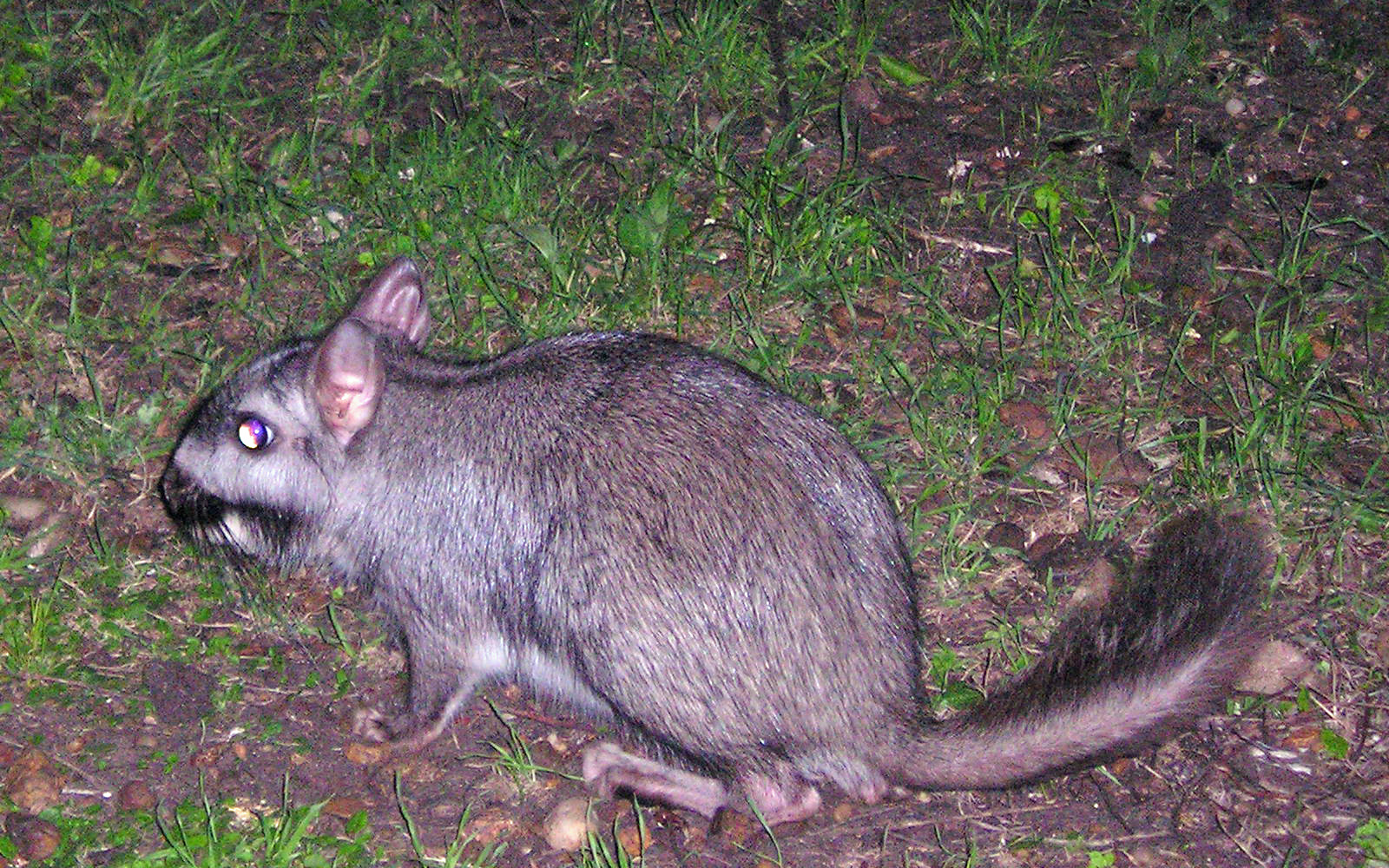
Plains viscacha

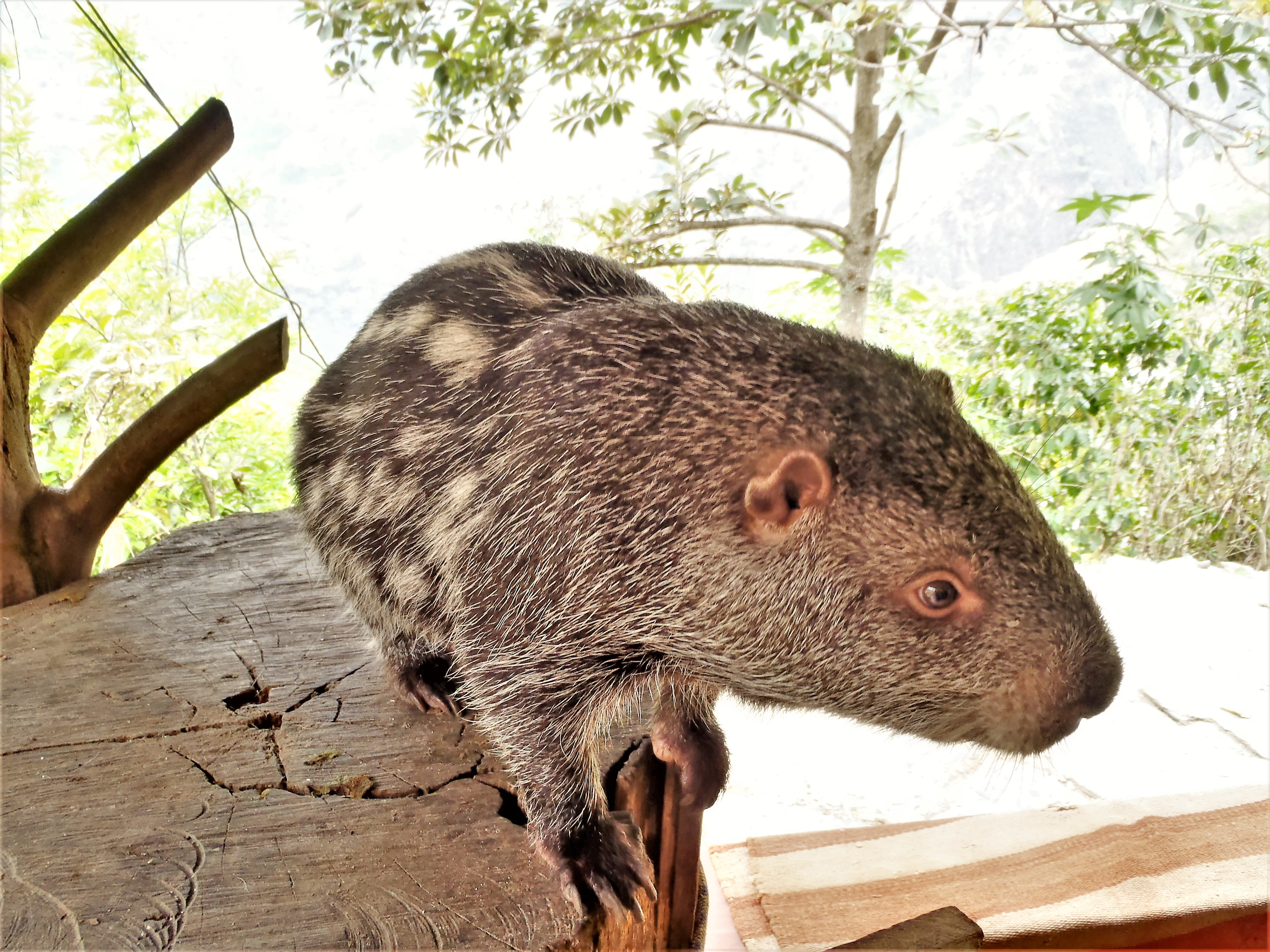
Pacarana

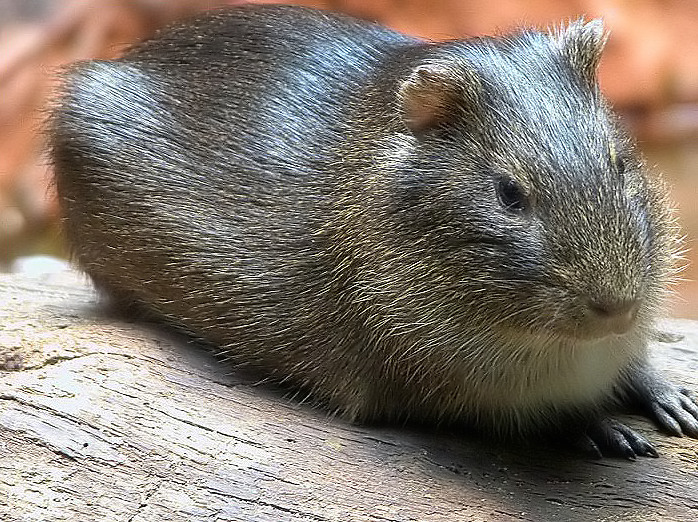
Brazilian guinea pig

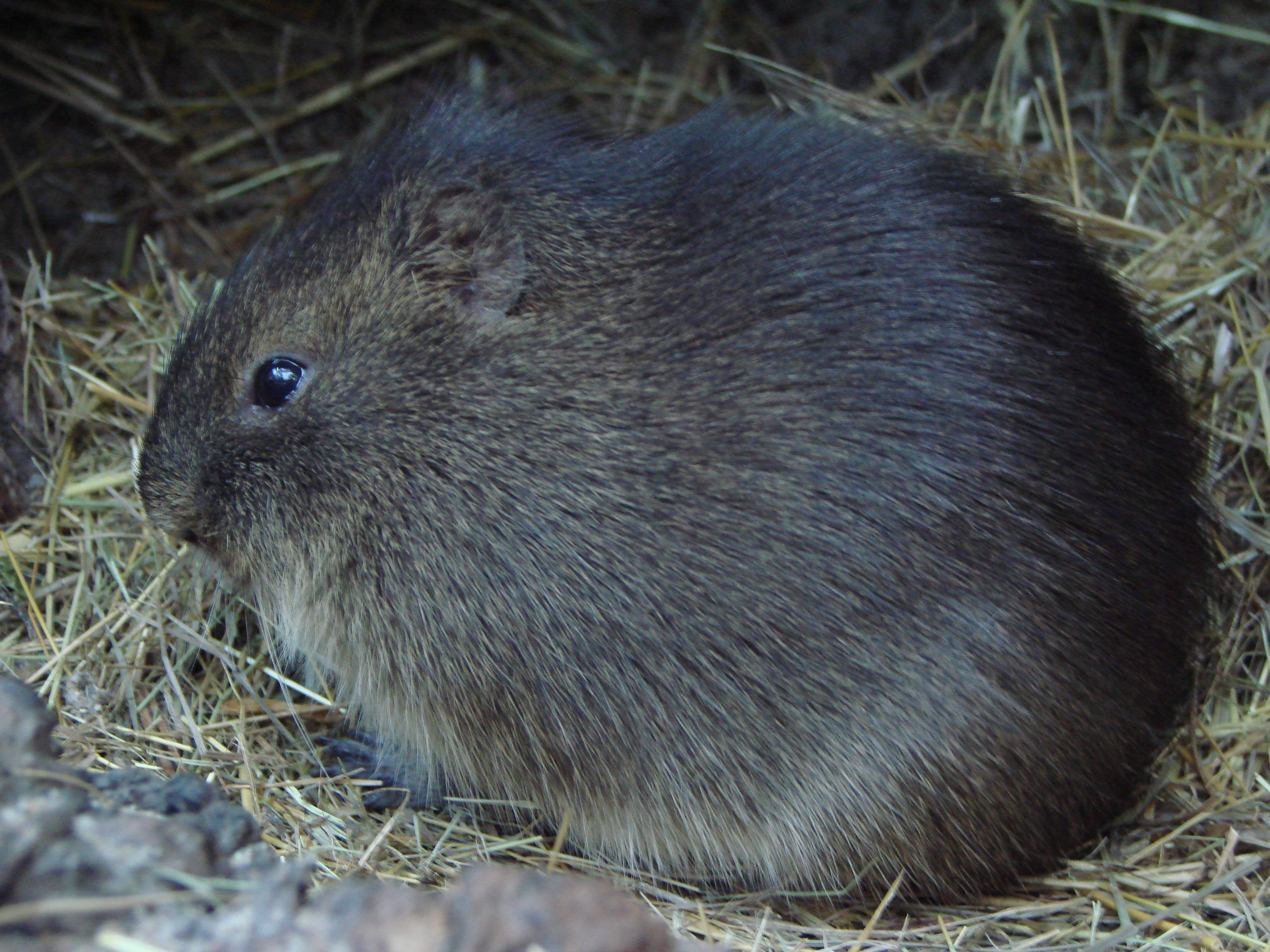
Greater guinea pig

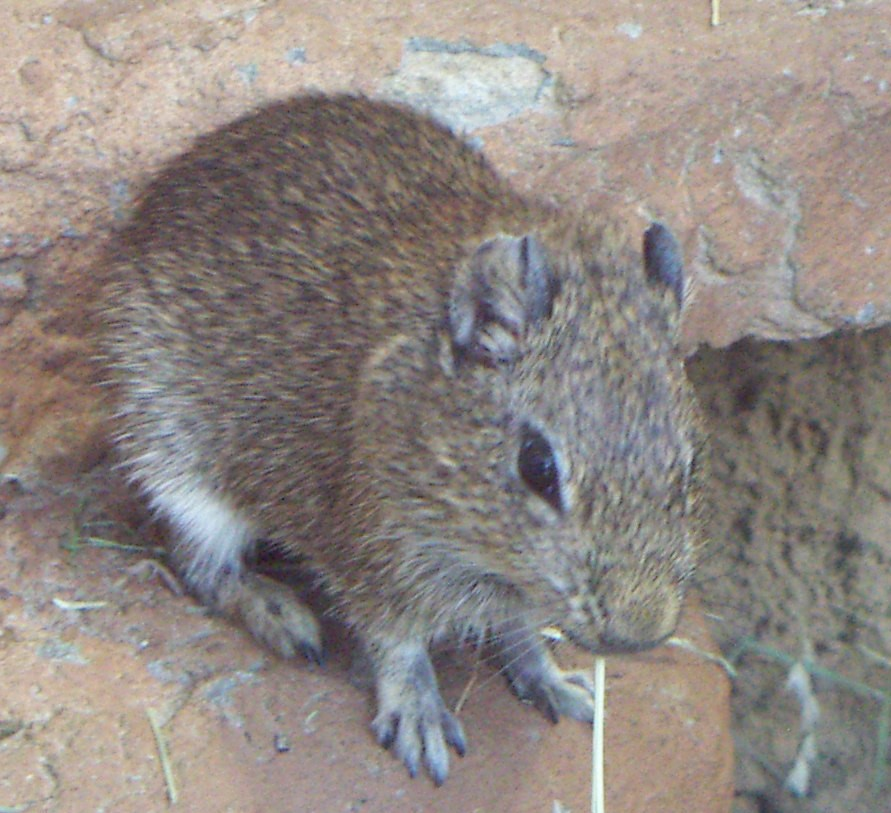
Muenster yellow-toothed cavy

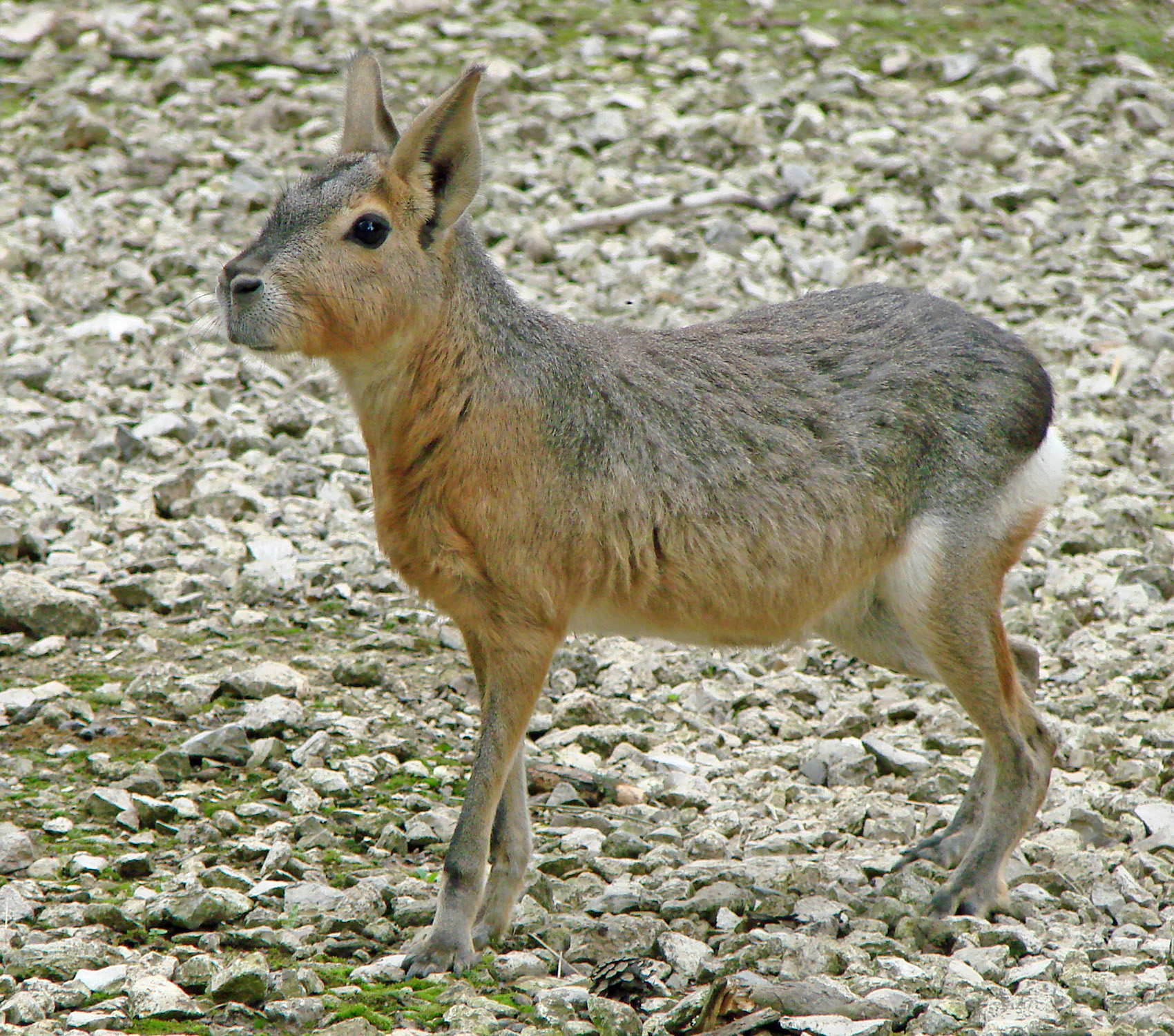
Patagonian mara

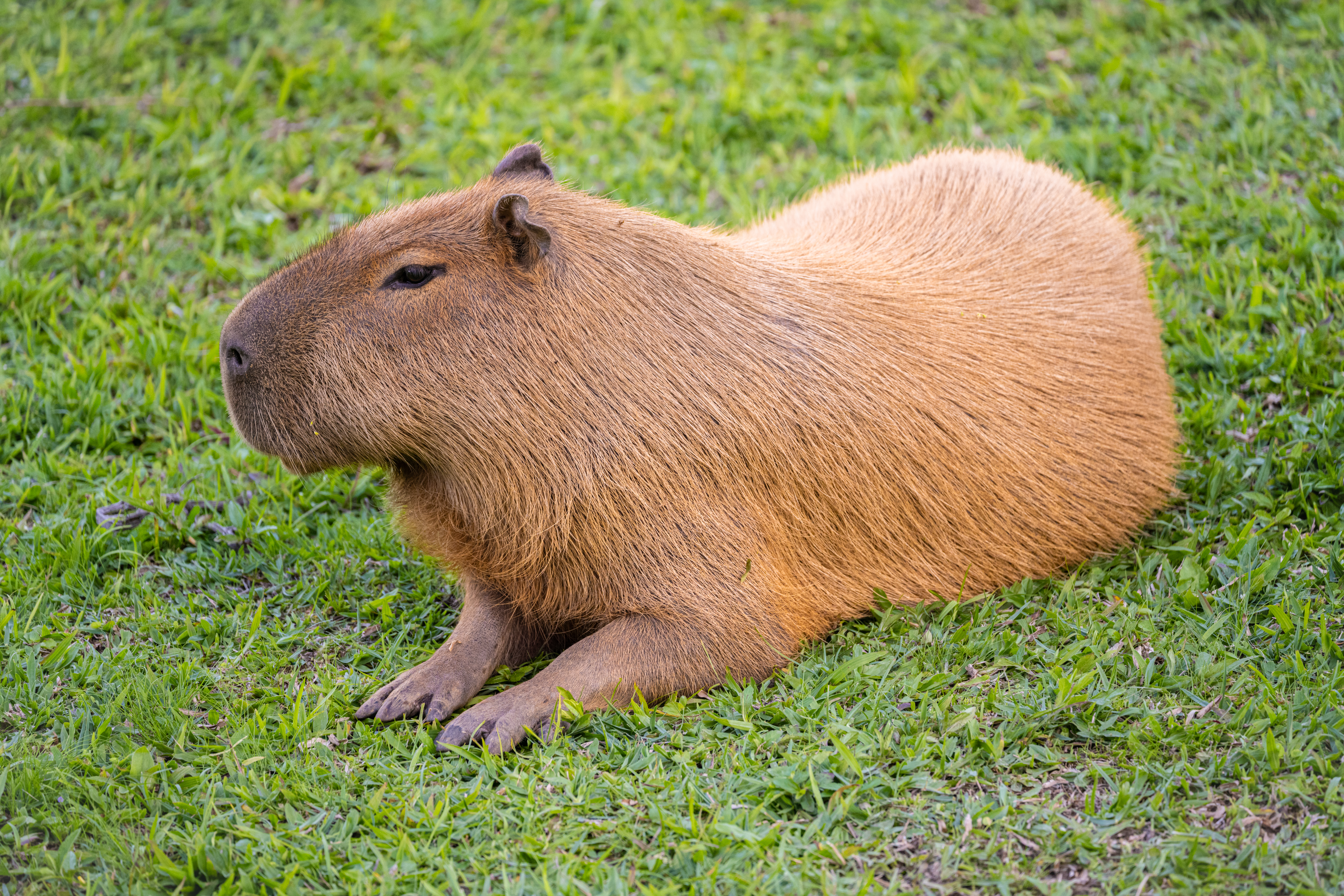
Capybara

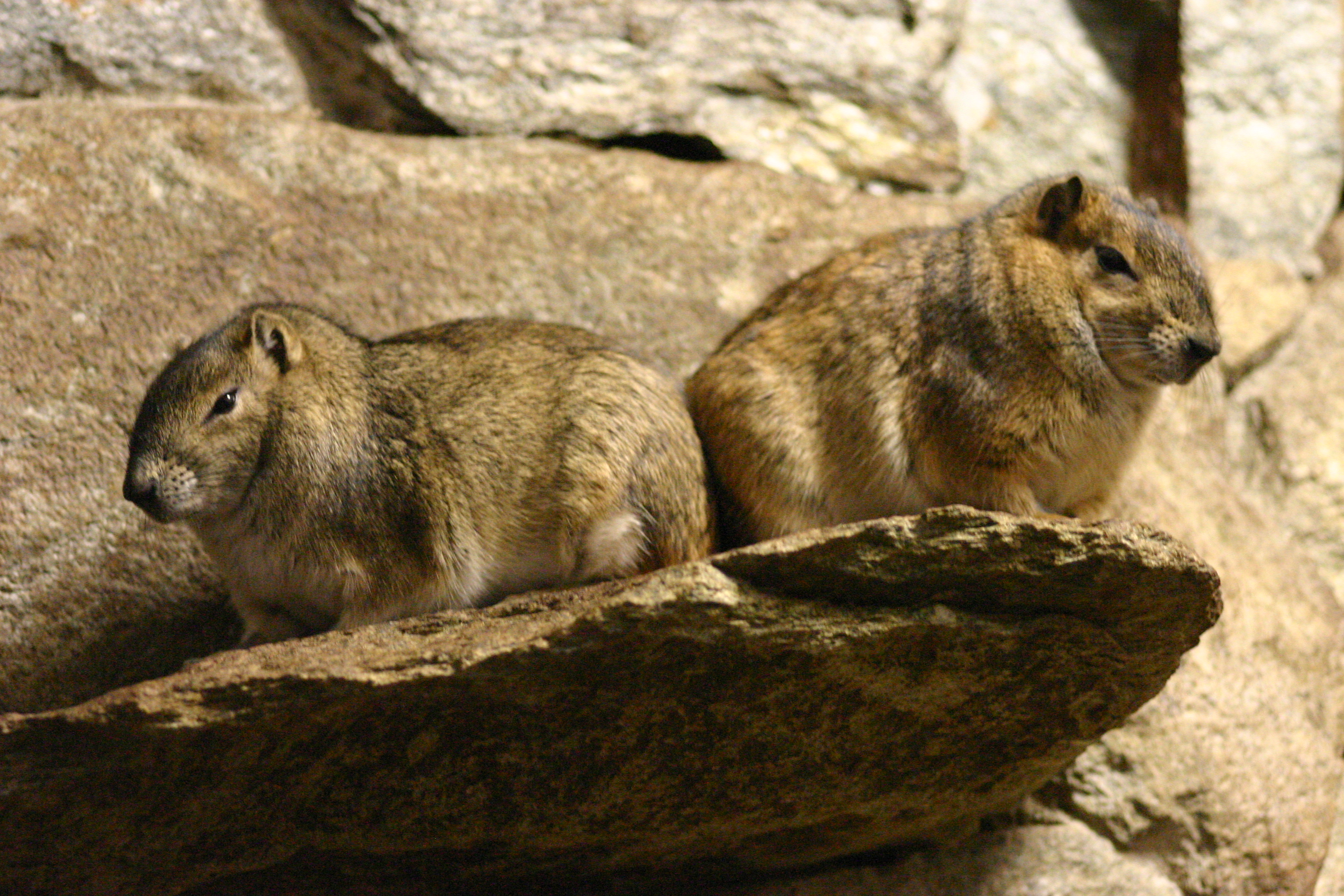
Rock cavies

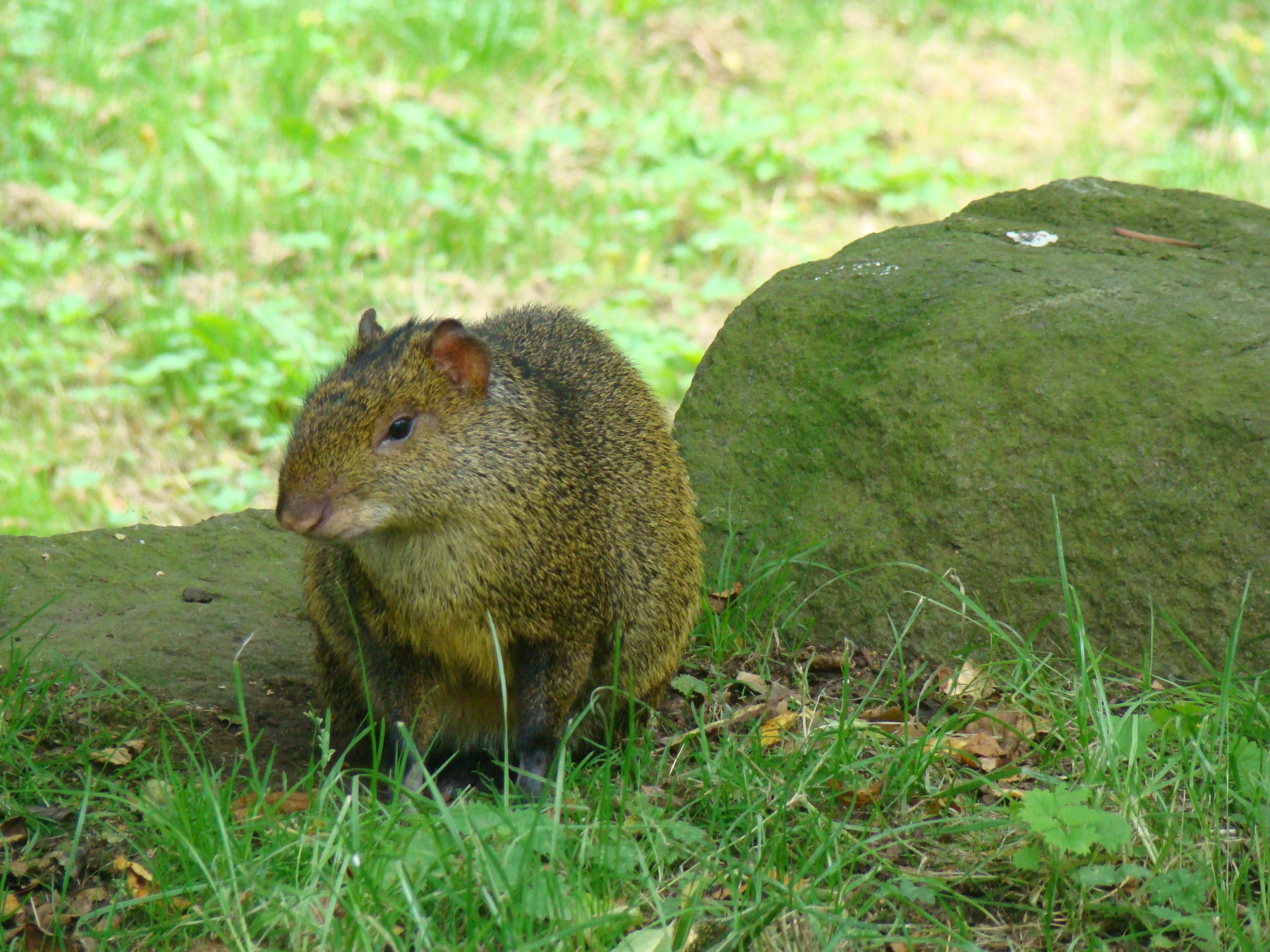
Azara's agouti

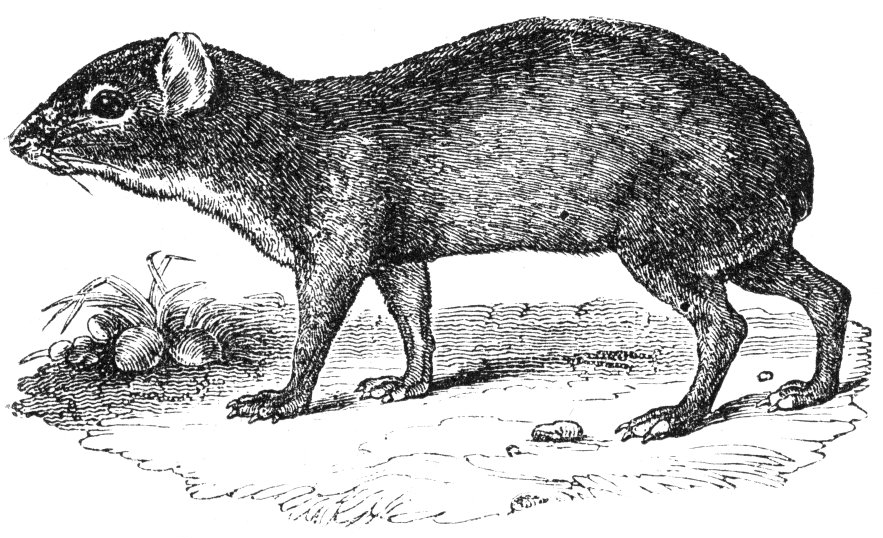
Black agouti

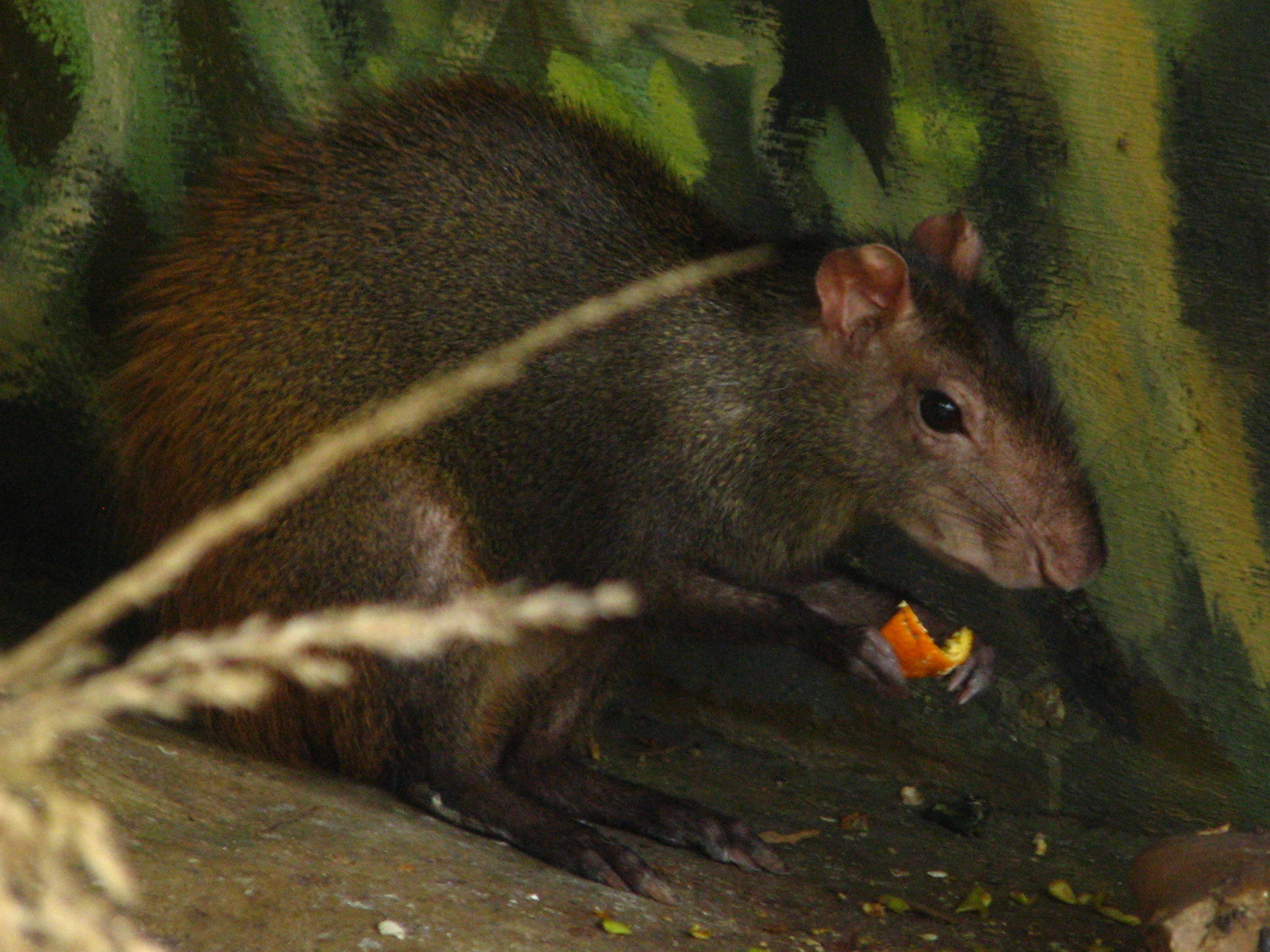
Red-rumped agouti

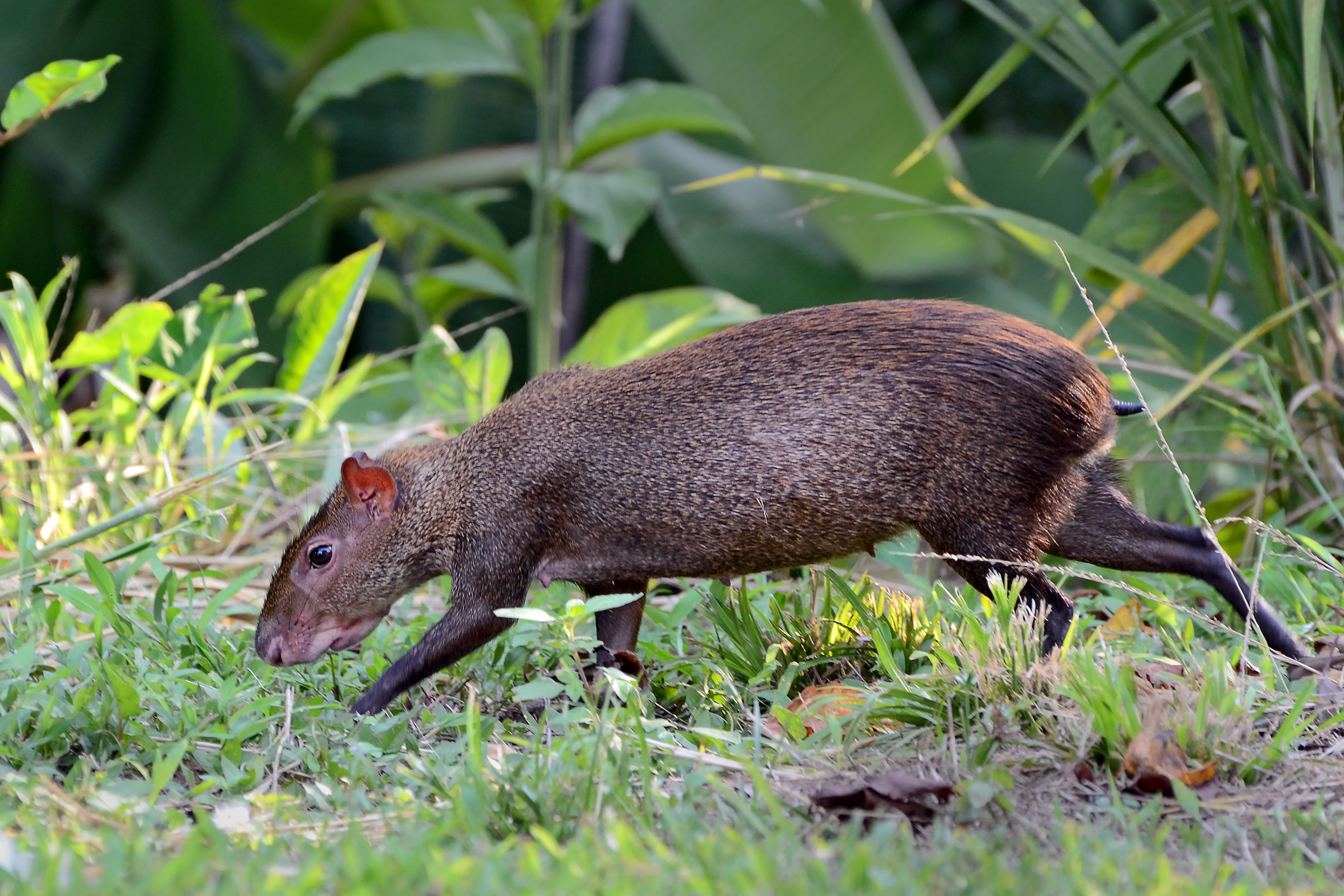
Central American agouti

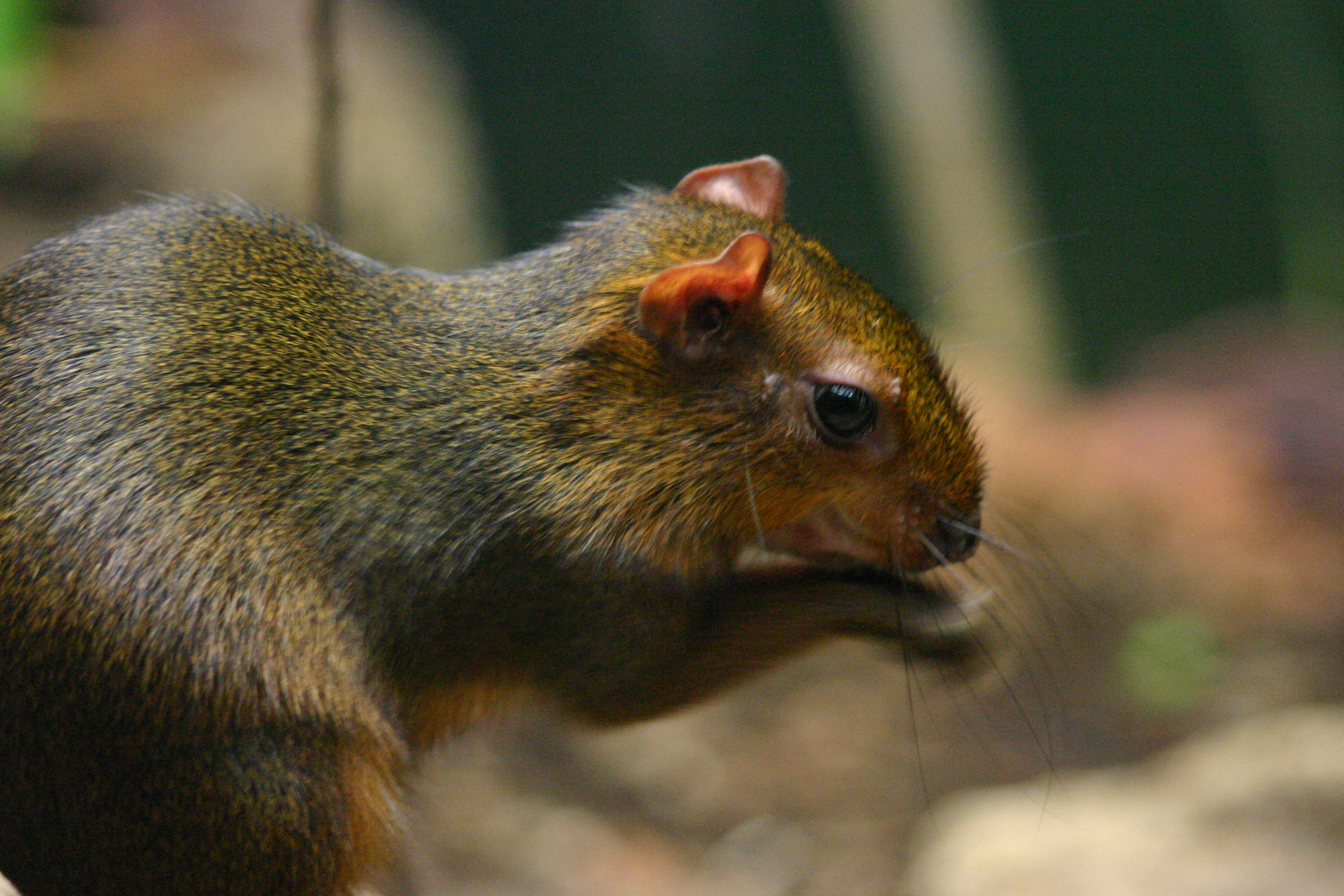
Green acouchi

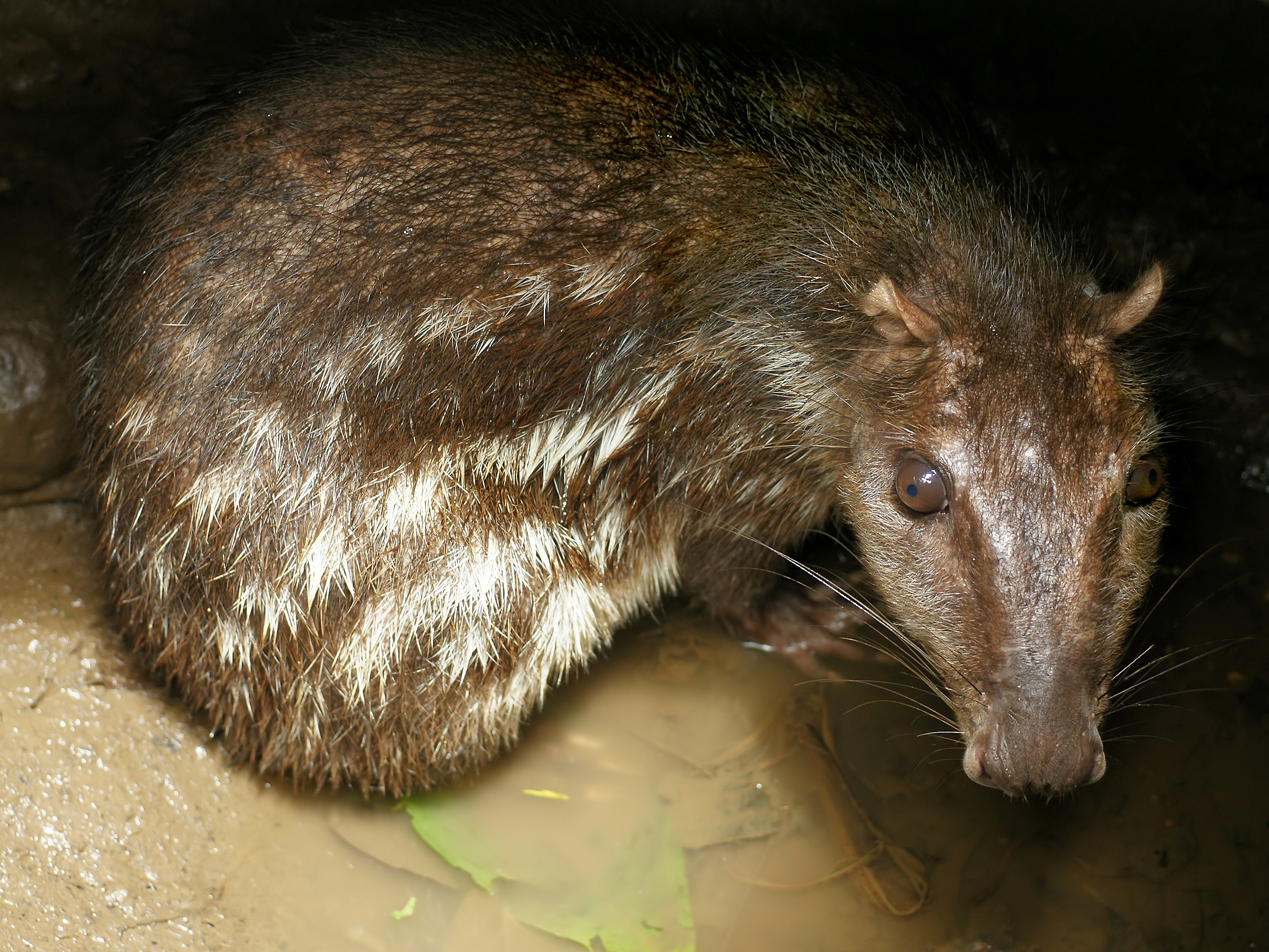
Lowland paca

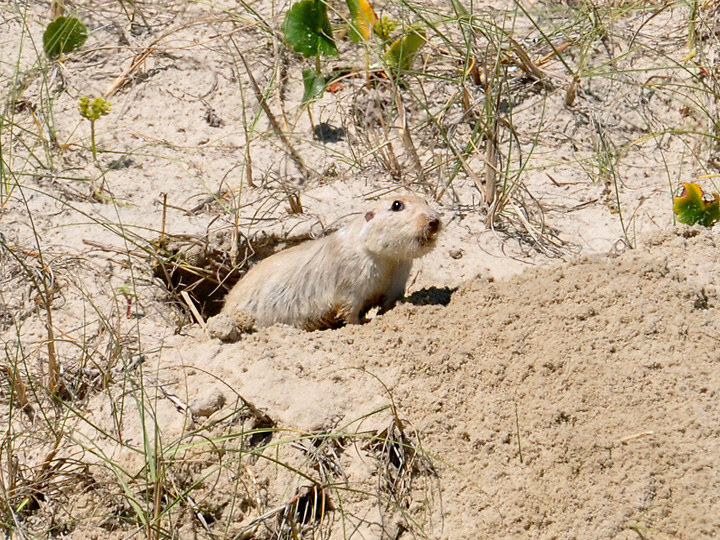
Flamarion's tuco-tuco

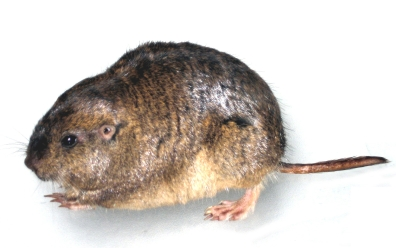
Haig's tuco-tuco

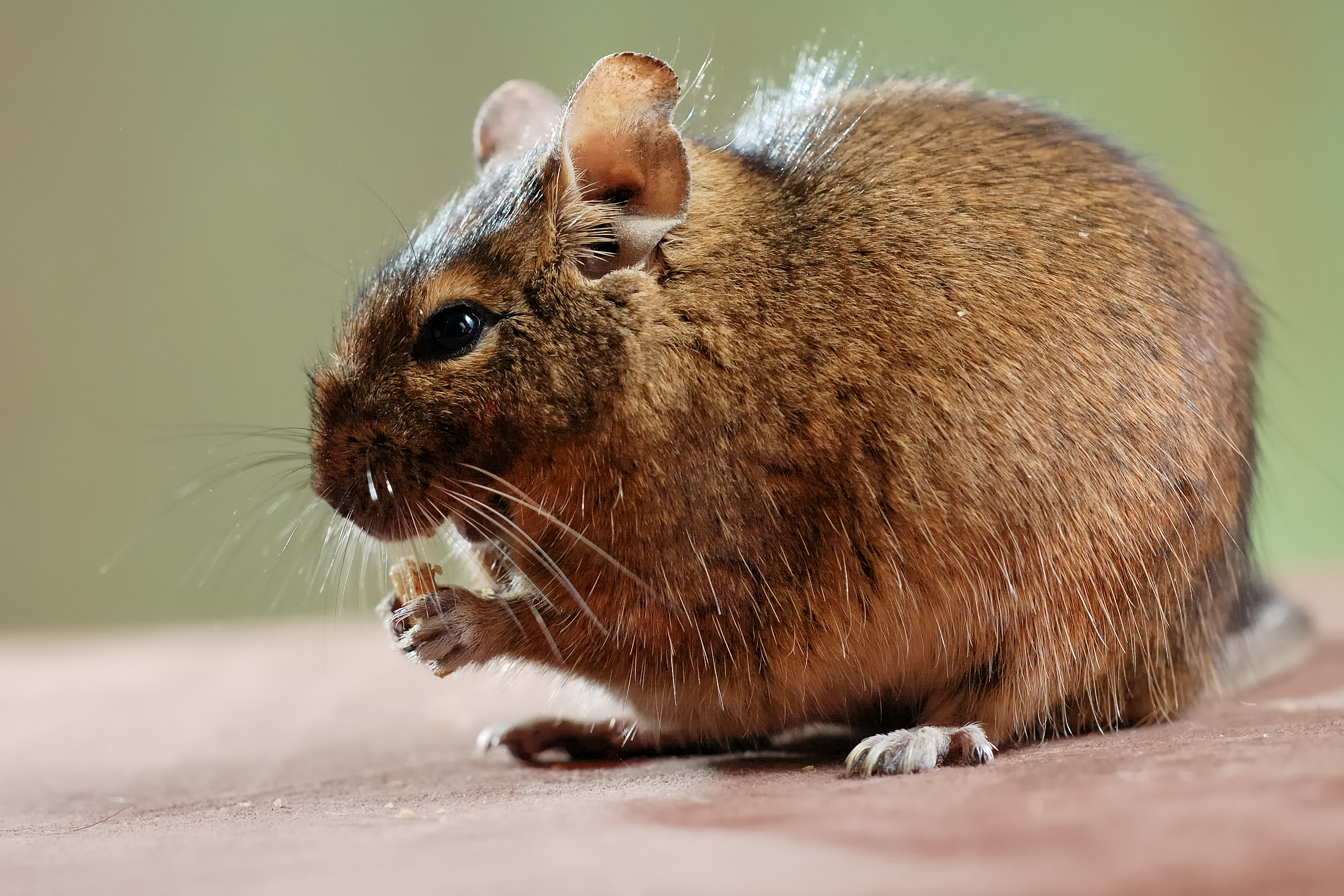
Common degu

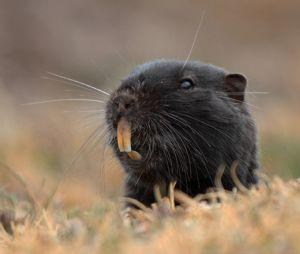
Coruro

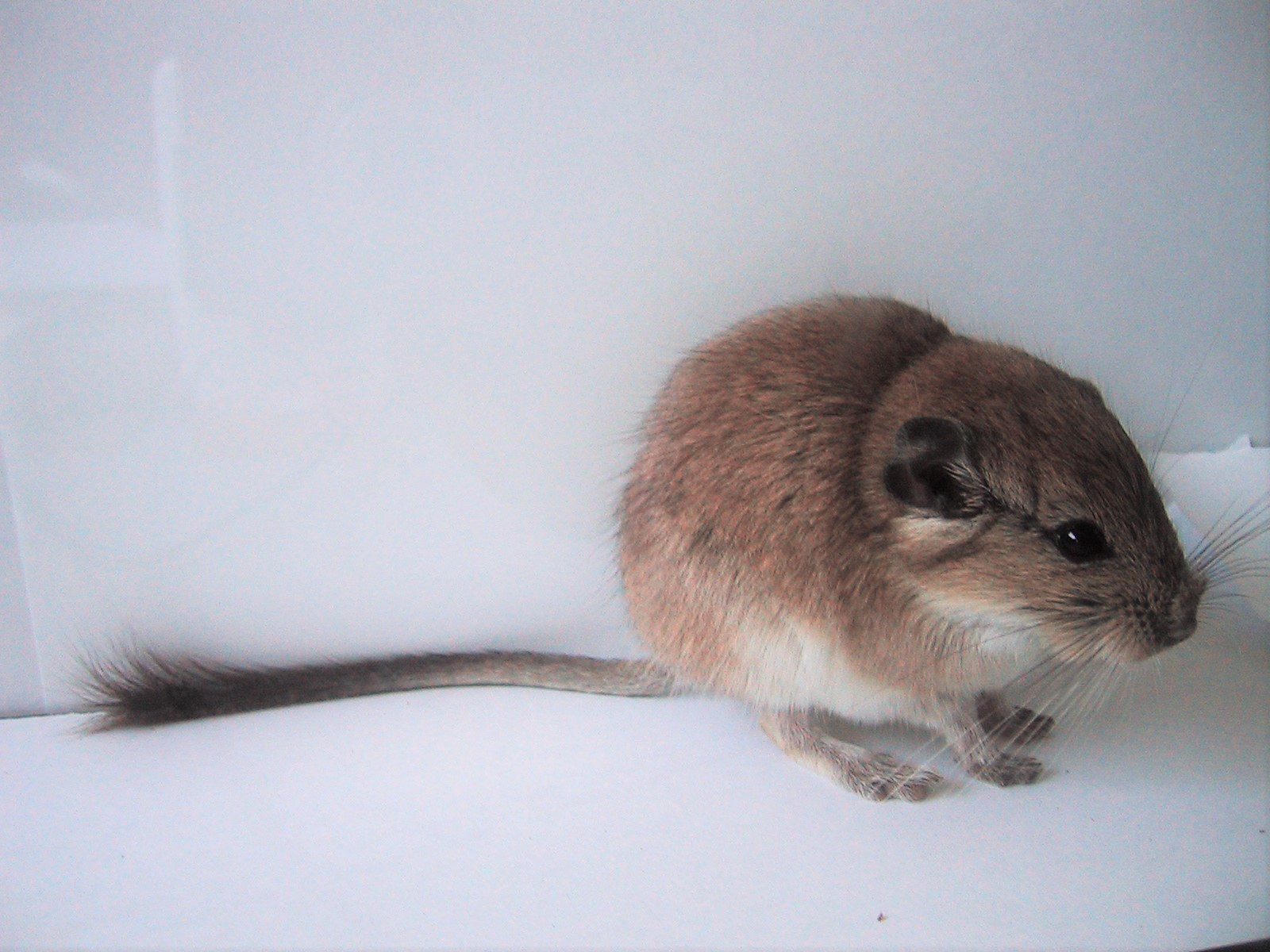
Plains viscacha rat

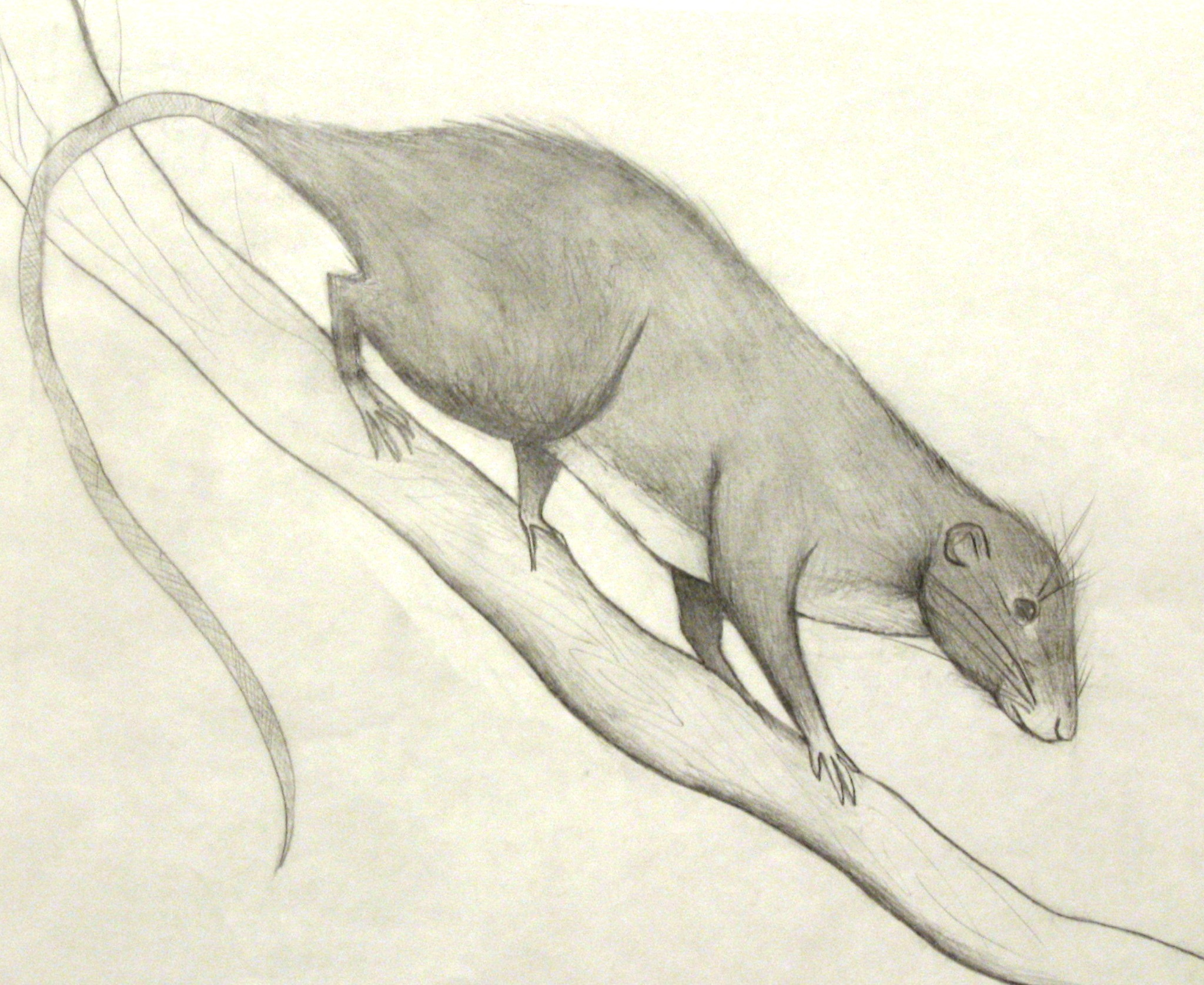
Amazon bamboo rat

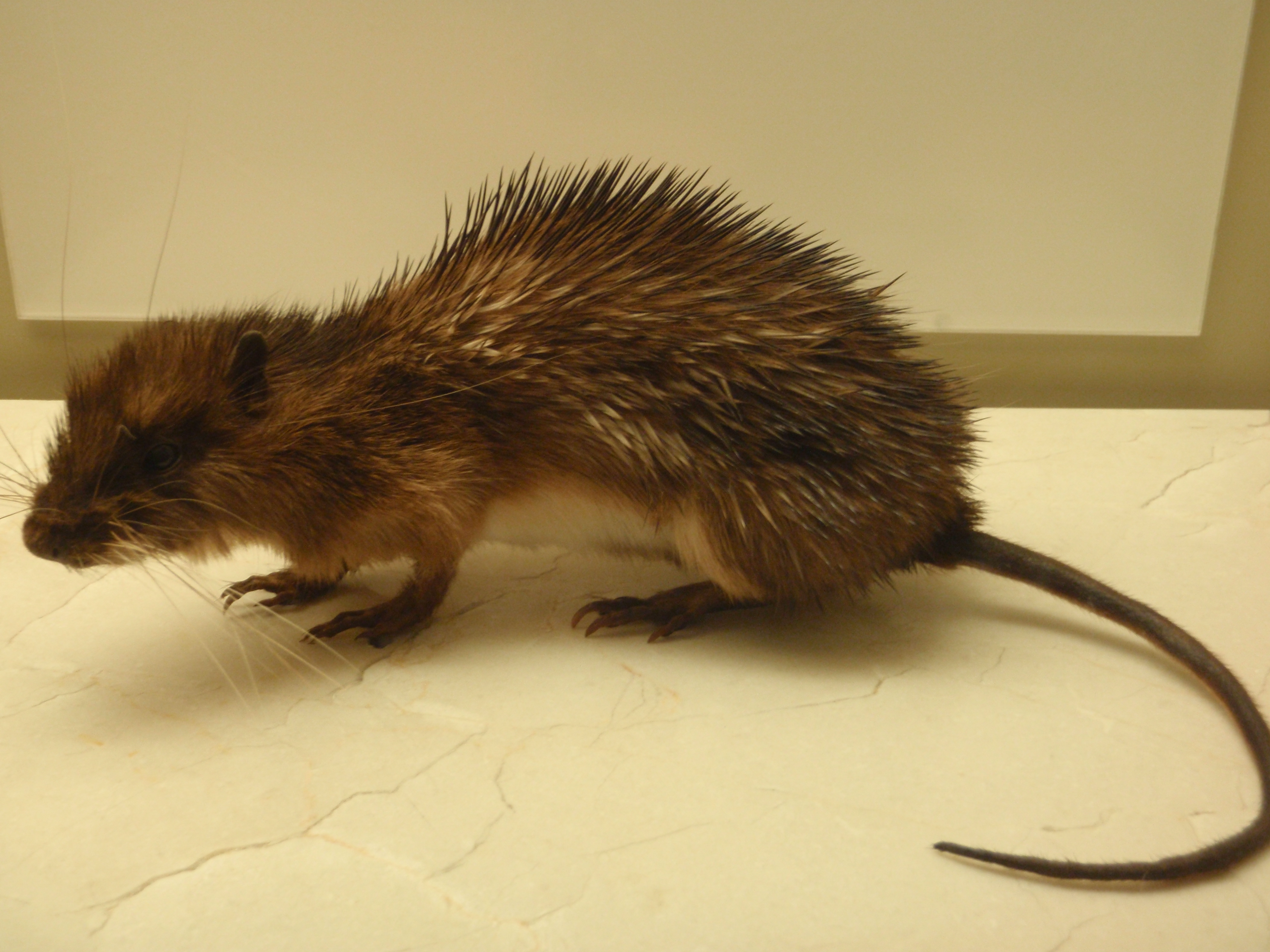
Armored rat

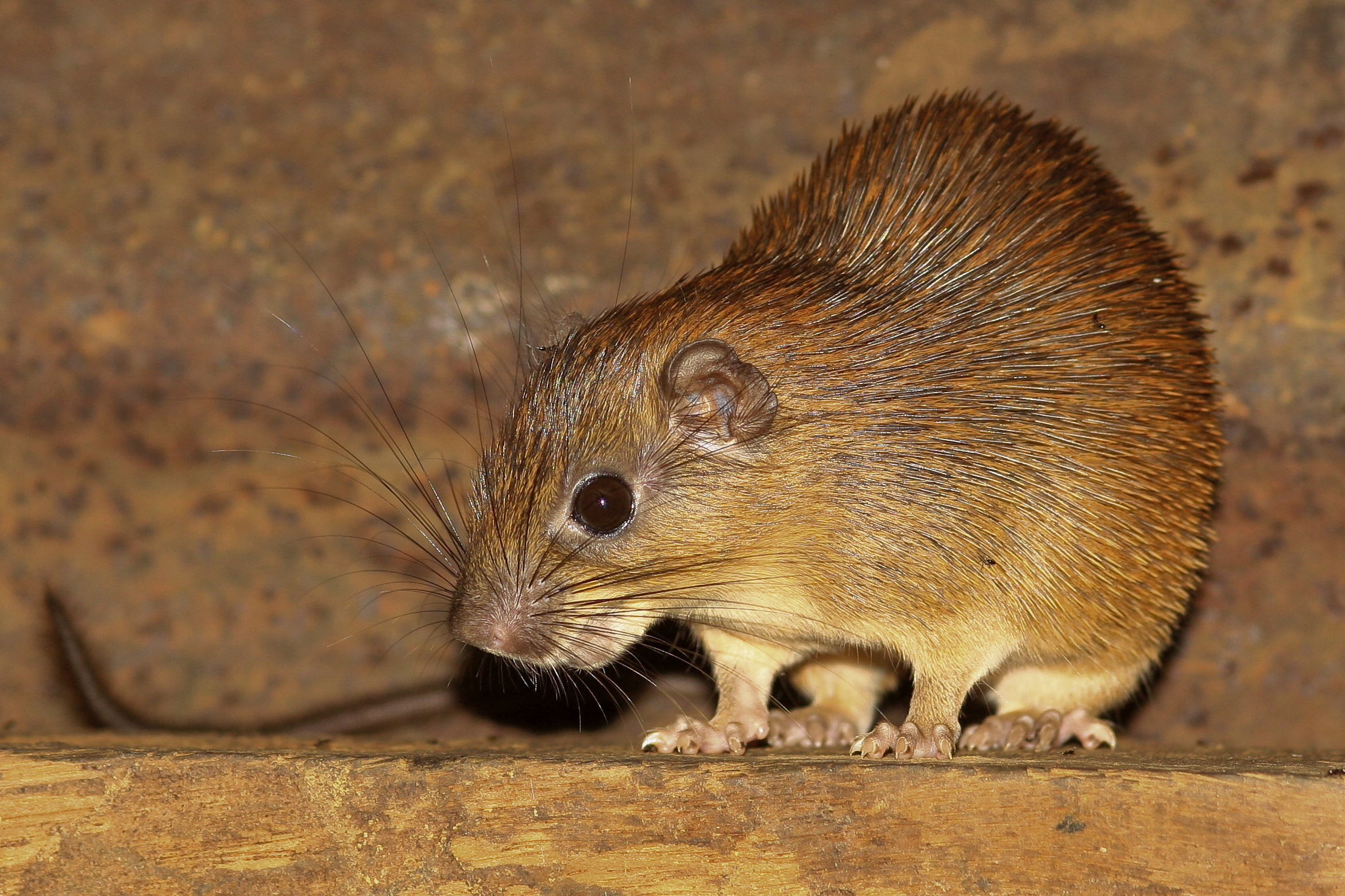
Ferreira's spiny tree-rat

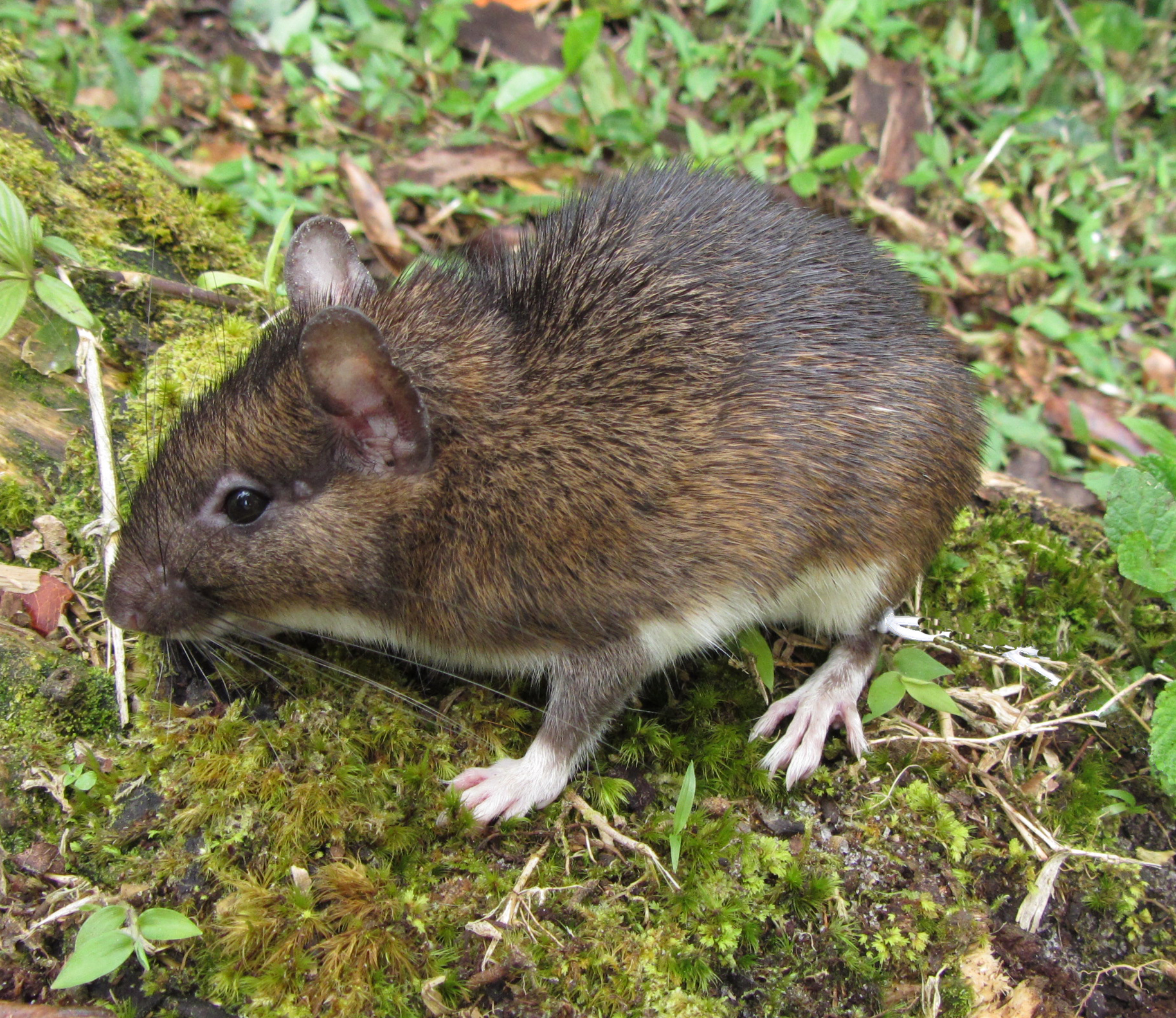
Atlantic spiny rat

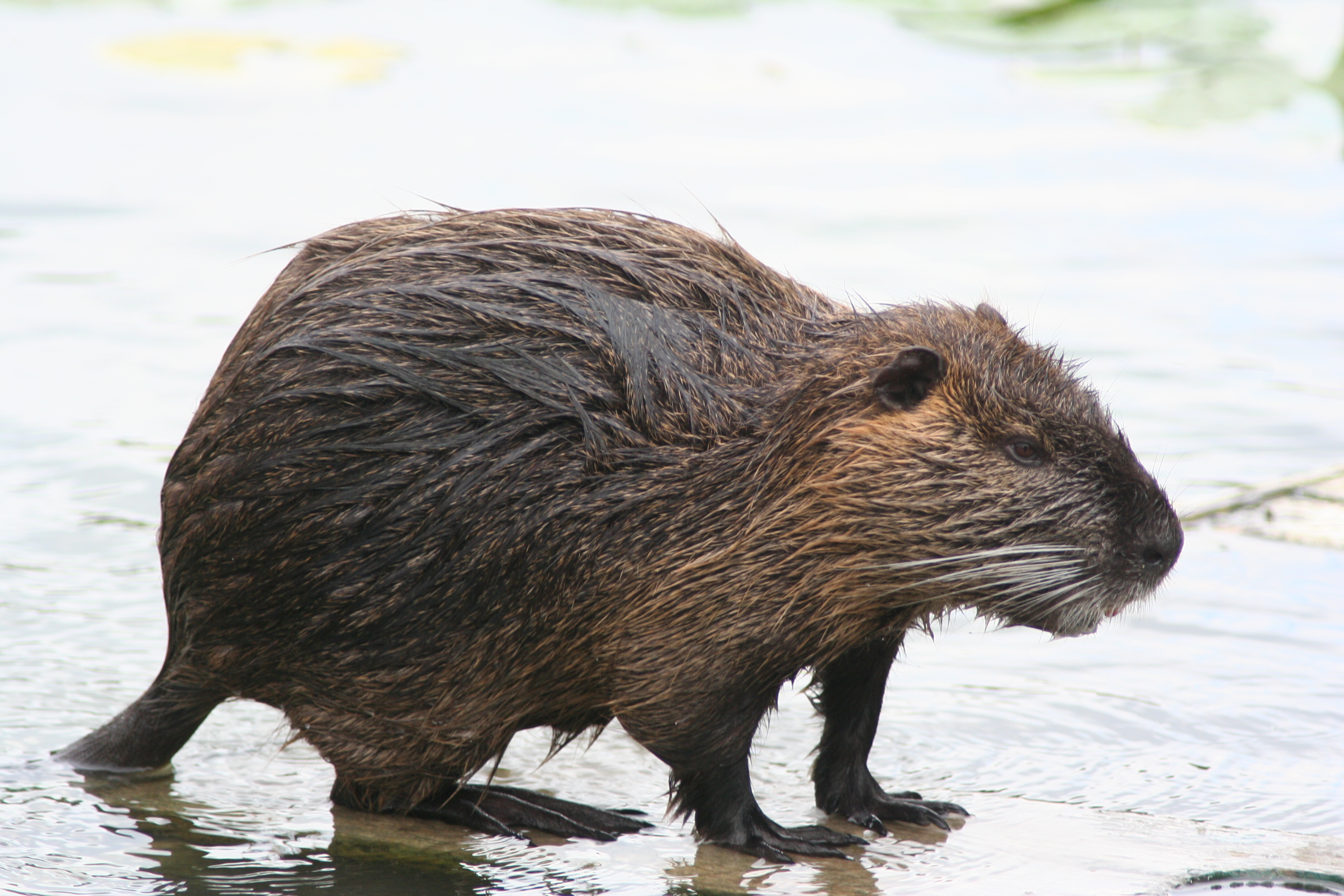
Coypu

Rodents make up the largest order of mammals, with over 40% of mammalian species. They have two incisors in the upper and lower jaw which grow continually and must be kept short by gnawing. Most rodents are small, although the capybara can weigh up to 45 kg (100 lb). South America's rodent fauna today is largely an outgrowth of two spectacularly fortunate ancient "sweepstakes" dispersal events, each of which was followed by explosive diversification. Caviomorphs, the first rodents to reach the continent, are believed to have washed ashore after rafting across the Atlantic from Africa over 30 million years ago. More recently, ancestral sigmodontine rodents apparently island-hopped from Central America 5 million or more years ago, prior to the formation of the Panamanian land bridge. These two groups now comprise 36% and 60%, respectively, of all South American rodent species. The corresponding figures are 10% and 27% for Central America, 2% and 10% for Mexico, 0.5% and 3% for North America north of Mexico, and 72% and 27% for recent endemic Caribbean rodents. (Note: This is based on the definition of Sigmodontinae that excludes Neotominae and Tylomyinae.) Conversely, sciurids make up 3% of rodents in South America, 8% in Central America, 15% in Mexico and 31% in North America north of Mexico, while castorimorphs are 1%, 16%, 26% and 28%, respectively. Sciurids are absent from South America's southern cone, while castorimorphs are only present in northwest South America (Colombia, Venezuela and Ecuador). Illustrating the advantage of gaining a head start in colonizing a new land mass, sigmodontine rodents comprise 99.5% of all cricetid rodents in South America, but only 42% in Central America, 17% in Mexico and 7% in North America north of Mexico.

- Suborder: Hystricomorpha
  - Parvorder Caviomorpha
    - Family: Erethizontidae (New World porcupines)
      - Subfamily: Chaetomyinae
        - Genus: Chaetomys
          - Bristle-spined rat, Chaetomys subspinosus VU
      - Subfamily: Erethizontinae
        - Genus: Coendou
          - Baturite porcupine, Coendou baturitensis
          - Bicolored-spined porcupine, Coendou bicolor LC
          - Streaked dwarf porcupine, Coendou ichillus DD
          - Bahia porcupine, Coendou insidiosus LC
          - Black-tailed hairy dwarf porcupine, Coendou melanurus LC
          - Black dwarf porcupine, Coendou nycthemera DD
          - Brazilian porcupine, Coendou prehensilis LC
          - Frosted hairy dwarf porcupine, Coendou pruinosus LC
          - Andean porcupine, Coendou quichua DD
          - Roosmalen's dwarf porcupine, Coendou roosmalenorum DD
          - Rothschild's porcupine, Coendou rothschildi DD
          - Stump-tailed porcupine, Coendou rufescens LC
          - Santa Marta porcupine, Coendou sanctamartae DD
          - Dwarf porcupine, Coendou speratus EN
          - Paraguaian hairy dwarf porcupine, Coendou spinosus LC
          - Brown hairy dwarf porcupine, Coendou vestitus DD
    - Family: Chinchillidae (viscachas and chinchillas)
      - Genus: Chinchilla
        - Short-tailed chinchilla, Chinchilla chinchilla CR
        - Long-tailed chinchilla, Chinchilla lanigera CR
      - Genus: Lagidium
        - Lagidium ahuacaense
        - Northern viscacha, Lagidium peruanum LC
        - Southern viscacha, Lagidium viscacia LC
        - Wolffsohn's viscacha, Lagidium wolffsohni DD
      - Genus: Lagostomus
        - Plains viscacha, Lagostomus maximus LC
    - Family: Dinomyidae (pacarana)
      - Genus: Dinomys
        - Pacarana, Dinomys branickii VU
    - Family: Caviidae (guinea pigs and cavies)
      - Subfamily: Caviinae
        - Genus: Cavia
          - Brazilian guinea pig, Cavia aperea LC
          - Shiny guinea pig, Cavia fulgida LC
          - Santa Catarina's guinea pig, Cavia intermedia CR
          - Greater guinea pig, Cavia magna LC
          - Montane guinea pig, Cavia tschudii LC
        - Genus: Galea
          - Southern highland yellow-toothed cavy, Galea comes DD
          - Brazilian yellow-toothed cavy, Galea flavidens LC
          - Lowland yellow-toothed cavy, Galea leucoblephara LC
          - Common yellow-toothed cavy, Galea musteloides LC
            - Muenster yellow-toothed cavy, Galea m. monasteriensis NE
          - Spix's yellow-toothed cavy, Galea spixii LC
        - Genus: Microcavia
          - Southern mountain cavy, Microcavia australis LC
          - Andean mountain cavy, Microcavia niata LC
          - Shipton's mountain cavy, Microcavia shiptoni NT
      - Subfamily: Dolichotinae
        - Genus: Dolichotis
          - Patagonian mara, Dolichotis patagonum NT
          - Chacoan mara, Dolichotis salinicola LC
      - Subfamily: Hydrochoerinae (capybaras and rock cavies)
        - Genus: Hydrochoerus
          - Capybara, Hydrochoerus hydrochaeris LC
          - Lesser capybara, Hydrochoerus isthmius DD
        - Genus: Kerodon
          - Acrobatic cavy, Kerodon acrobata DD
          - Rock cavy, Kerodon rupestris LC
    - Family: Dasyproctidae (agoutis and acouchis)
      - Genus: Dasyprocta
        - Azara's agouti, Dasyprocta azarae DD
        - Crested agouti, Dasyprocta cristata DD
        - Black agouti, Dasyprocta fuliginosa LC
        - Orinoco agouti, Dasyprocta guamara NT
        - Kalinowski's agouti, Dasyprocta kalinowskii DD
        - Red-rumped agouti, Dasyprocta leporina LC
        - Black-rumped agouti, Dasyprocta prymnolopha LC
        - Central American agouti, Dasyprocta punctata LC
      - Genus: Myoprocta
        - Red acouchi, Myoprocta acouchy LC
        - Green acouchi, Myoprocta pratti LC
    - Family: Cuniculidae
      - Genus: Cuniculus
        - Cuniculus hernandezi
        - Lowland paca, Cuniculus paca LC
        - Mountain paca, Cuniculus taczanowskii NT
    - Family: Ctenomyidae (tuco-tucos)
      - Genus: Ctenomys
        - Argentine tuco-tuco, Ctenomys argentinus NT
        - Southern tuco-tuco, Ctenomys australis EN
        - Azara's tuco-tuco, Ctenomys azarae VU
        - Berg's tuco-tuco, Ctenomys bergi VU
        - Bolivian tuco-tuco, Ctenomys boliviensis LC
        - Bonetto's tuco-tuco, Ctenomys bonettoi EN
        - Brazilian tuco-tuco, Ctenomys brasiliensis DD
        - Budin's tuco-tuco, Ctenomys budini DD
        - Colburn's tuco-tuco, Ctenomys colburni DD
        - Puntilla tuco-tuco, Ctenomys coludo DD
        - Conover's tuco-tuco, Ctenomys conoveri LC
        - Coyhaique tuco-tuco, Ctenomys coyhaiquensis DD
        - D'Orbigny's tuco-tuco, Ctenomys dorbignyi NT
        - Chacoan tuco-tuco, Ctenomys dorsalis DD
        - Emily's tuco-tuco, Ctenomys emilianus NT
        - Famatina tuco-tuco, Ctenomys famosus DD
        - Flamarion's tuco-tuco, Ctenomys flamarioni EN
        - Foch's tuco-tuco, Ctenomys fochi DD
        - Lago Blanco tuco-tuco, Ctenomys fodax DD
        - Reddish tuco-tuco, Ctenomys frater LC
        - Tawny tuco-tuco, Ctenomys fulvus LC
        - Goodfellow's tuco-tuco, Ctenomys goodfellowi LC
        - Haig's tuco-tuco, Ctenomys haigi LC
        - San Juan tuco-tuco, Ctenomys johannis DD
        - Jujuy tuco-tuco, Ctenomys juris DD
        - Catamarca tuco-tuco, Ctenomys knighti DD
        - Lami tuco-tuco, Ctenomys lami VU
        - Mottled tuco-tuco, Ctenomys latro VU
        - White-toothed tuco-tuco, Ctenomys leucodon LC
        - Lewis's tuco-tuco, Ctenomys lewisi LC
        - Magellanic tuco-tuco, Ctenomys magellanicus VU
        - Maule tuco-tuco, Ctenomys maulinus LC
        - Mendoza tuco-tuco, Ctenomys mendocinus LC
        - Tiny tuco-tuco, Ctenomys minutus DD
        - Furtive tuco-tuco, Ctenomys occultus EN
        - Highland tuco-tuco, Ctenomys opimus LC
        - Reig's tuco-tuco, Ctenomys osvaldoreigi CR
        - Ctenomys paraguayensis
        - Pearson's tuco-tuco, Ctenomys pearsoni NT
        - Goya tuco-tuco, Ctenomys perrensi LC
        - Peruvian tuco-tuco, Ctenomys peruanus LC
        - Pilar tuco-tuco, Ctenomys pilarensis EN
        - San Luis tuco-tuco, Ctenomys pontifex DD
        - Porteous's tuco-tuco, Ctenomys porteousi NT
        - Pundt's tuco-tuco, Ctenomys pundti VU
        - Rio Negro tuco-tuco, Ctenomys rionegrensis EN
        - Roig's tuco-tuco, Ctenomys roigi CR
        - Salta tuco-tuco, Ctenomys saltarius DD
        - Scaglia's tuco-tuco, Ctenomys scagliai DD
        - Silky tuco-tuco, Ctenomys sericeus DD
        - Social tuco-tuco, Ctenomys sociabilis CR
        - Steinbach's tuco-tuco, Ctenomys steinbachi LC
        - Forest tuco-tuco, Ctenomys sylvanus DD
        - Talas tuco-tuco, Ctenomys talarum LC
        - Collared tuco-tuco, Ctenomys torquatus LC
        - Robust tuco-tuco, Ctenomys tuconax DD
        - Tucuman tuco-tuco, Ctenomys tucumanus DD
        - Sierra Tontal tuco-tuco, Ctenomys tulduco DD
        - Strong tuco-tuco, Ctenomys validus DD
        - Vipos tuco-tuco, Ctenomys viperinus DD
        - Yolanda's tuco-tuco, Ctenomys yolandae DD
    - Family: Octodontidae
      - Genus: Aconaemys
        - Chilean rock rat, Aconaemys fuscus LC
        - Porter's rock rat, Aconaemys porteri DD
        - Sage's rock rat, Aconaemys sagei DD
      - Genus: Octodon
        - Bridges's degu, Octodon bridgesi VU
        - Common degu, Octodon degus LC
        - Moon-toothed degu, Octodon lunatus VU
        - Pacific degu, Octodon pacificus CR
      - Genus: Octodontomys
        - Mountain degu, Octodontomys gliroides LC
      - Genus: Octomys
        - Mountain viscacha rat, Octomys mimax LC
      - Genus: Pipanacoctomys
        - Golden viscacha rat, Pipanacoctomys aureus CR
      - Genus: Spalacopus
        - Coruro, Spalacopus cyanus LC
      - Genus: Tympanoctomys
        - Plains viscacha rat, Tympanoctomys barrerae NT
        - Kirchner's viscacha rat, Tympanoctomys kirchnerorum DD
        - Chalchalero viscacha rat, Tympanoctomys loschalchalerosorum CR
    - Family: Abrocomidae
      - Genus: Abrocoma
        - Bennett's chinchilla rat, Abrocoma bennettii LC
        - Bolivian chinchilla rat, Abrocoma boliviensis CR
        - Budin's chinchilla rat, Abrocoma budini DD
        - Ashy chinchilla rat, Abrocoma cinerea LC
        - Famatina chinchilla rat, Abrocoma famatina DD
        - Sierra del Tontal chinchilla rat, Abrocoma schistacea DD
        - Uspallata chinchilla rat, Abrocoma uspallata DD
        - Punta de Vacas chinchilla rat, Abrocoma vaccarum DD
    - Family: Echimyidae (spiny rats and allies)
      - Subfamily: Dactylomyinae
        - Genus: Kannabateomys
          - Atlantic bamboo rat, Kannabateomys amblyonyx LC
        - Genus: Dactylomys
          - Bolivian bamboo rat, Dactylomys boliviensis LC
          - Amazon bamboo rat, Dactylomys dactylinus LC
          - Montane bamboo rat, Dactylomys peruanus DD
        - Genus: Olallamys
          - White-tailed olalla rat, Olallamys albicauda DD
          - Greedy olalla rat, Olallamys edax DD
      - Subfamily: Echimyinae
        - Genus: Callistomys
          - Painted tree-rat, Callistomys pictus EN
        - Genus: Diplomys
          - Colombian soft-furred spiny rat, Diplomys caniceps DD
          - Rufous soft-furred spiny rat, Diplomys labilis LC
        - Genus: Echimys
          - White-faced spiny tree-rat, Echimys chrysurus LC
          - Dark spiny tree-rat, Echimys saturnus DD
          - Echimys vieirai DD
        - Genus: Isothrix
          - Isothrix barbarabrownae DD
          - Yellow-crowned brush-tailed rat, Isothrix bistriata LC
          - Rio Negro brush-tailed rat, Isothrix negrensis LC
          - Plain brush-tailed rat, Isothrix pagurus LC
          - Sinnamary brush-tailed rat, Isothrix sinnamariensis LC
        - Genus: Makalata
          - Makalata castaneus
          - Brazilian spiny tree-rat, Makalata didelphoides LC
          - Makalata handleyi
          - Makalata guianae
          - Makalata longirostris
          - Long-tailed armored tree-rat, Makalata macrura LC
          - Dusky spiny tree-rat, Makalata obscura DD
          - Peruvian tree-rat, Makalata rhipidura DD
        - Genus: Pattonomys
          - Bare-tailed armored tree-rat, Pattonomys occasius DD
          - Speckled spiny tree-rat, Pattonomys semivillosus LC
        - Genus: Phyllomys
          - Golden Atlantic tree-rat, Phyllomys blainvilii LC
          - Orange-brown Atlantic tree-rat, Phyllomys brasiliensis EN
          - Drab Atlantic tree-rat, Phyllomys dasythrix LC
          - Kerr's Atlantic tree-rat, Phyllomys kerri DD
          - Pallid Atlantic tree-rat, Phyllomys lamarum DD
          - Lund's Atlantic tree-rat, Phyllomys lundi EN
          - Mantiqueira Atlantic tree-rat, Phyllomys mantiqueirensis CR
          - Long-furred Atlantic tree-rat, Phyllomys medius LC
          - Black-spined Atlantic tree-rat, Phyllomys nigrispinus LC
          - Rusty-sided Atlantic tree-rat, Phyllomys pattoni LC
          - Phyllomys sulinus
          - Giant Atlantic tree-rat, Phyllomys thomasi EN
          - Short-furred Atlantic tree-rat, Phyllomys unicolor CR
        - Genus: Santamartamys
          - Red-crested tree-rat, Santamartamys rufodorsalis CR
        - Genus: Toromys
          - Giant tree-rat, Toromys grandis LC
      - Subfamily: Eumysopinae
        - Genus: Carterodon
          - Owl's spiny rat, Carterodon sulcidens DD
        - Genus: Clyomys
          - Broad-headed spiny rat, Clyomys laticeps LC
        - Genus: Euryzygomatomys
          - Brandt's guiara, Euryzygomatomys guiara
          - Fischer's guiara, Euryzygomatomys spinosus LC
        - Genus: Hoplomys
          - Armored rat, Hoplomys gymnurus LC
        - Genus: Lonchothrix
          - Tuft-tailed spiny tree rat, Lonchothrix emiliae LC
        - Genus: Mesomys
          - Ferreira's spiny tree-rat, Mesomys hispidus LC
          - Woolly-headed spiny tree-rat, Mesomys leniceps DD
          - Tufted-tailed spiny tree-rat, Mesomys occultus LC
          - Pará spiny tree-rat, Mesomys stimulax LC
        - Genus: Proechimys
          - Short-tailed spiny rat, Proechimys brevicauda LC
          - Colombian spiny rat, Proechimys canicollis LC
          - Boyacá spiny rat, Proechimys chrysaeolus DD
          - Cuvier's spiny rat, Proechimys cuvieri LC
          - Pacific spiny rat, Proechimys decumanus VU
          - Stiff-spine spiny rat, Proechimys echinothrix LC
          - Gardner's spiny rat, Proechimys gardneri DD
          - Goeldi's spiny rat, Proechimys goeldii VU
          - Guaira spiny rat, Proechimys guairae LC
          - Guyenne spiny rat, Proechimys guyannensis LC
          - Guyanan spiny rat, Proechimys hoplomyoides DD
          - Kulina spiny rat, Proechimys kulinae DD
          - Long-tailed spiny rat, Proechimys longicaudatus LC
          - Magdalena spiny rat, Proechimys magdalenae DD
          - Minca spiny rat, Proechimys mincae DD
          - O'Connell's spiny rat, Proechimys oconnelli DD
          - Patton's spiny rat, Proechimys pattoni LC
          - Gray-footed spiny rat, Proechimys poliopus VU
          - Napo spiny rat, Proechimys quadruplicatus LC
          - Roberto's spiny rat, Proechimys roberti VU
          - Tome's spiny rat, Proechimys semispinosus LC
          - Simon's spiny rat, Proechimys simonsi LC
          - Steere's spiny rat, Proechimys steerei LC
          - Trinidad spiny rat, Proechimys trinitatis DD
          - Sucre spiny rat, Proechimys urichi LC
        - Genus: Thrichomys
          - Common punaré, Thrichomys apereoides LC
          - Thrichomys fosteri NE
          - Highlands punaré, Thrichomys inermis LC
          - Sao Lourenço punaré, Thrichomys laurentius DD
          - Paraguayan punaré, Thrichomys pachyurus LC
        - Genus: Trinomys
          - White-spined Atlantic spiny rat, Trinomys albispinus LC
          - Soft-spined Atlantic spiny rat, Trinomys dimidiatus LC
          - Elias' Atlantic spiny rat, Trinomys eliasi EN
          - Gracile Atlantic spiny rat, Trinomys gratiosus LC
          - Ihering's Atlantic spiny rat, Trinomys iheringi LC
          - Dark-caped Atlantic spiny rat, Trinomys mirapitanga DD
          - Moojen's Atlantic spiny rat, Trinomys moojeni EN
          - Mouse-tailed Atlantic spiny rat, Trinomys myosuros LC
          - Spiked Atlantic spiny rat, Trinomys paratus DD
          - Hairy Atlantic spiny rat, Trinomys setosus LC
          - Yonenaga's Atlantic spiny rat, Trinomys yonenagae EN
    - Family: Myocastoridae (coypus)
      - Genus: Myocastor
        - Coypu, Myocastor coypus LC

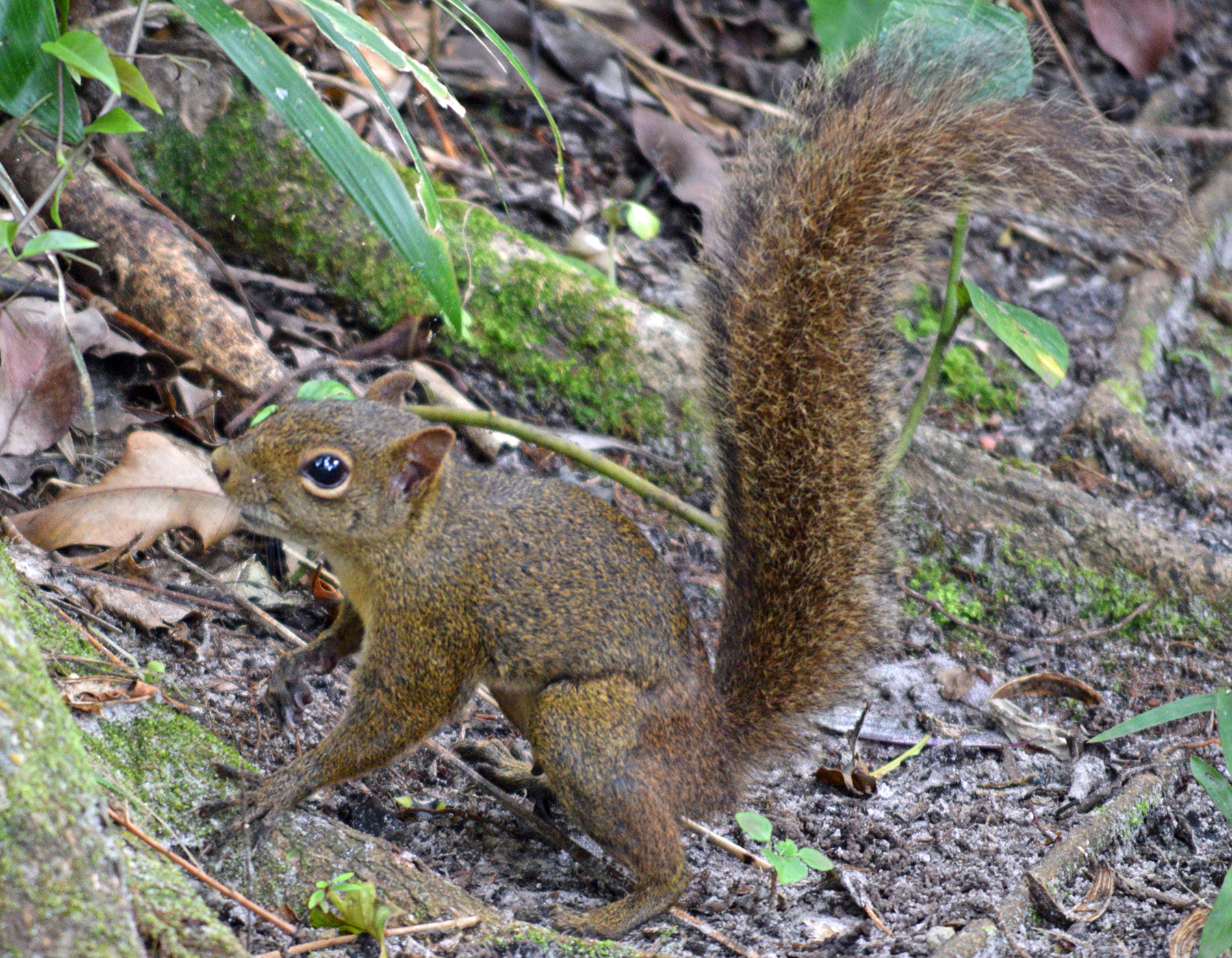
Brazilian squirrel

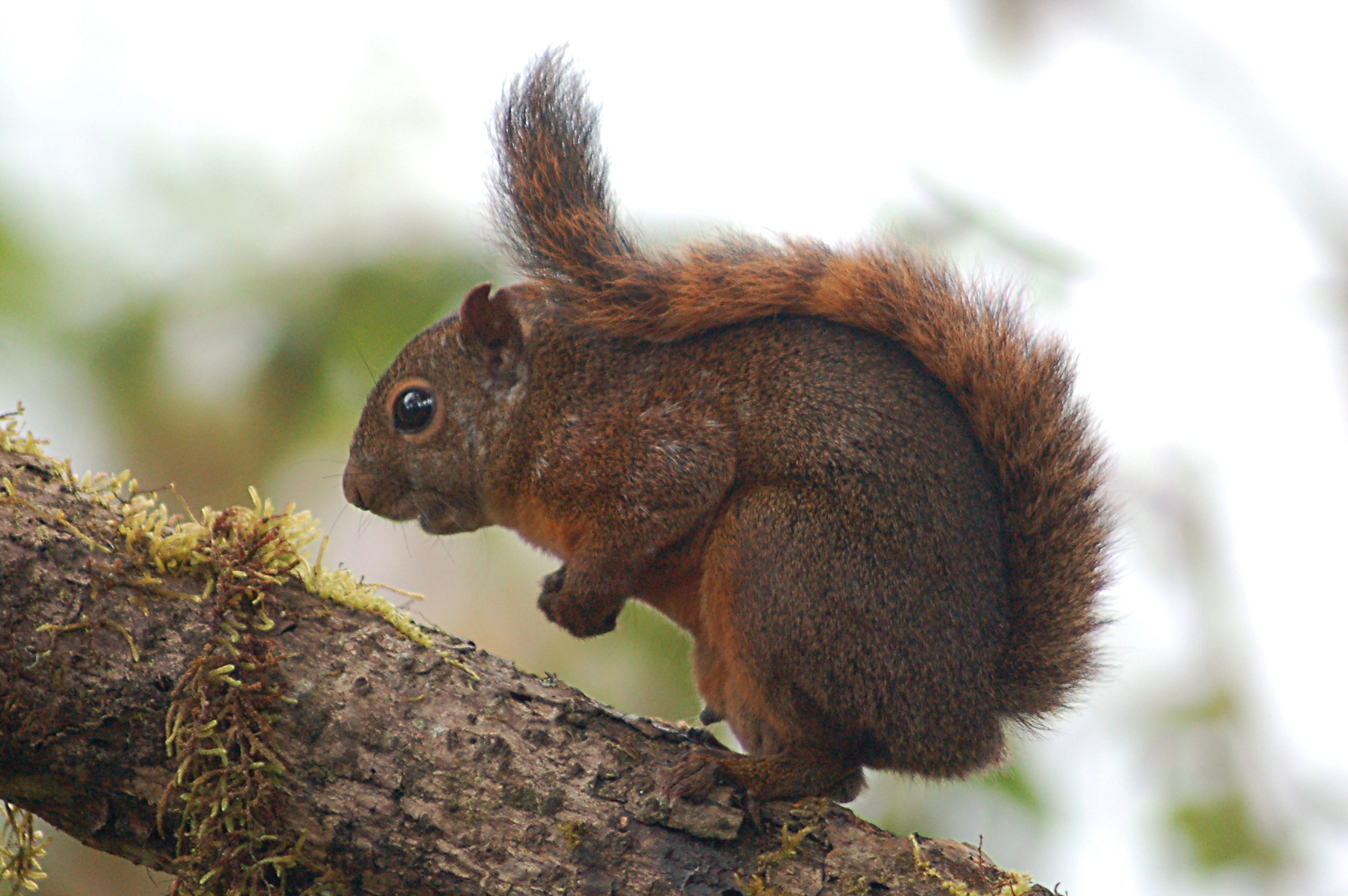
Red-tailed squirrel

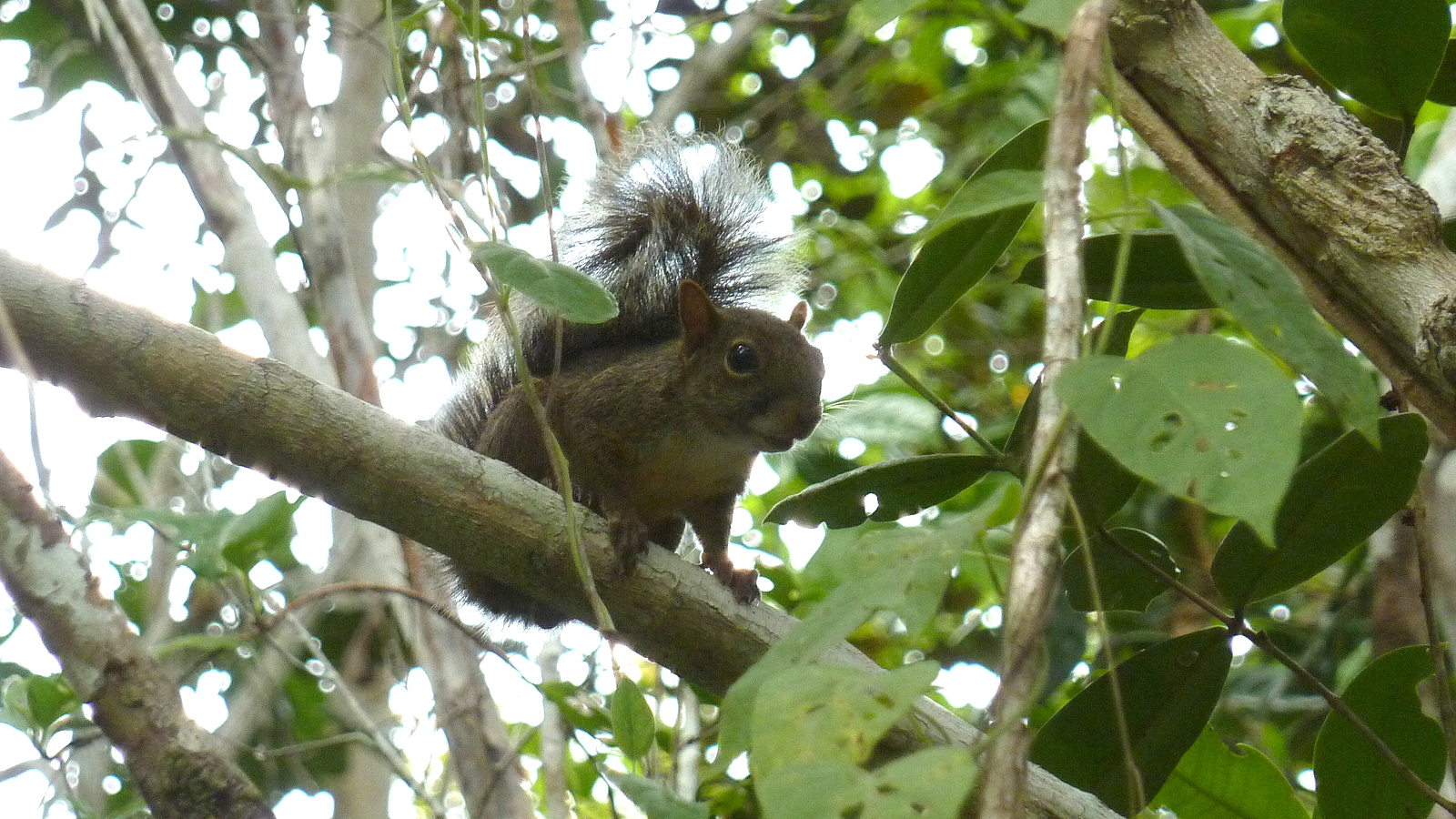
Ingram's squirrel

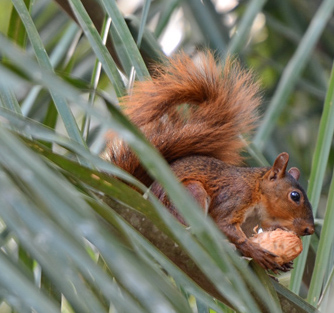
Southern Amazon red squirrel

- Suborder: Sciuromorpha
  - Family: Sciuridae (squirrels)
    - Subfamily: Sciurillinae
      - Genus: Sciurillus
        - Neotropical pygmy squirrel, Sciurillus pusillus DD
    - Subfamily: Sciurinae
      - Tribe: Sciurini
        - Genus: Microsciurus
          - Central American dwarf squirrel, Microsciurus alfari LC
          - Amazon dwarf squirrel, Microsciurus flaviventer DD
          - Western dwarf squirrel, Microsciurus mimulus LC
          - Santander dwarf squirrel, Microsciurus santanderensis DD
        - Genus: Sciurus
          - Brazilian squirrel, Sciurus aestuans LC
          - South Yungas red squirrel, Sciurus argentinius
          - Fiery squirrel, Sciurus flammifer DD
          - Yellow-throated squirrel, Sciurus gilvigularis DD
          - Red-tailed squirrel, Sciurus granatensis LC
          - Bolivian squirrel, Sciurus ignitus DD
          - Northern Amazon red squirrel, Sciurus igniventris LC
          - Atlantic Forest squirrel, Sciurus ingrami
          - Andean squirrel, Sciurus pucheranii DD
          - Junín red squirrel, Sciurus pyrrhinus DD
          - Sanborn's squirrel, Sciurus sanborni DD
          - Southern Amazon red squirrel, Sciurus spadiceus LC
          - Guayaquil squirrel, Sciurus stramineus LC
- Suborder: Castorimorpha
  - Family: Geomyidae
    - Genus: Orthogeomys
      - Thaeler's pocket gopher, Orthogeomys thaeleri LC
  - Family: Heteromyidae
    - Subfamily: Heteromyinae
      - Genus: Heteromys
        - Trinidad spiny pocket mouse, Heteromys anomalus LC
        - Southern spiny pocket mouse, Heteromys australis LC
        - Overlook spiny pocket mouse, Heteromys catopterius NE
        - Desmarest's spiny pocket mouse, Heteromys desmarestianus LC
        - Paraguaná spiny pocket mouse, Heteromys oasicus EN
        - Ecuadoran spiny pocket mouse, Heteromys teleus VU

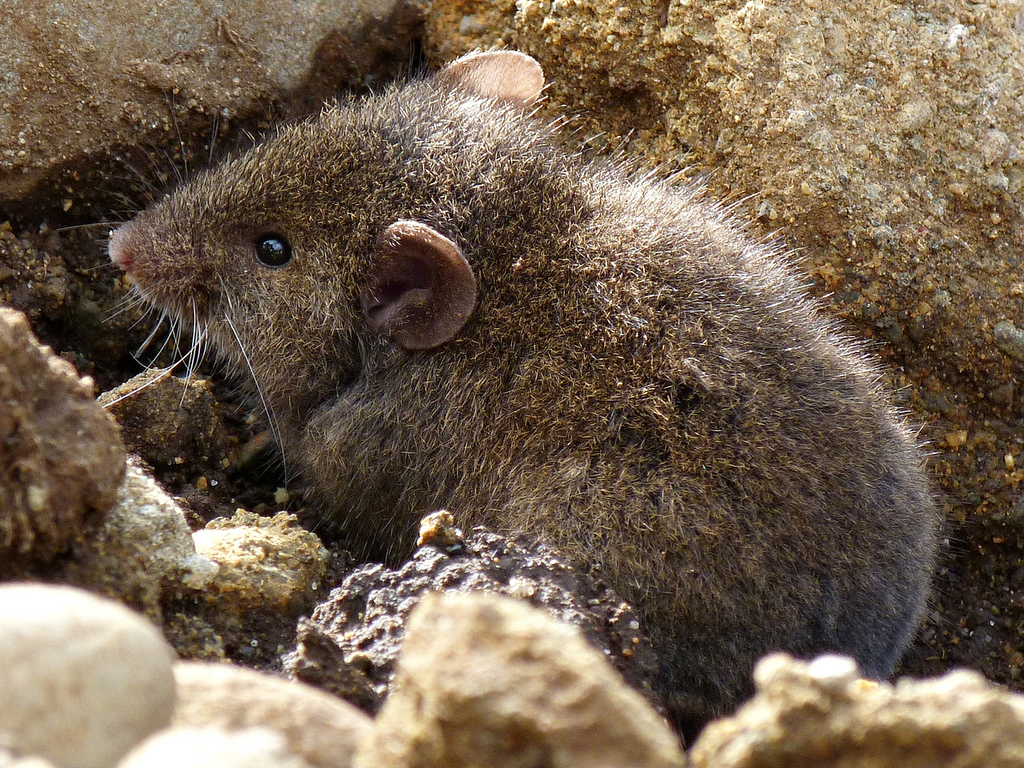
Sanborn's grass mouse

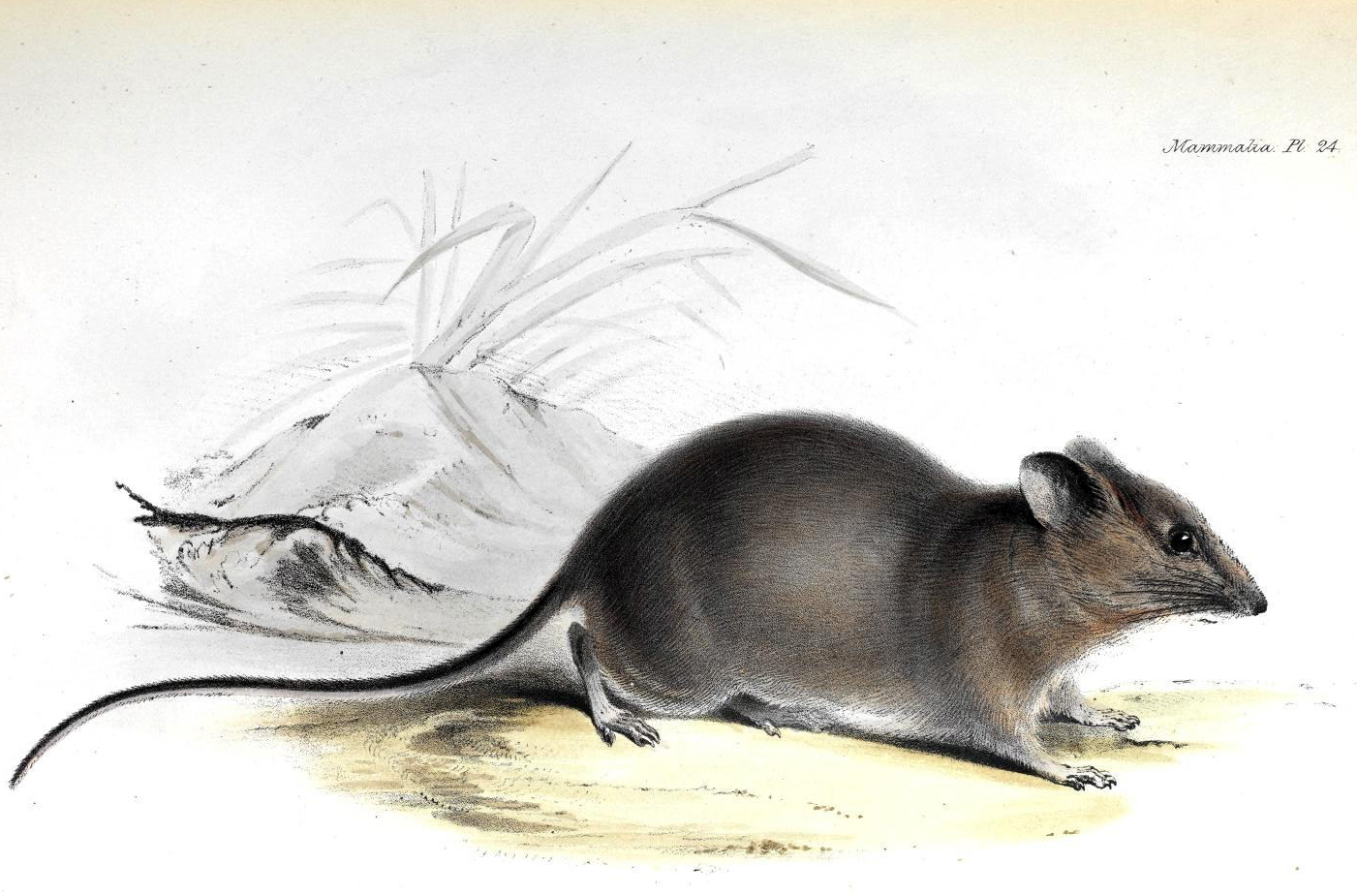
Galápagos rice rat

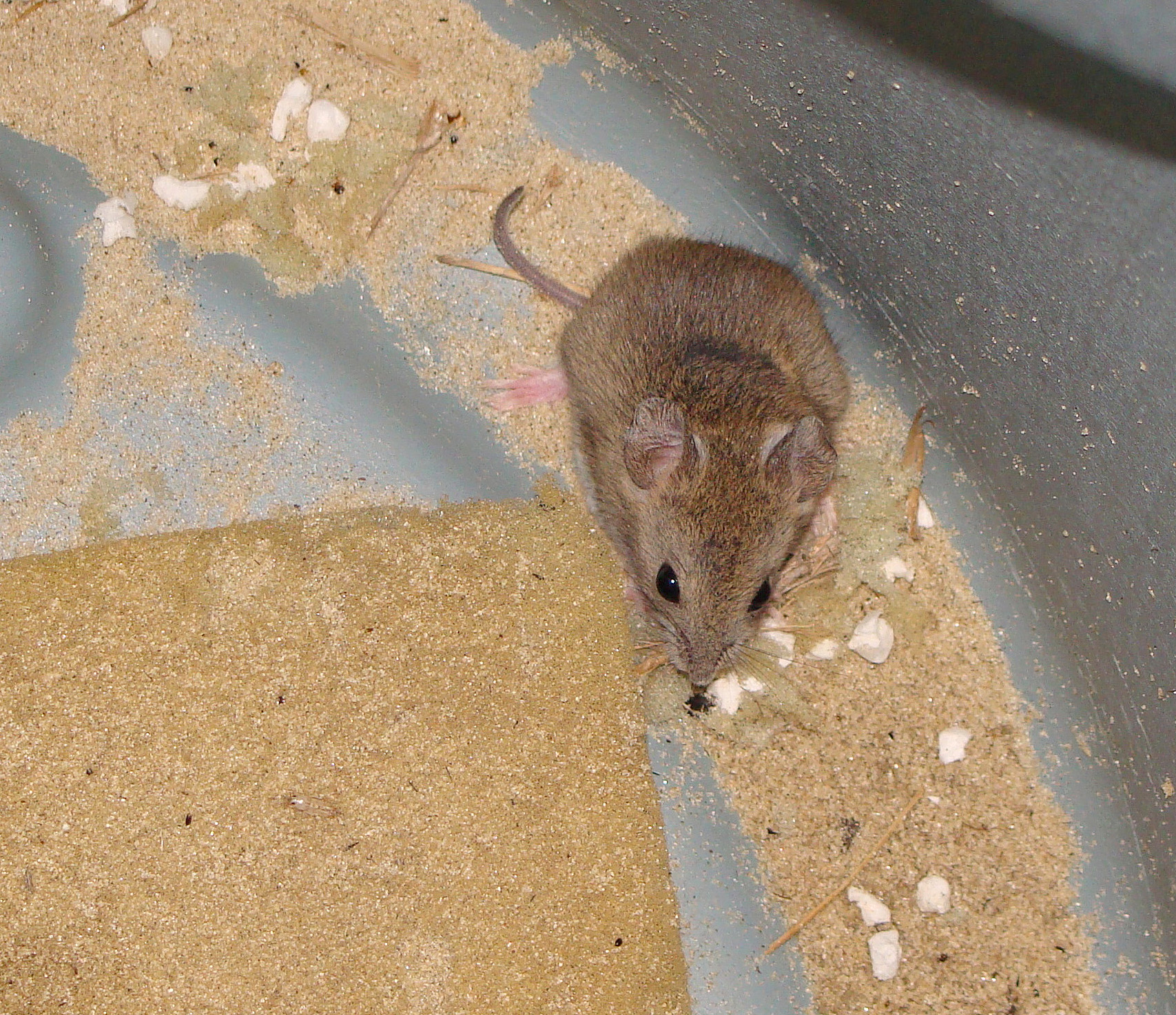
Small vesper mouse

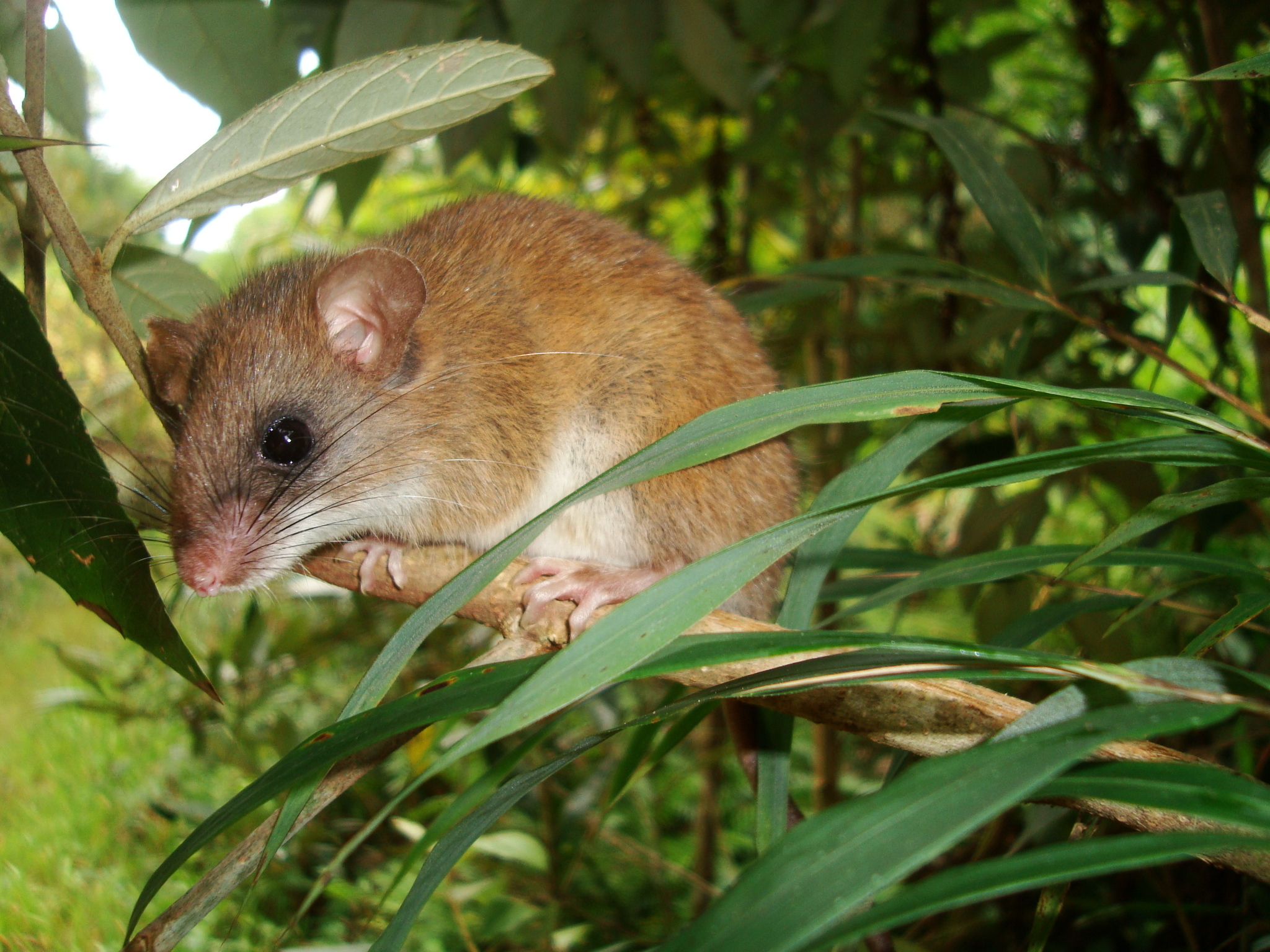
Drymoreomys albimaculatus

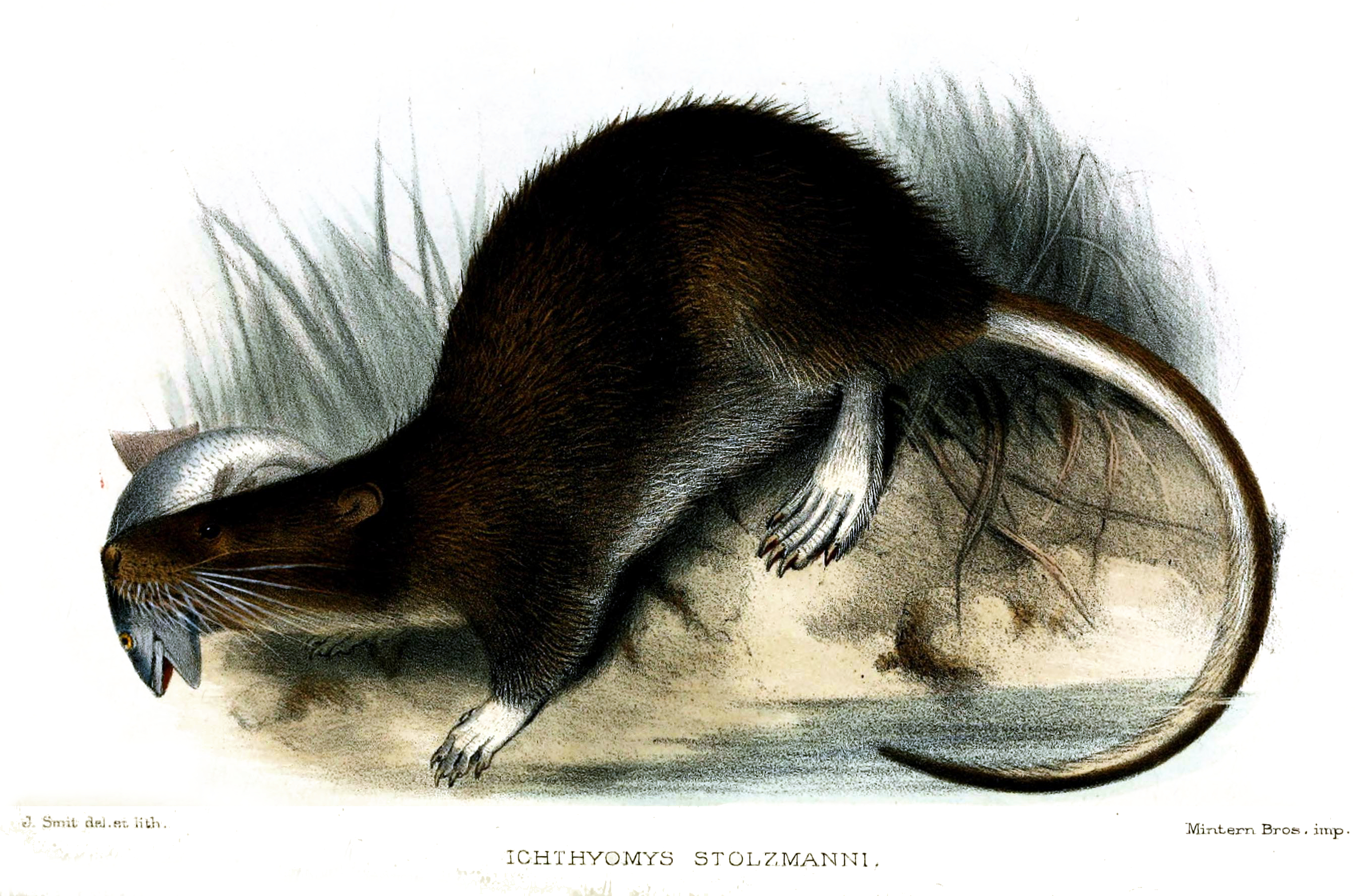
Stolzmann's crab-eating rat

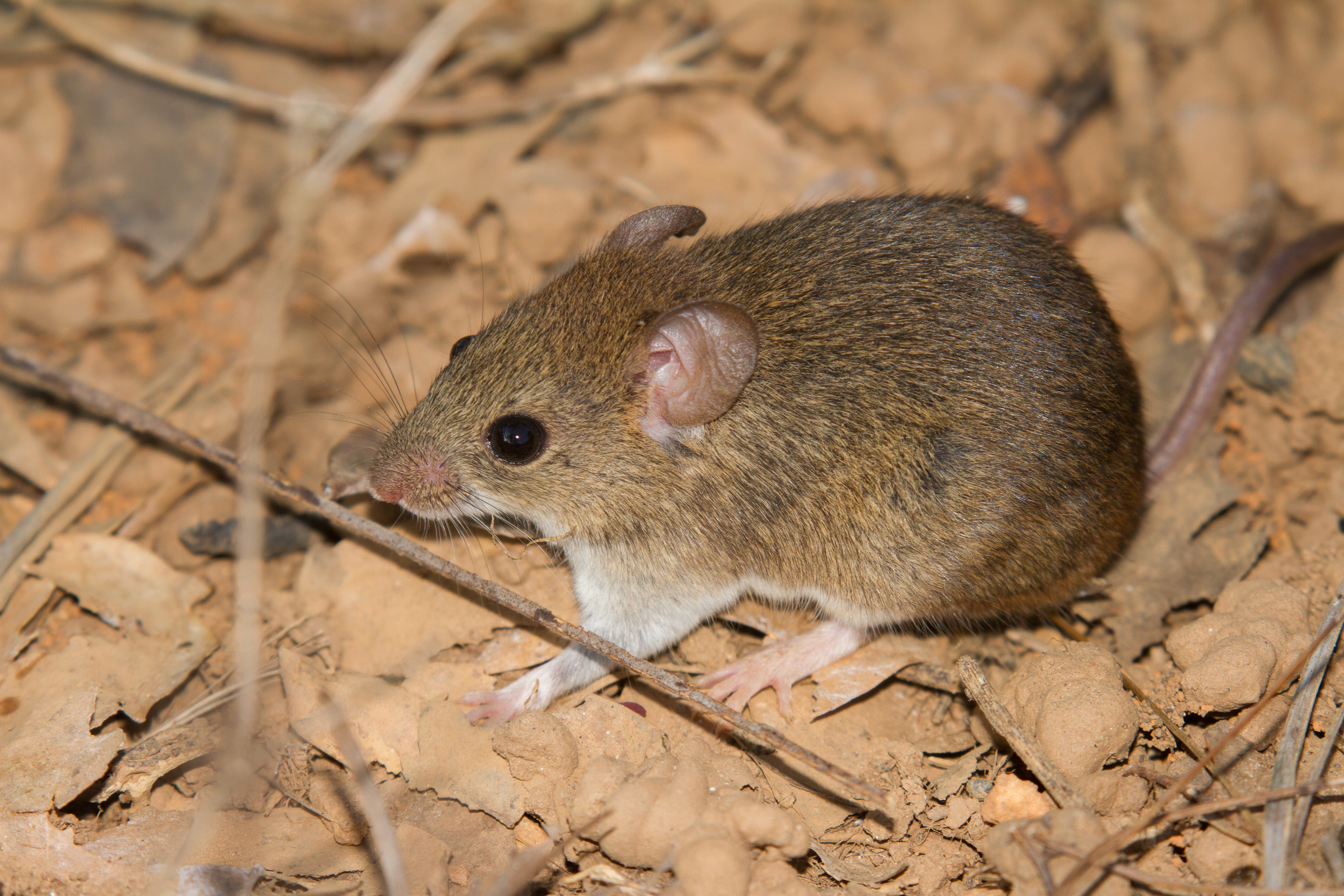
Hairy-tailed bolo mouse

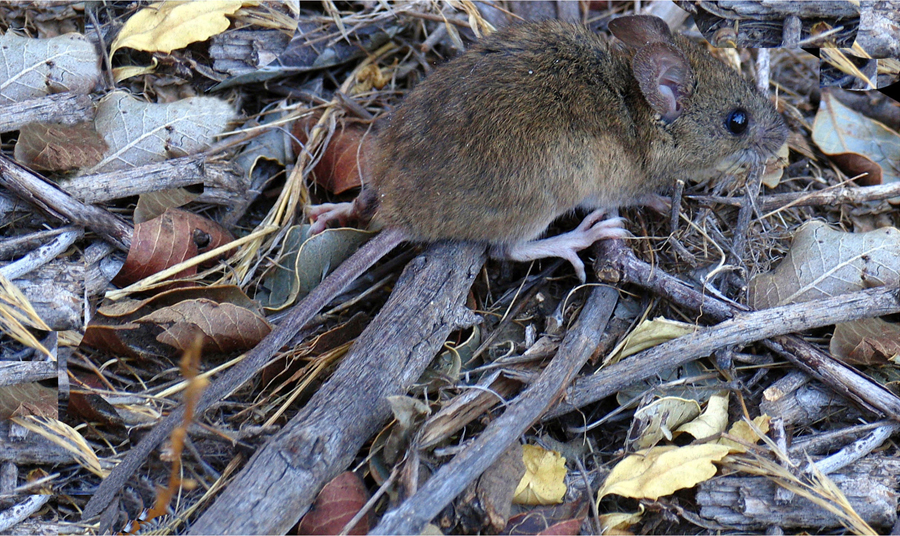
Long-tailed pygmy rice rat

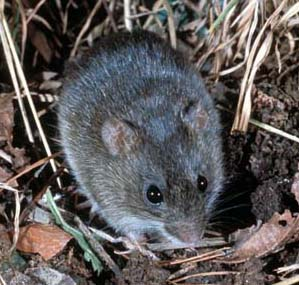
Marsh rice rat (close relative of Coues's rice rat)

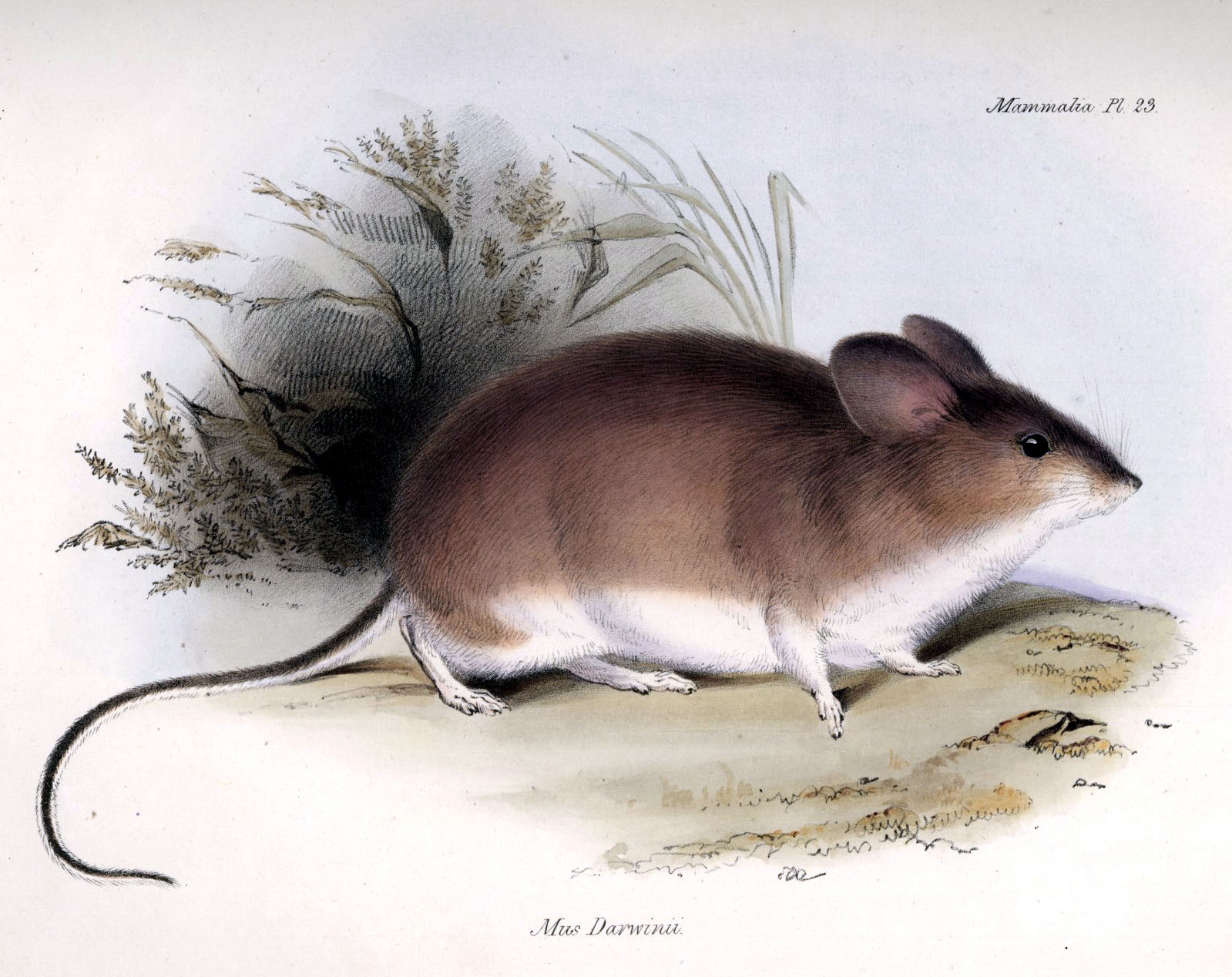
Darwin's leaf-eared mouse

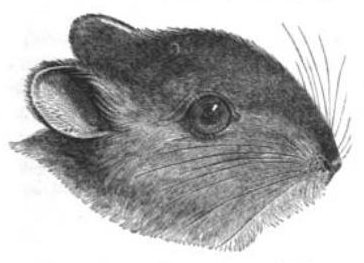
Bunny rat

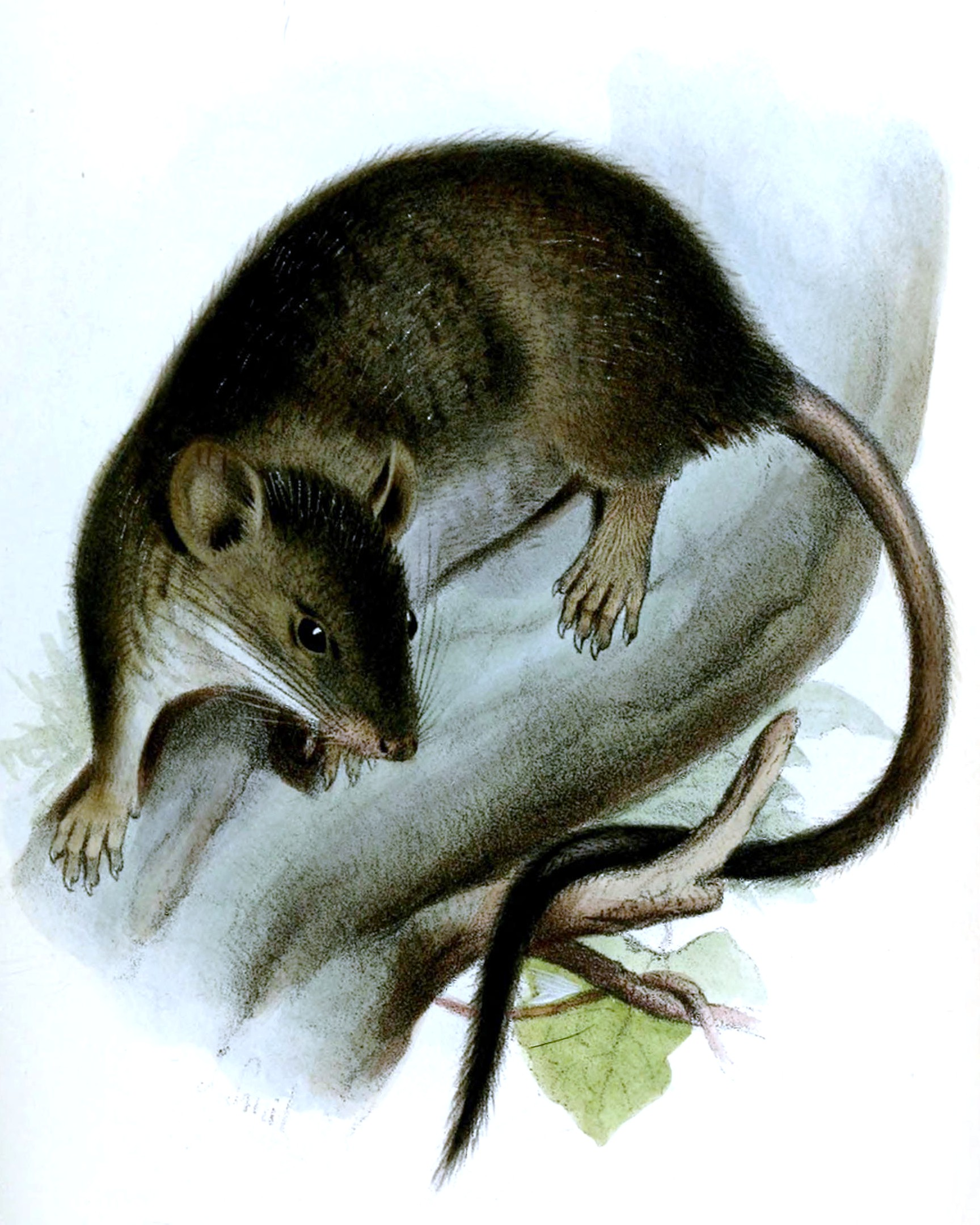
White-footed climbing mouse

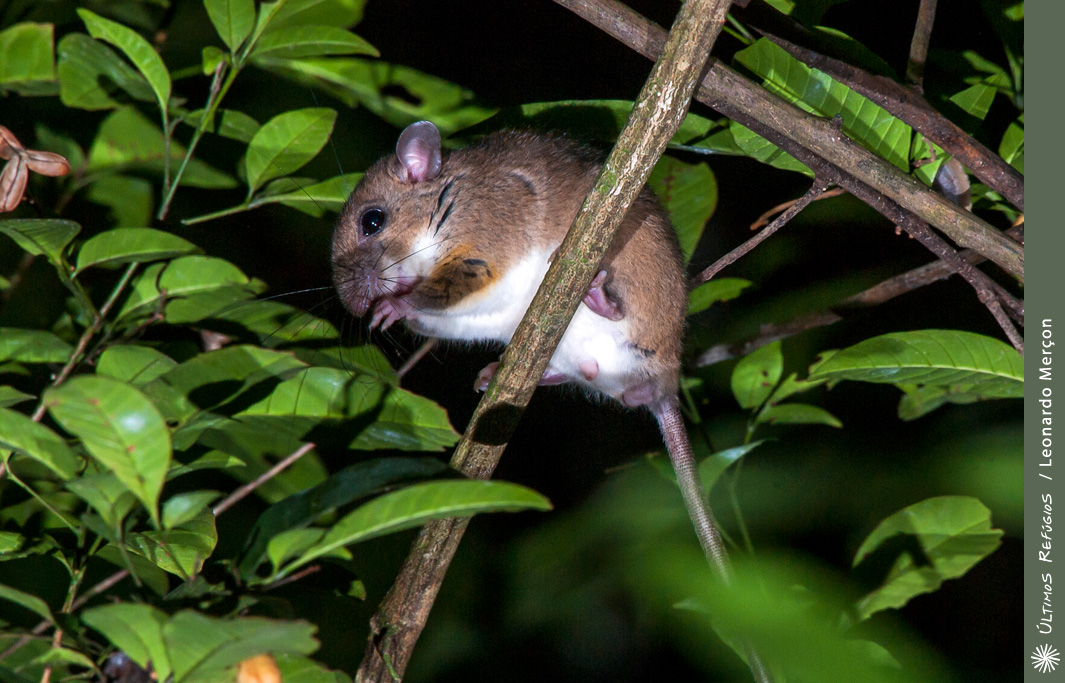
Atlantic Forest climbing mouse

- Suborder: Myomorpha
  - Family: Cricetidae
    - Subfamily: Tylomyinae
      - Genus: Tylomys
        - Mira climbing rat, Tylomys mirae LC
    - Subfamily: Neotominae
      - Genus: Reithrodontomys
        - Mexican harvest mouse, Reithrodontomys mexicanus LC
    - Subfamily: Sigmodontinae
      - Genus: Abrawayaomys
        - Abrawayaomys chebezi
        - Ruschi's rat, Abrawayaomys ruschii LC
      - Genus: Abrothrix
        - Andean Altiplano mouse, Abrothrix andinus LC
        - Hershkovitz's grass mouse, Abrothrix hershkovitzi LC
        - Gray grass mouse, Abrothrix illuteus NT
        - Jelski's Altiplano mouse, Abrothrix jelskii LC
        - Woolly grass mouse, Abrothrix lanosus LC
        - Long-haired grass mouse, Abrothrix longipilis LC
        - Olive grass mouse, Abrothrix olivaceus LC
        - Sanborn's grass mouse, Abrothrix sanborni NT
      - Genus: Aepeomys
        - Olive montane mouse, Aepeomys lugens LC
        - Reig's montane mouse, Aepeomys reigi VU
      - Genus: Aegialomys
        - Galápagos rice rat, Aegialomys galapagoensis VU
        - Yellowish rice rat, Aegialomys xanthaeolus LC
      - Genus: Akodon
        - Highland grass mouse, Akodon aerosus LC
        - Colombian grass mouse, Akodon affinis LC
        - White-bellied grass mouse, Akodon albiventer LC
        - Azara's grass mouse, Akodon azarae LC
        - Bogotá grass mouse, Akodon bogotensis LC
        - Bolivian grass mouse, Akodon boliviensis LC
        - Budin's grass mouse, Akodon budini LC
        - Akodon caenosus
        - Cursor grass mouse, Akodon cursor LC
        - Day's grass mouse, Akodon dayi LC
        - Dolorous grass mouse, Akodon dolores LC
        - Smoky grass mouse, Akodon fumeus LC
        - Akodon glaucinus
        - Intelligent grass mouse, Akodon iniscatus LC
        - Junín grass mouse, Akodon juninensis LC
        - Koford's grass mouse, Akodon kofordi LC
        - Ecuadorian grass mouse, Akodon latebricola VU
        - Lindbergh's grass mouse, Akodon lindberghi DD
        - Altiplano grass mouse, Akodon lutescens LC
        - Thespian grass mouse, Akodon mimus LC
        - Soft grass mouse, Akodon mollis LC
        - Montane grass mouse, Akodon montensis LC
        - Caparaó grass mouse, Akodon mystax DD
        - Neuquén grass mouse, Akodon neocenus DD
        - El Dorado grass mouse, Akodon orophilus LC
        - Paraná grass mouse, Akodon paranaensis LC
        - Tarija akodont, Akodon pervalens DD
        - Philip Myers's akodont, Akodon philipmyersi DD
        - Akodon polopi
        - Reig's grass mouse, Akodon reigi LC
        - São Paulo grass mouse, Akodon sanctipaulensis DD
        - Serra do Mar grass mouse, Akodon serrensis LC
        - Cochabamba grass mouse, Akodon siberiae NT
        - White-throated grass mouse, Akodon simulator LC
        - Spegazzini's grass mouse, Akodon spegazzinii LC
        - Puno grass mouse, Akodon subfuscus LC
        - Silent grass mouse, Akodon surdus VU
        - Forest grass mouse, Akodon sylvanus LC
        - Akodon tartareus
        - Chaco grass mouse, Akodon toba LC
        - Cloud forest grass mouse, Akodon torques LC
        - Variable grass mouse, Akodon varius DD
      - Genus: Amphinectomys
        - Ucayali water rat, Amphinectomys savamis DD
      - Genus: Andalgalomys
        - Olrog's chaco mouse, Andalgalomys olrogi LC
        - Pearson's chaco mouse, Andalgalomys pearsoni LC
      - Genus: Andinomys
        - Andean mouse, Andinomys edax LC
        - Andinomys lineicaudatus
      - Genus: Anotomys
        - Aquatic rat, Anotomys leander VU
      - Genus: Auliscomys
        - Bolivian big-eared mouse, Auliscomys boliviensis LC
        - Painted big-eared mouse, Auliscomys pictus LC
        - Andean big-eared mouse, Auliscomys sublimis LC
      - Genus: Bibimys
        - Chaco crimson-nosed rat, Bibimys chacoensis LC
        - Large-lipped crimson-nosed rat, Bibimys labiosus LC
        - Torres' crimson-nosed rat, Bibimys torresi NT
      - Genus: Blarinomys
        - Brazilian shrew-mouse, Blarinomys breviceps LC
      - Genus: Brucepattersonius
        - Gray-bellied brucie, Brucepattersonius griserufescens DD
        - Guaraní brucie, Brucepattersonius guarani DD
        - Red-bellied brucie, Brucepattersonius igniventris DD
        - Ihering's hocicudo, Brucepattersonius iheringi LC
        - Misiones brucie, Brucepattersonius misionensis DD
        - Arroyo of Paradise brucie, Brucepattersonius paradisus DD
        - Soricine brucie, Brucepattersonius soricinus DD
      - Genus: Calomys
        - Bolivian vesper mouse, Calomys boliviae LC
        - Crafty vesper mouse, Calomys callidus LC
        - Large vesper mouse, Calomys callosus LC
        - Calomys cerqueirai
        - Caatinga vesper mouse, Calomys expulsus LC
        - Fecund vesper mouse, Calomys fecundus LC
        - Hummelinck's vesper mouse, Calomys hummelincki VU
        - Small vesper mouse, Calomys laucha LC
        - Andean vesper mouse, Calomys lepidus LC
        - Drylands vesper mouse, Calomys musculinus LC
        - Peruvian vesper mouse, Calomys sorellus LC
        - Delicate vesper mouse, Calomys tener LC
        - Tocantins vesper mouse, Calomys tocantinsi LC
        - Córdoba vesper mouse, Calomys venustus LC
      - Genus: Cerradomys
        - Langguth's rice rat, Cerradomys langguthi
        - Maracaju rice rat, Cerradomys maracajuensis LC
        - Marinho's rice rat, Cerradomys marinhus DD
        - Lindbergh's rice rat, Cerradomys scotti LC
        - Terraced rice rat, Cerradomys subflavus LC
        - Vivo's rice rat, Cerradomys vivoi
      - Genus: Chelemys
        - Magellanic long-clawed mouse, Chelemys delfini DD
        - Andean long-clawed mouse, Chelemys macronyx LC
        - Large long-clawed mouse, Chelemys megalonyx NT
      - Genus: Chibchanomys
        - Las Cajas water mouse, Chibchanomys orcesi DD
        - Chibchan water mouse, Chibchanomys trichotis DD
      - Genus: Chilomys
        - Colombian forest mouse, Chilomys instans LC
      - Genus: Chinchillula
        - Altiplano chinchilla mouse, Chinchillula sahamae LC
      - Genus: Delomys
        - Delomys altimontanus
        - Montane Atlantic Forest rat, Delomys collinus LC
        - Striped Atlantic Forest rat, Delomys dorsalis LC
        - Pallid Atlantic Forest rat, Delomys sublineatus LC
      - Genus: Deltamys
        - Kemp's grass mouse, Deltamys kempi LC
      - Genus: Drymoreomys
        - Drymoreomys albimaculatus NT
      - Genus: Eligmodontia
        - Eligmodontia bolsonensis
        - Eligmodontia hirtipes
        - Monte gerbil mouse, Eligmodontia moreni LC
        - Morgan's gerbil mouse, Eligmodontia morgani LC
        - Andean gerbil mouse, Eligmodontia puerulus LC
        - Highland gerbil mouse, eastern Patagonian gerbil mouse, Eligmodontia typus LC
      - Genus: Eremoryzomys
        - Gray rice rat, Eremoryzomys polius DD
      - Genus: Euneomys
        - Patagonian chinchilla mouse, Euneomys chinchilloides DD
        - Burrowing chinchilla mouse, Euneomys fossor DD
        - Biting chinchilla mouse, Euneomys mordax LC
        - Peterson's chinchilla mouse, Euneomys petersoni LC
      - Genus: Euryoryzomys
        - Emmons's rice rat, Euryoryzomys emmonsae DD
        - Monster rice rat, Euryoryzomys lamia EN
        - Tarija rice rat, Euryoryzomys legatus LC
        - MacConnell's rice rat, Euryoryzomys macconnelli LC
        - Elegant rice rat, Euryoryzomys nitidus LC
        - Russet rice rat, Euryoryzomys russatus LC
      - Genus: Galenomys
        - Garlepp's mouse, Galenomys garleppi DD
      - Genus: Geoxus
        - Long-clawed mole mouse, Geoxus valdivianus LC
      - Genus: Graomys
        - Graomys chacoensis (contains the former Graomys centralis)
        - Pale leaf-eared mouse, Graomys domorum LC
        - Edith's leaf-eared mouse, Graomys edithae DD
        - Gray leaf-eared mouse, Graomys griseoflavus LC
      - Genus: Gyldenstolpia
        - Fossorial giant rat, Gyldenstolpia fronto EN
        - Gyldenstolpia planaltensis
      - Genus: Handleyomys
        - Alfaro's rice rat, Handleyomys alfaroi LC
        - Dusky montane mouse, Handleyomys fuscatus LC
        - Colombian rice rat, Handleyomys intectus LC
      - Genus: Holochilus
        - Web-footed marsh rat, Holochilus brasiliensis LC
        - Chaco marsh rat, Holochilus chacarius LC
        - Amazonian marsh rat, Holochilus sciureus LC
      - Genus: Hylaeamys
        - Hylaeamys acritus DD
        - Large-headed rice rat, Hylaeamys laticeps NT
        - Azara's broad-headed rice rat, Hylaeamys megacephalus LC
        - Sowbug rice rat, Hylaeamys oniscus VU
        - Western Amazonian oryzomys, Hylaeamys perenensis LC
        - Tate's rice rat, Hylaeamys tatei DD
        - Yungas rice rat, Hylaeamys yunganus LC
      - Genus: Ichthyomys
        - Crab-eating rat, Ichthyomys hydrobates NT
        - Pittier's crab-eating rat, Ichthyomys pittieri VU
        - Stolzmann's crab-eating rat, Ichthyomys stolzmanni DD
        - Tweedy's crab-eating rat, Ichthyomys tweedii DD
      - Genus: Irenomys
        - Chilean climbing mouse, Irenomys tarsalis LC
      - Genus: Juliomys
        - Juliomys ossitenuis NE
        - Lesser Wilfred's mouse, Juliomys pictipes LC
        - Cleft-headed juliomys, Juliomys rimofrons VU
        - Aracuaria Forest tree mouse, Juliomys ximenezi NE
      - Genus: Juscelinomys
        - Rio Guaporé mouse, Juscelinomys guaporensis DD
        - Huanchaca mouse, Juscelinomys huanchacae DD
      - Genus: Kunsia
        - Woolly giant rat, Kunsia tomentosus LC
      - Genus: Lenoxus
        - Andean rat, Lenoxus apicalis LC
      - Genus: Loxodontomys
        - Southern big-eared mouse, Loxodontomys micropus LC
        - Pikumche pericote, Loxodontomys pikumche LC
      - Genus: Lundomys
        - Lund's amphibious rat, Lundomys molitor LC
      - Genus: Melanomys
        - Dusky rice rat, Melanomys caliginosus LC
        - Robust dark rice rat, Melanomys robustulus LC
        - Zuniga's dark rice rat, Melanomys zunigae CR
      - Genus: Microakodontomys
        - Intermediate lesser grass mouse, Microakodontomys transitorius VU
      - Genus: Microryzomys
        - Highland small rice rat, Microryzomys altissimus LC
        - Forest small rice rat, Microryzomys minutus LC
      - Genus: Mindomys
        - Hammond's rice rat, Mindomys hammondi EN
      - Genus: Neacomys
        - Dubost's bristly mouse, Neacomys dubosti LC
        - Guiana bristly mouse, Neacomys guianae LC
        - Jurua bristly mouse, Neacomys minutus LC
        - Musser's bristly mouse, Neacomys musseri LC
        - Paracou bristly mouse, Neacomys paracou LC
        - Common bristly mouse, Neacomys spinosus LC
        - Narrow-footed bristly mouse, Neacomys tenuipes LC
      - Genus: Necromys
        - Pleasant bolo mouse, Necromys amoenus LC
        - Argentine bolo mouse, Necromys benefactus LC
        - Rufous-bellied bolo mouse, Necromys lactens LC
        - Hairy-tailed bolo mouse, Necromys lasiurus LC
        - Paraguayan bolo mouse, Necromys lenguarum LC
        - Dark bolo mouse, Necromys obscurus NT
        - Spotted bolo mouse, Necromys punctulatus DD
        - Temchuk's bolo mouse, Necromys temchuki LC
        - Northern grass mouse, Necromys urichi LC
      - Genus: Nectomys
        - Western Amazonian water rat, Nectomys apicalis LC
        - Magdalena water rat, Nectomys magdalenae DD
        - Trinidad water rat, Nectomys palmipes LC
        - Small-footed bristly mouse, Nectomys rattus LC
        - Scaly-footed water rat, Nectomys squamipes LC
      - Genus: Neotomys
        - Andean swamp rat, Neotomys ebriosus LC
      - Genus: Nephelomys
        - Tomes's rice rat, Nephelomys albigularis LC
        - Nephelomys auriventer LC
        - Costa Central rice rat, Nephelomys caracolus LC
        - Nephelomys childi
        - Keays's rice rat, Nephelomys keaysi LC
        - Light-footed rice rat, Nephelomys levipes LC
        - Nephelomys maculiventer
        - Mérida rice rat, Nephelomys meridensis LC
        - Nephelomys moerex
        - Nephelomys nimbosus
        - Nephelomys pectoralis
      - Genus: Nesoryzomys
        - Fernandina rice rat, Nesoryzomys fernandinae VU
        - Fernandina Island Galápagos mouse, Nesoryzomys narboroughi VU
        - Santiago Galápagos mouse, Nesoryzomys swarthi VU
      - Genus: Neusticomys
        - Ferreira's fish-eating rat, Neusticomys ferreirai DD
        - Montane fish-eating rat, Neusticomys monticolus LC
        - Musso's fish-eating rat, Neusticomys mussoi EN
        - Oyapock's fish-eating rat, Neusticomys oyapocki DD
        - Peruvian fish-eating rat, Neusticomys peruviensis LC
        - Venezuelan fish-eating rat, Neusticomys venezuelae VU
      - Genus: Notiomys
        - Edward's long-clawed mouse, Notiomys edwardsii LC
      - Genus: Oecomys
        - Guianan arboreal rice rat, Oecomys auyantepui LC
        - Bicolored arboreal rice rat, Oecomys bicolor LC
        - Atlantic Forest arboreal rice rat, Oecomys catherinae LC
        - Cleber's arboreal rice rat, Oecomys cleberi DD
        - Unicolored arboreal rice rat, Oecomys concolor LC
        - Yellow arboreal rice rat, Oecomys flavicans LC
        - Mamore arboreal rice rat, Oecomys mamorae LC
        - Brazilian arboreal rice rat, Oecomys paricola DD
        - Dusky arboreal rice rat, Oecomys phaeotis LC
        - King arboreal rice rat, Oecomys rex LC
        - Robert's arboreal rice rat, Oecomys roberti LC
        - Red arboreal rice rat, Oecomys rutilus LC
        - Venezuelan arboreal rice rat, Oecomys speciosus LC
        - Foothill arboreal rice rat, Oecomys superans LC
        - Oecomys sydandersoni
        - Trinidad arboreal rice rat, Oecomys trinitatis LC
      - Genus: Oligoryzomys
        - Andean pygmy rice rat, Oligoryzomys andinus LC
        - Sandy pygmy rice rat, Oligoryzomys arenalis LC
        - Brenda's colilargo, Oligoryzomys brendae DD
        - Chacoan pygmy rice rat, Oligoryzomys chacoensis LC
        - Destructive pygmy rice rat, Oligoryzomys destructor LC
        - Yellow pygmy rice rat, Oligoryzomys flavescens LC
        - Fornes' colilargo, Oligoryzomys fornesi LC
        - Fulvous pygmy rice rat, Oligoryzomys fulvescens LC
        - Grayish pygmy rice rat, Oligoryzomys griseolus LC
        - Long-tailed pygmy rice rat, Oligoryzomys longicaudatus LC
        - Magellanic pygmy rice rat, Oligoryzomys magellanicus LC
        - Small-eared pygmy rice rat, Oligoryzomys microtis LC
        - Moojen's pygmy rice rat, Oligoryzomys moojeni DD
        - Black-footed pygmy rice rat, Oligoryzomys nigripes LC
        - Rock pygmy rice rat, Oligoryzomys rupestris DD
        - Straw-colored pygmy rice rat, Oligoryzomys stramineus LC
      - Genus: Oreoryzomys
        - Peruvian rice rat, Oreoryzomys balneator DD
      - Genus: Oryzomys
        - Coues's rice rat, Oryzomys couesi LC
        - Gorgas's rice rat, Oryzomys gorgasi EN
      - Genus: Oxymycterus
        - Argentine hocicudo, Oxymycterus akodontius DD
        - Amazonian hocicudo, Oxymycterus amazonicus LC
        - Angular hocicudo, Oxymycterus angularis LC
        - Caparaó hocicudo, Oxymycterus caparoae LC
        - Atlantic Forest hocicudo, Oxymycterus dasytrichus LC
        - Spy hocicudo, Oxymycterus delator LC
        - Small hocicudo, Oxymycterus hiska LC
        - Hispid hocicudo, Oxymycterus hispidus LC
        - Quechuan hocicudo, Oxymycterus hucucha EN
        - Incan hocicudo, Oxymycterus inca LC
        - Cook's hocicudo, Oxymycterus josei EN
        - Long-nosed hocicudo, Oxymycterus nasutus LC
        - Paramo hocicudo, Oxymycterus paramensis LC
        - Quaestor hocicudo, Oxymycterus quaestor LC
        - Robert's hocicudo, Oxymycterus roberti LC
        - Red hocicudo, Oxymycterus rufus LC
        - Oxymycterus wayku
      - Genus: Paralomys
        - Gerbil leaf-eared mouse, Paralomys gerbillus LC
      - Genus: Pearsonomys
        - Pearson's long-clawed mouse, Pearsonomys annectens VU
      - Genus: Phaenomys
        - Rio de Janeiro arboreal rat, Phaenomys ferrugineus VU
      - Genus: Phyllotis
        - Phyllotis alisosiensis
        - Friendly leaf-eared mouse, Phyllotis amicus LC
        - Andean leaf-eared mouse, Phyllotis andium LC
        - Anita's leaf-eared mouse, Phyllotis anitae DD
        - Buenos Aires leaf-eared mouse, Phyllotis bonariensis NT
        - Capricorn leaf-eared mouse, Phyllotis caprinus LC
        - Darwin's leaf-eared mouse, Phyllotis darwini LC
        - Definitive leaf-eared mouse, Phyllotis definitus EN
        - Haggard's leaf-eared mouse, Phyllotis haggardi LC
        - Lima leaf-eared mouse, Phyllotis limatus LC
        - Master leaf-eared mouse, Phyllotis magister LC
        - Osgood's leaf-eared mouse, Phyllotis osgoodi DD
        - Bunchgrass leaf-eared mouse, Phyllotis osilae LC
        - Wolffsohn's leaf-eared mouse, Phyllotis wolffsohni LC
        - Yellow-rumped leaf-eared mouse, Phyllotis xanthopygus LC
      - Genus: Podoxymys
        - Roraima mouse, Podoxymys roraimae VU
      - Genus: Pseudoryzomys
        - Brazilian false rice rat, Pseudoryzomys simplex LC
      - Genus: Punomys
        - Eastern puna mouse, Punomys kofordi VU
        - Puna mouse, Punomys lemminus VU
      - Genus: Reithrodon
        - Bunny rat, Reithrodon auritus LC
        - Naked-soled conyrat, Reithrodon typicus LC
      - Genus: Rhagomys
        - Long-tongued arboreal mouse, Rhagomys longilingua LC
        - Brazilian arboreal mouse, Rhagomys rufescens NT
      - Genus: Rhipidomys
        - Southern climbing mouse, Rhipidomys austrinus LC
        - Cariri climbing mouse, Rhipidomys cariri DD
        - Cauca climbing mouse, Rhipidomys caucensis DD
        - Coues's climbing mouse, Rhipidomys couesi LC
        - Eastern Amazon climbing mouse, Rhipidomys emiliae LC
        - Buff-bellied climbing mouse, Rhipidomys fulviventer LC
        - Gardner's climbing mouse, Rhipidomys gardneri LC
        - Broad-footed climbing mouse, Rhipidomys latimanus LC
        - White-footed climbing mouse, Rhipidomys leucodactylus LC
        - MacConnell's climbing mouse, Rhipidomys macconnelli LC
        - Cerrado climbing mouse, Rhipidomys macrurus LC
        - Atlantic Forest climbing mouse, Rhipidomys mastacalis LC
        - Peruvian climbing mouse, Rhipidomys modicus LC
        - Splendid climbing mouse, Rhipidomys nitela LC
        - Yellow-bellied climbing mouse, Rhipidomys ochrogaster DD
        - Venezuelan climbing mouse, Rhipidomys venezuelae LC
        - Charming climbing mouse, Rhipidomys venustus LC
        - Wetzel's climbing mouse, Rhipidomys wetzeli LC
      - Genus: Salinomys
        - Delicate salt flat mouse, Salinomys delicatus DD
      - Genus: Scapteromys
        - Argentine swamp rat, Scapteromys aquaticus LC
        - Plateau swamp rat, Scapteromys meridionalis
        - Waterhouse's swamp rat, Scapteromys tumidus LC
      - Genus: Scolomys
        - South American spiny mouse, Scolomys melanops LC
        - Ucayali spiny mouse, Scolomys ucayalensis LC
      - Genus: Sigmodon
        - Alston's cotton rat, Sigmodon alstoni LC
        - Southern cotton rat, Sigmodon hirsutus LC
        - Unexpected cotton rat, Sigmodon inopinatus VU
        - Peruvian cotton rat, Sigmodon peruanus LC
      - Genus: Sigmodontomys
        - Alfaro's rice water rat, Sigmodontomys alfari LC
        - Harris's rice water rat, Sigmodontomys aphrastus DD
      - Genus: Sooretamys
        - Paraguayan rice rat, Sooretamys angouya LC
      - Genus: Tapecomys
        - Tapecomys wolffsohni
        - Primordial tapecua, Tapecomys primus LC
      - Genus: Thalpomys
        - Cerrado mouse, Thalpomys cerradensis LC
        - Hairy-eared cerrado mouse, Thalpomys lasiotis LC
      - Genus: Thaptomys
        - Blackish grass mouse, Thaptomys nigrita LC
      - Genus: Thomasomys
        - Anderson's Oldfield mouse, Thomasomys andersoni
        - Apeco Oldfield mouse, Thomasomys apeco VU
        - Golden Oldfield mouse, Thomasomys aureus LC
        - Beady-eyed mouse, Thomasomys baeops LC
        - Silky Oldfield mouse, Thomasomys bombycinus DD
        - White-tipped Oldfield mouse, Thomasomys caudivarius LC
        - Ashy-bellied Oldfield mouse, Thomasomys cinereiventer LC
        - Ash-colored Oldfield mouse, Thomasomys cinereus LC
        - Cinnamon-colored Oldfield mouse, Thomasomys cinnameus LC
        - Daphne's Oldfield mouse, Thomasomys daphne LC
        - Peruvian Oldfield mouse, Thomasomys eleusis LC
        - Wandering Oldfield mouse, Thomasomys erro LC
        - Slender Oldfield mouse, Thomasomys gracilis NT
        - Hudson's Oldfield mouse, Thomasomys hudsoni DD
        - Woodland Oldfield mouse, Thomasomys hylophilus EN
        - Inca Oldfield mouse, Thomasomys incanus VU
        - Strong-tailed Oldfield mouse, Thomasomys ischyurus VU
        - Kalinowski's Oldfield mouse, Thomasomys kalinowskii VU
        - Ladew's Oldfield mouse, Thomasomys ladewi LC
        - Soft-furred Oldfield mouse, Thomasomys laniger LC
        - Large-eared Oldfield mouse, Thomasomys macrotis VU
        - Unicolored Oldfield mouse, Thomasomys monochromos EN
        - Snow-footed Oldfield mouse, Thomasomys niveipes LC
        - Distinguished Oldfield mouse, Thomasomys notatus LC
        - Ashaninka Oldfield mouse, Thomasomys onkiro VU
        - Montane Oldfield mouse, Thomasomys oreas LC
        - Paramo Oldfield mouse, Thomasomys paramorum LC
        - Popayán Oldfield mouse, Thomasomys popayanus DD
        - Cajamarca Oldfield mouse, Thomasomys praetor DD
        - Thomas's Oldfield mouse, Thomasomys pyrrhonotus VU
        - Rhoads's Oldfield mouse, Thomasomys rhoadsi LC
        - Rosalinda's Oldfield mouse, Thomasomys rosalinda DD
        - Forest Oldfield mouse, Thomasomys silvestris LC
        - Taczanowski's Oldfield mouse, Thomasomys taczanowskii LC
        - Ucucha Oldfield mouse, Thomasomys ucucha VU
        - Dressy Oldfield mouse, Thomasomys vestitus LC
        - Pichincha Oldfield mouse, Thomasomys vulcani DD
      - Genus: Transandinomys
        - Bolivar rice rat, Transandinomys bolivaris LC
        - Talamancan rice rat, Transandinomys talamancae LC
      - Genus: Wiedomys
        - Cerrado red-nosed mouse, Wiedomys cerradensis DD
        - Red-nosed mouse, Wiedomys pyrrhorhinos LC
      - Genus: Wilfredomys
        - Greater Wilfred's mouse, Wilfredomys oenax EN
      - Genus: Zygodontomys
        - Short-tailed cane mouse, Zygodontomys brevicauda LC
        - Brown cane mouse, Zygodontomys brunneus LC

===== Order: Lagomorpha (lagomorphs) =====
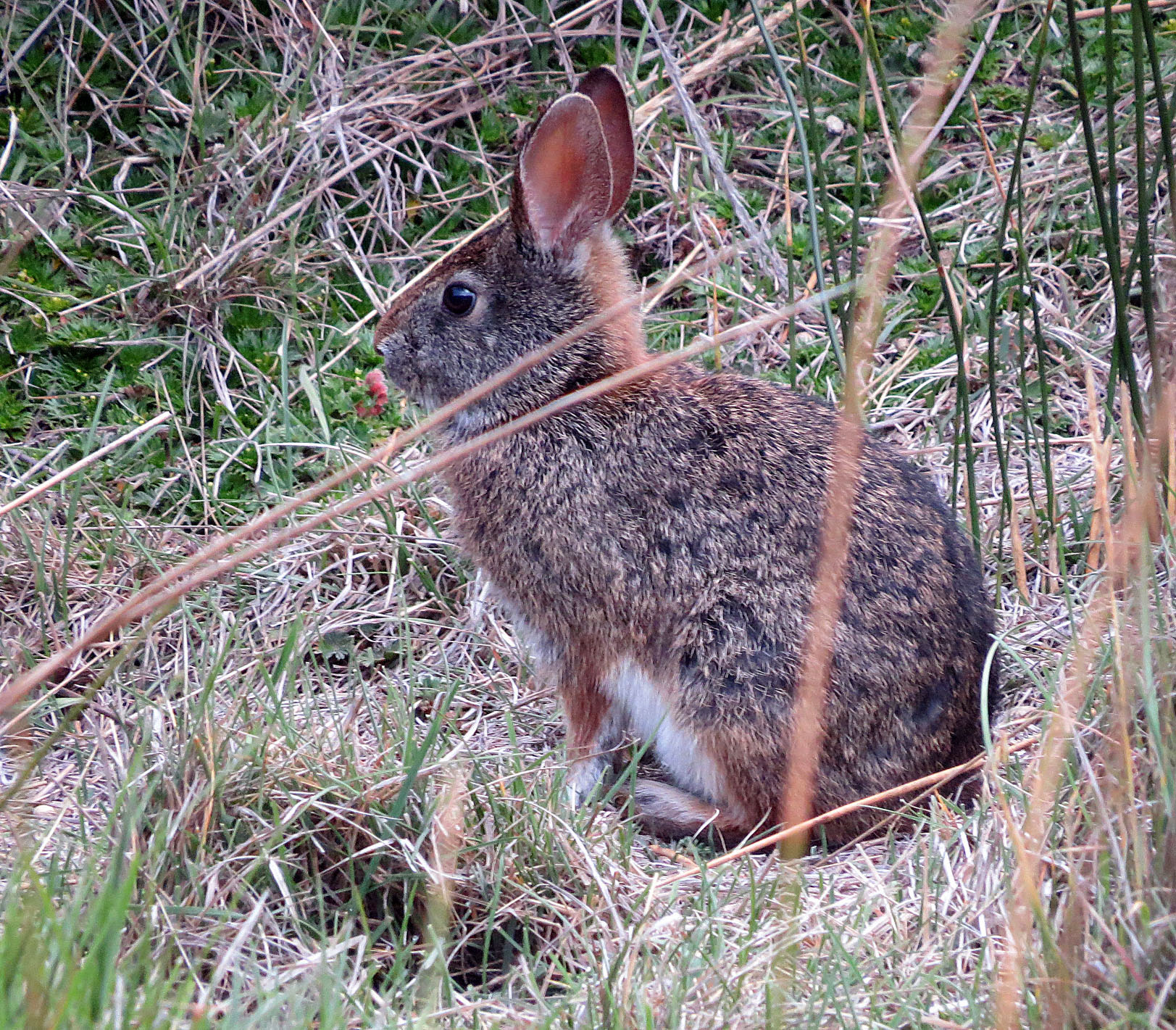
Andean cottontail

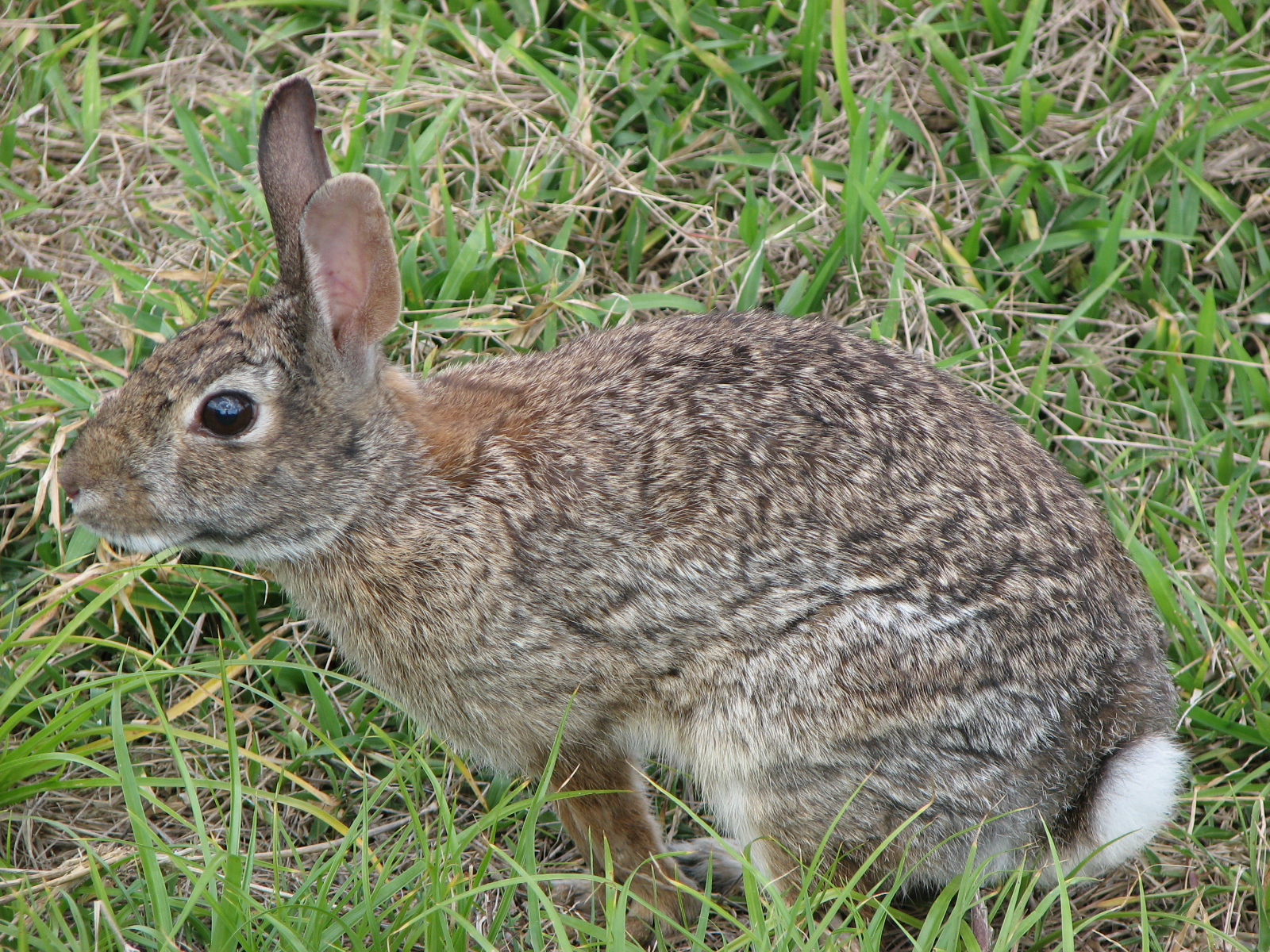
Eastern cottontail

The lagomorphs comprise two families, Leporidae (hares and rabbits), and Ochotonidae (pikas). Though they can resemble rodents, and were classified as a superfamily in that order until the early 20th century, they have since been considered a separate order. They differ from rodents in a number of physical characteristics, such as having four incisors in the upper jaw rather than two. South America's meager lagomorph diversity (6 species compared to 18 for North America north of Mexico) reflects their recent arrival and failure (so far) to diversify much. Only the tapeti is present south of northern South America; lagomorphs are absent from most of South America's southern cone.

- Family: Leporidae (rabbits, hares)
  - Genus: Sylvilagus
    - Andean cottontail, Sylvilagus andinus NE
    - Tapeti, Sylvilagus brasiliensis LC
    - Eastern cottontail, Sylvilagus floridanus LC
    - Suriname lowland forest cottontail, Sylvilagus parentum NE
    - Rio de Janeiro dwarf rabbit, Sylvilagus tapetillus NE
    - Venezuelan lowland rabbit, Sylvilagus varynaensis DD

==== Superorder: Laurasiatheria ====
===== Order: Eulipotyphla (shrews, hedgehogs, moles, and solenodons) =====
Eulipotyphlans are insectivorous mammals. Shrews and solenodons closely resemble mice, hedgehogs carry spines, while moles are stout-bodied burrowers. In South America, shrews are only found in the north (Colombia, Venezuela, Ecuador and Peru), a legacy of their relatively recent immigration to the continent by way of Central America (where shrew species are considerably more diverse). Moles are not found in the Americas south of northern Mexico.

- Family: Soricidae (shrews)
  - Subfamily: Soricinae
    - Tribe: Blarinini
      - Genus: Cryptotis
        - C. nigrescens group
          - Eastern Cordillera small-footed shrew, Cryptotis brachyonyx DD
          - Colombian small-eared shrew, Cryptotis colombiana LC
          - Darién small-eared shrew, Cryptotis mera EN
        - C. thomasi group
          - Ecuadoran small-eared shrew, Cryptotis equatoris LC
          - Medellín small-eared shrew, Cryptotis medellinia LC
          - Merida small-eared shrew, Cryptotis meridensis LC
          - Wandering small-eared shrew, Cryptotis montivaga LC
          - Peruvian small-eared shrew, Cryptotis peruviensis DD
          - Scaly-footed small-eared shrew, Cryptotis squamipes LC
          - Tamá small-eared shrew, Cryptotis tamensis LC
          - Thomas' small-eared shrew, Cryptotis thomasi LC

===== Order: Chiroptera (bats) =====
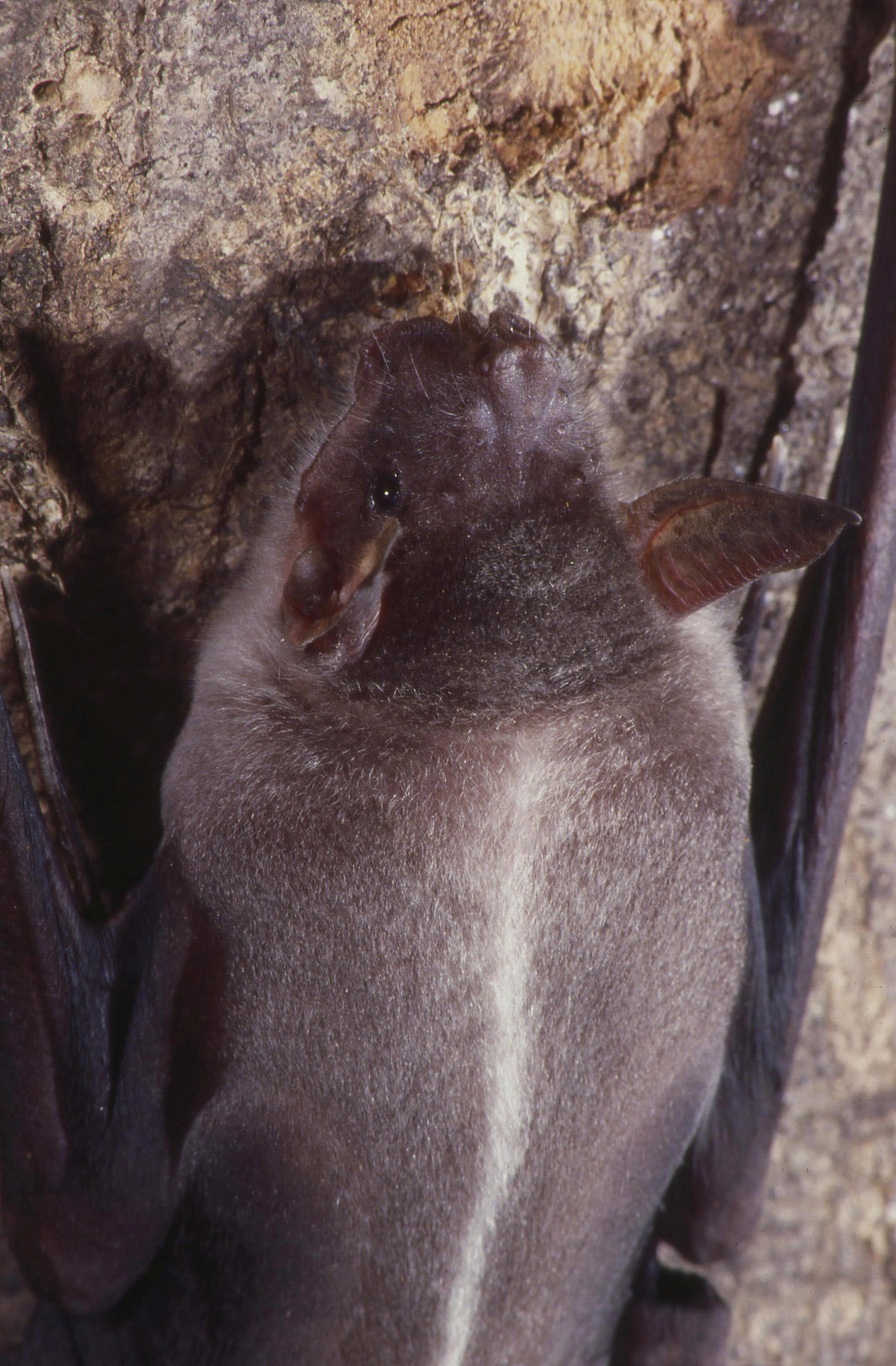
Greater bulldog bat

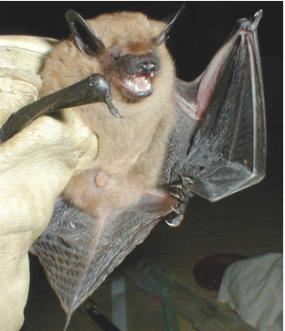
Big brown bat

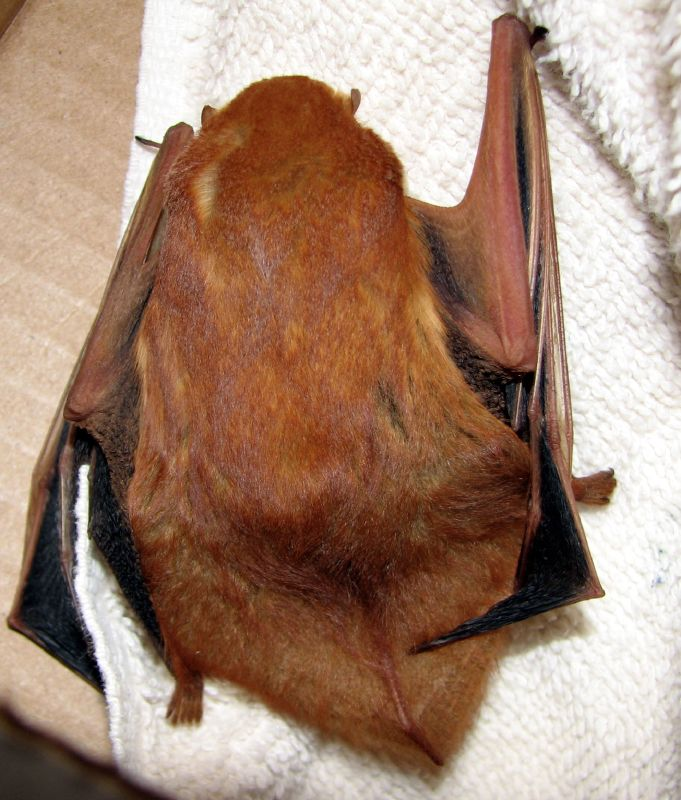
Desert red bat

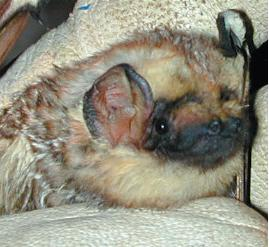
Hoary bat

The bats' most distinguishing feature is that their forelimbs are developed as wings, making them the only mammals capable of flight. Bat species account for about 20% of all mammals.

- Family: Noctilionidae (bulldog bats)
  - Genus: Noctilio
    - Lesser bulldog bat, Noctilio albiventris LC
    - Greater bulldog bat, Noctilio leporinus LC
- Family: Vespertilionidae
  - Subfamily: Myotinae
    - Genus: Myotis
      - Southern myotis, Myotis aelleni DD
      - Silver-tipped myotis, Myotis albescens LC
      - Atacama myotis, Myotis atacamensis NT
      - Chilean myotis, Myotis chiloensis LC
      - Myotis dinellii LC
      - Hairy-legged myotis, Myotis keaysi LC
      - Yellowish myotis, Myotis levis LC
      - Myotis midastactus NE
      - Curacao myotis, Myotis nesopolus LC
      - Black myotis, Myotis nigricans LC
      - Montane myotis, Myotis oxyotus LC
      - Riparian myotis, Myotis riparius LC
      - Red myotis, Myotis ruber NT
      - Velvety myotis, Myotis simus DD
  - Subfamily: Vespertilioninae
    - Genus: Eptesicus
      - Little black serotine, Eptesicus andinus LC
      - Brazilian brown bat, Eptesicus brasiliensis LC
      - Chiriquinan serotine, Eptesicus chiriquinus LC
      - Diminutive serotine, Eptesicus diminutus DD
      - Argentine brown bat, Eptesicus furinalis LC
      - Big brown bat, Eptesicus fuscus LC
      - Harmless serotine, Eptesicus innoxius NT
      - Eptesicus taddeii
    - Genus: Histiotus
      - Strange big-eared brown bat, Histiotus alienus DD
      - Humboldt big-eared brown bat, Histiotus humboldti DD
      - Thomas's big-eared brown bat, Histiotus laephotis NT
      - Big-eared brown bat, Histiotus macrotus LC
      - Southern big-eared brown bat, Histiotus magellanicus LC
      - Small big-eared brown bat, Histiotus montanus LC
      - Tropical big-eared brown bat, Histiotus velatus DD
    - Genus: Lasiurus
      - Lasiurus atratus LC
      - Desert red bat, Lasiurus blossevillii LC
      - Tacarcuna bat, Lasiurus castaneus DD
      - Hoary bat, Lasiurus cinereus LC
      - Hairy-tailed bat, Lasiurus ebenus DD
      - Southern yellow bat, Lasiurus ega LC
      - Big red bat, Lasiurus egregius DD
      - Pfeiffer's red bat, Lasiurus pfeifferi
      - Saline red bat, Lasiurus salinae
      - Cinnamon red bat, Lasiurus varius LC
    - Genus: Rhogeessa
      - Husson's yellow bat, Rhogeessa hussoni DD
      - Thomas's yellow bat, Rhogeessa io LC
      - Tiny yellow bat, Rhogeessa minutilla VU
  - Subfamily: Tomopeatinae
    - Genus: Tomopeas
      - Blunt-eared bat, Tomopeas ravus VU

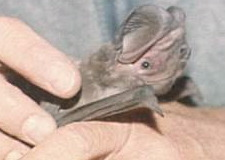
Western mastiff bat

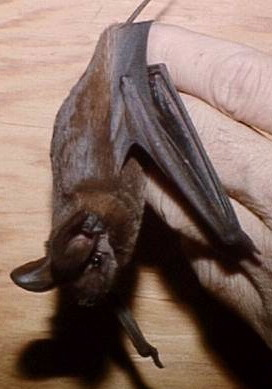
Big free-tailed bat

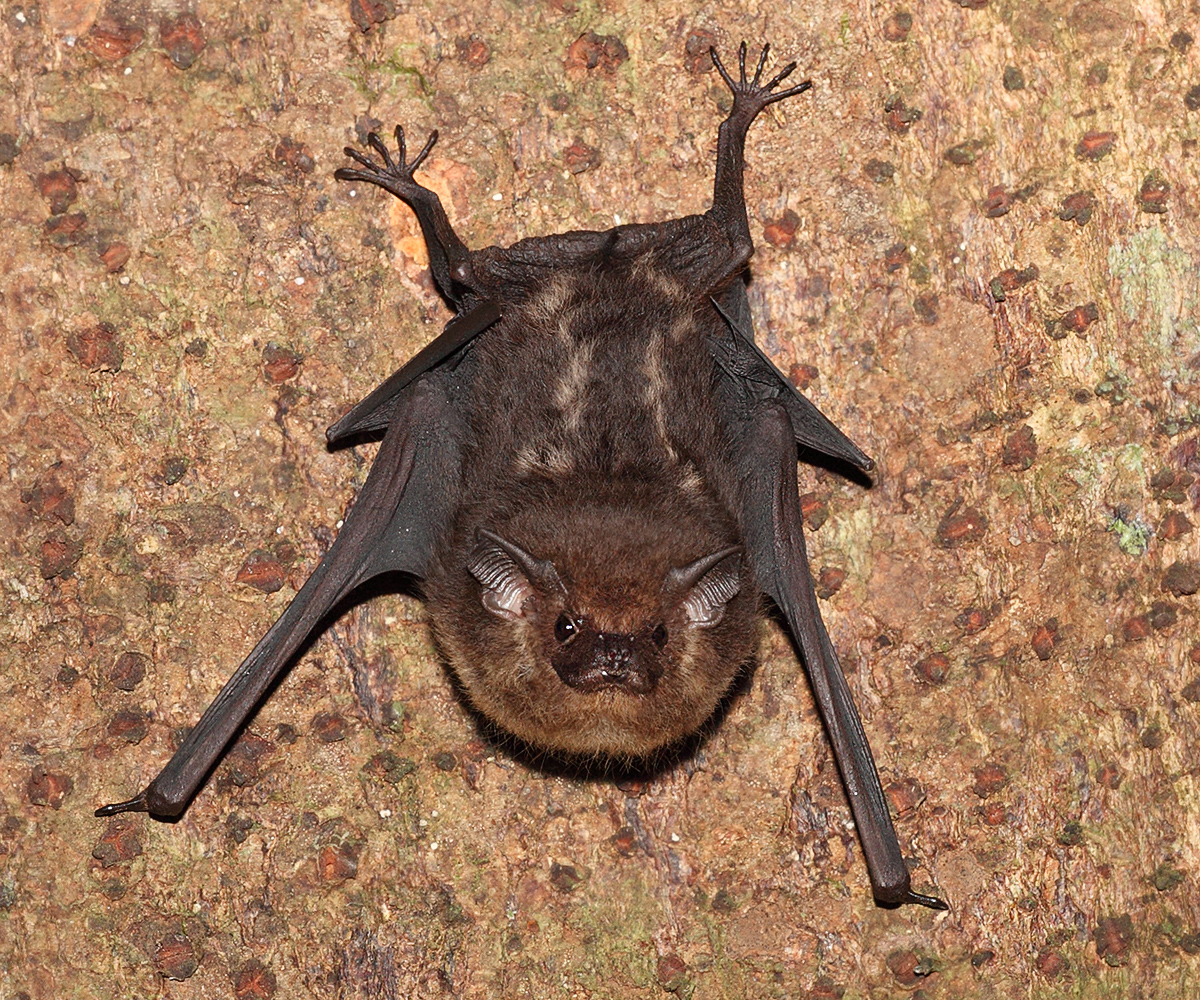
Greater or lesser sac-winged bat

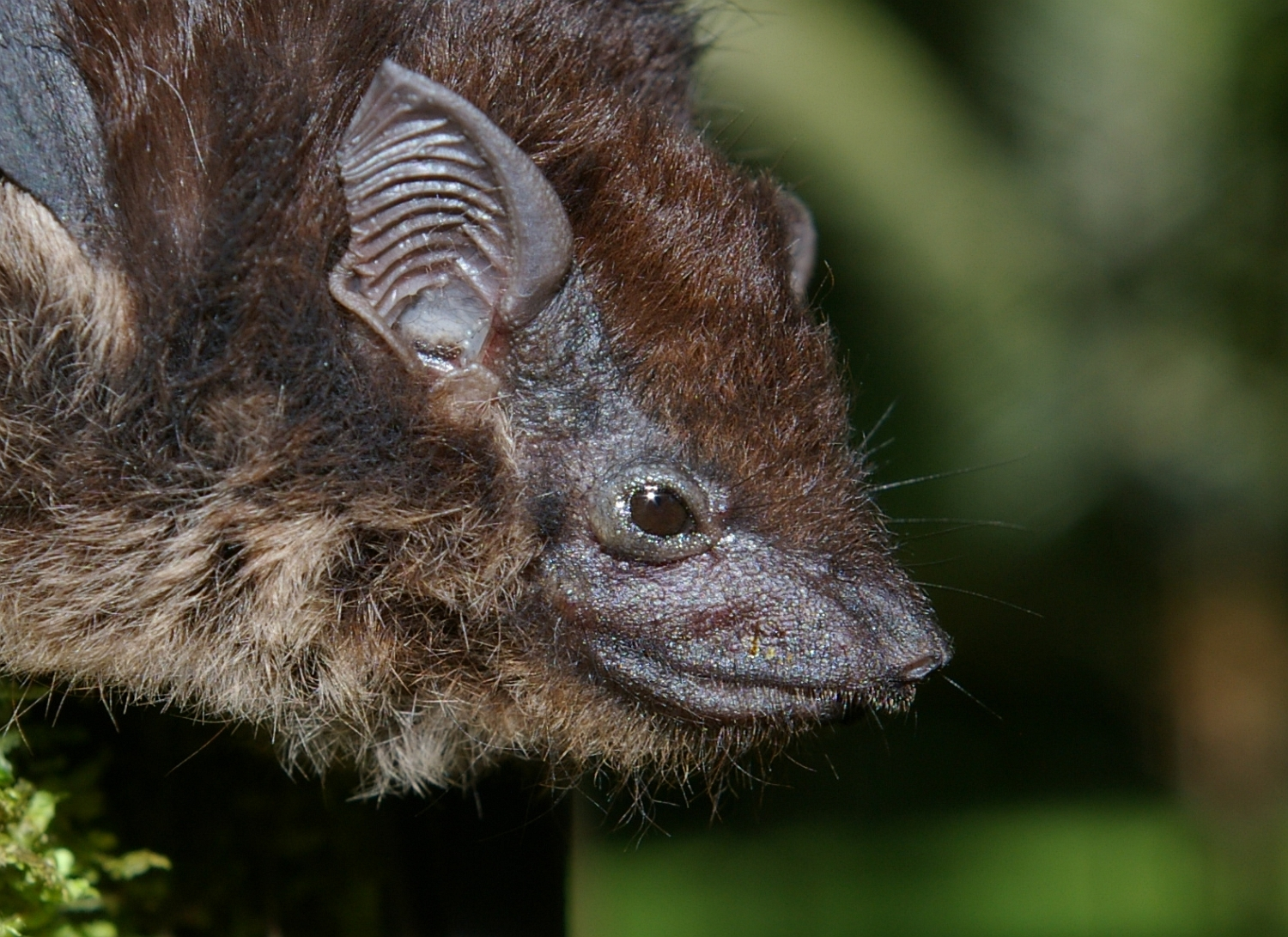
Greater sac-winged bat

- Family: Molossidae (free-tailed bats)
  - Genus: Cynomops
    - Cinnamon dog-faced bat, Cynomops abrasus DD
    - Greenhall's dog-faced bat, Cynomops greenhalli LC
    - Para dog-faced bat, Cynomops paranus DD
    - Southern dog-faced bat, Cynomops planirostris LC
  - Genus: Eumops
    - Black bonneted bat, Eumops auripendulus LC
    - Dwarf bonneted bat, Eumops bonariensis LC
    - Big bonneted bat, Eumops dabbenei LC
    - Wagner's bonneted bat, Eumops glaucinus LC
    - Sanborn's bonneted bat, Eumops hansae LC
    - Guianan bonneted bat, Eumops maurus DD
    - Patagonian bonneted bat, Eumops patagonicus LC
    - Western mastiff bat, Eumops perotis LC
    - Colombian bonneted bat, Eumops trumbulli LC
    - Wilson's bonneted bat, Eumops wilsoni
  - Genus: Molossops
    - Equatorial dog-faced bat, Molossops aequatorianus VU
    - Mato Grosso dog-faced bat, Molossops mattogrossensis LC
    - Rufous dog-faced bat, Molossops neglectus DD
    - Dwarf dog-faced bat, Molossops temminckii LC
  - Genus: Molossus
    - Barnes's mastiff bat, Molossus barnesi DD
    - Coiban mastiff bat, Molossus coibensis LC
    - Bonda mastiff bat, Molossus currentium LC
    - Velvety free-tailed bat, Molossus molossus LC
    - Miller's mastiff bat, Molossus pretiosus LC
    - Black mastiff bat, Molossus rufus LC
    - Sinaloan mastiff bat, Molossus sinaloae LC
    - Molossus trinitatis
  - Genus: Mormopterus
    - Kalinowski's mastiff bat, Mormopterus kalinowskii LC
    - Incan little mastiff bat, Mormopterus phrudus VU
  - Genus: Nyctinomops
    - Peale's free-tailed bat, Nyctinomops aurispinosus LC
    - Broad-eared bat, Nyctinomops laticaudatus LC
    - Big free-tailed bat, Nyctinomops macrotis LC
  - Genus: Promops
    - Big crested mastiff bat, Promops centralis LC
    - Brown mastiff bat, Promops nasutus LC
  - Genus: Tadarida
    - Mexican free-tailed bat, Tadarida brasiliensis LC
- Family: Emballonuridae (ghost bats, sac-winged bats and allies)
  - Genus: Balantiopteryx
    - Ecuadorian sac-winged bat, Balantiopteryx infusca EN
    - Gray sac-winged bat, Balantiopteryx plicata LC
  - Genus: Centronycteris
    - Thomas's shaggy bat, Centronycteris centralis LC
    - Shaggy bat, Centronycteris maximiliani LC
  - Genus: Cormura
    - Chestnut sac-winged bat, Cormura brevirostris LC
  - Genus: Cyttarops
    - Short-eared bat, Cyttarops alecto LC
  - Genus: Diclidurus
    - Northern ghost bat, Diclidurus albus LC
    - Greater ghost bat, Diclidurus ingens DD
    - Isabelle's ghost bat, Diclidurus isabella LC
    - Lesser ghost bat, Diclidurus scutatus LC
  - Genus: Peropteryx
    - Greater dog-like bat, Peropteryx kappleri LC
    - White-winged dog-like bat, Peropteryx leucoptera LC
    - Lesser doglike bat, Peropteryx macrotis LC
    - Trinidad dog-like bat, Peropteryx trinitatis DD
    - Pale-winged dog-like bat, Peropteryx pallidoptera
  - Genus: Rhynchonycteris
    - Proboscis bat, Rhynchonycteris naso LC
  - Genus: Saccopteryx
    - Antioquian sac-winged bat, Saccopteryx antioquensis DD
    - Greater sac-winged bat, Saccopteryx bilineata LC
    - Frosted sac-winged bat, Saccopteryx canescens LC
    - Amazonian sac-winged bat, Saccopteryx gymnura DD
    - Lesser sac-winged bat, Saccopteryx leptura LC

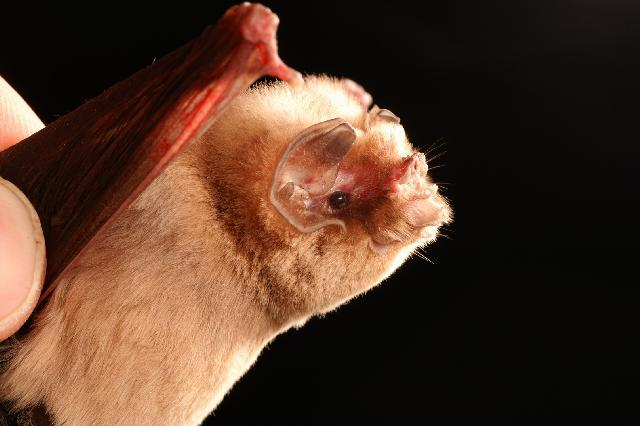
Ghost-faced bat

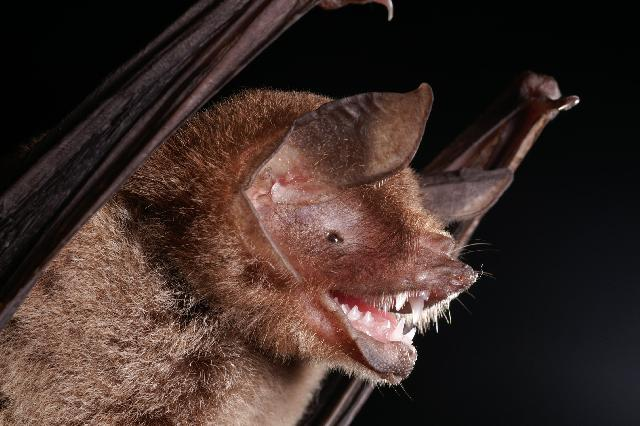
Parnell's mustached bat

- Family: Mormoopidae (mustached bats)
  - Genus: Mormoops
    - Ghost-faced bat, Mormoops megalophylla LC
  - Genus: Pteronotus
    - Davy's naked-backed bat, Pteronotus davyi LC
    - Big naked-backed bat, Pteronotus gymnonotus LC
    - Paraguana moustached bat, Pteronotus paraguanensis EN
    - Parnell's mustached bat, Pteronotus parnellii LC
    - Wagner's mustached bat, Pteronotus personatus LC

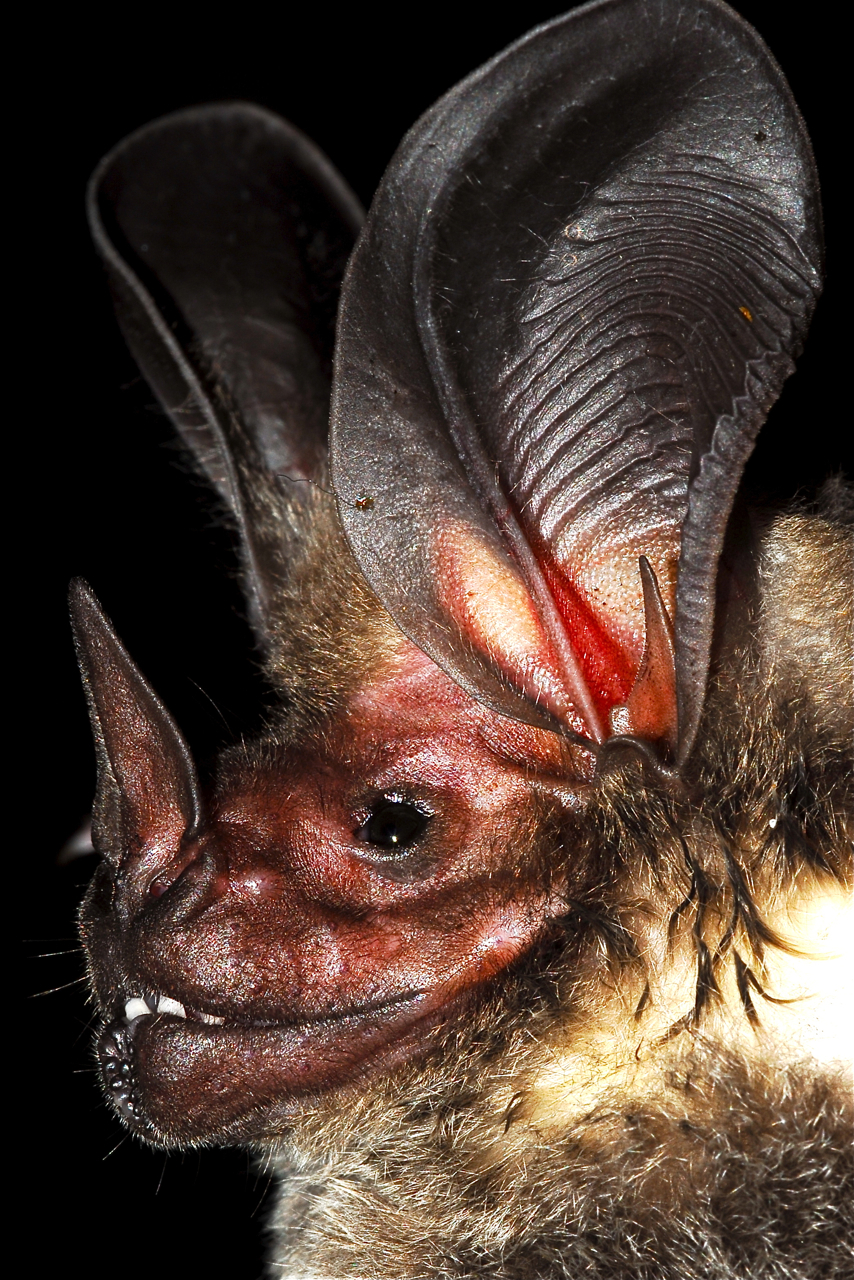
White-throated round-eared bat

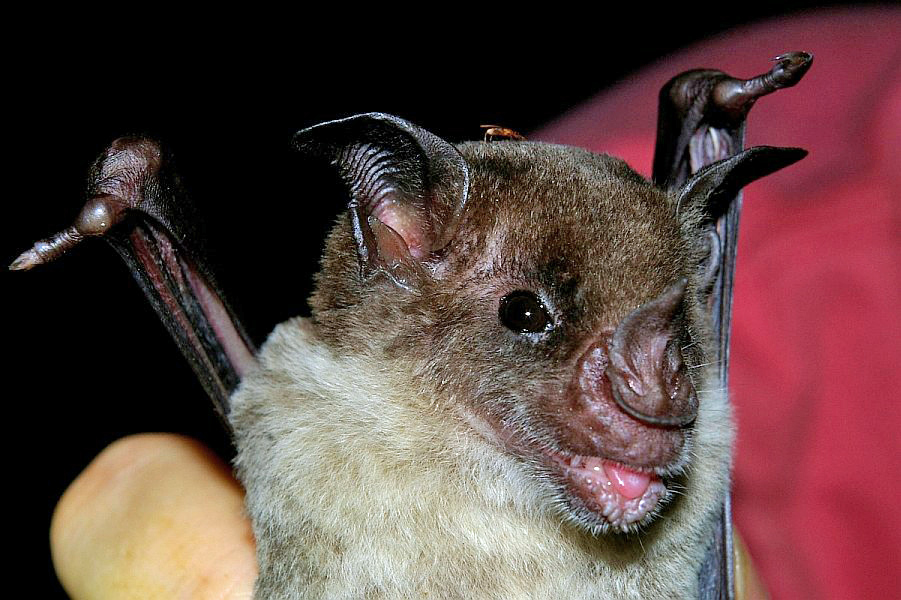
Pale spear-nosed bat

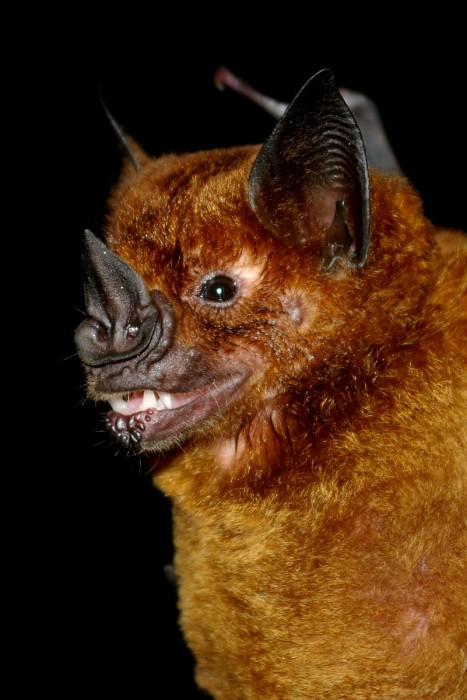
Greater spear-nosed bat

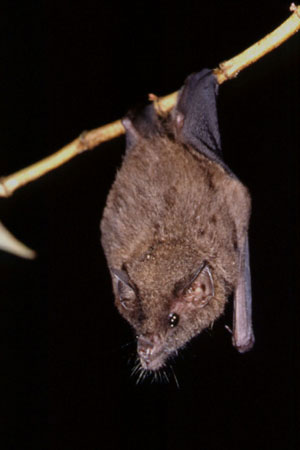
Geoffroy's tailless bat

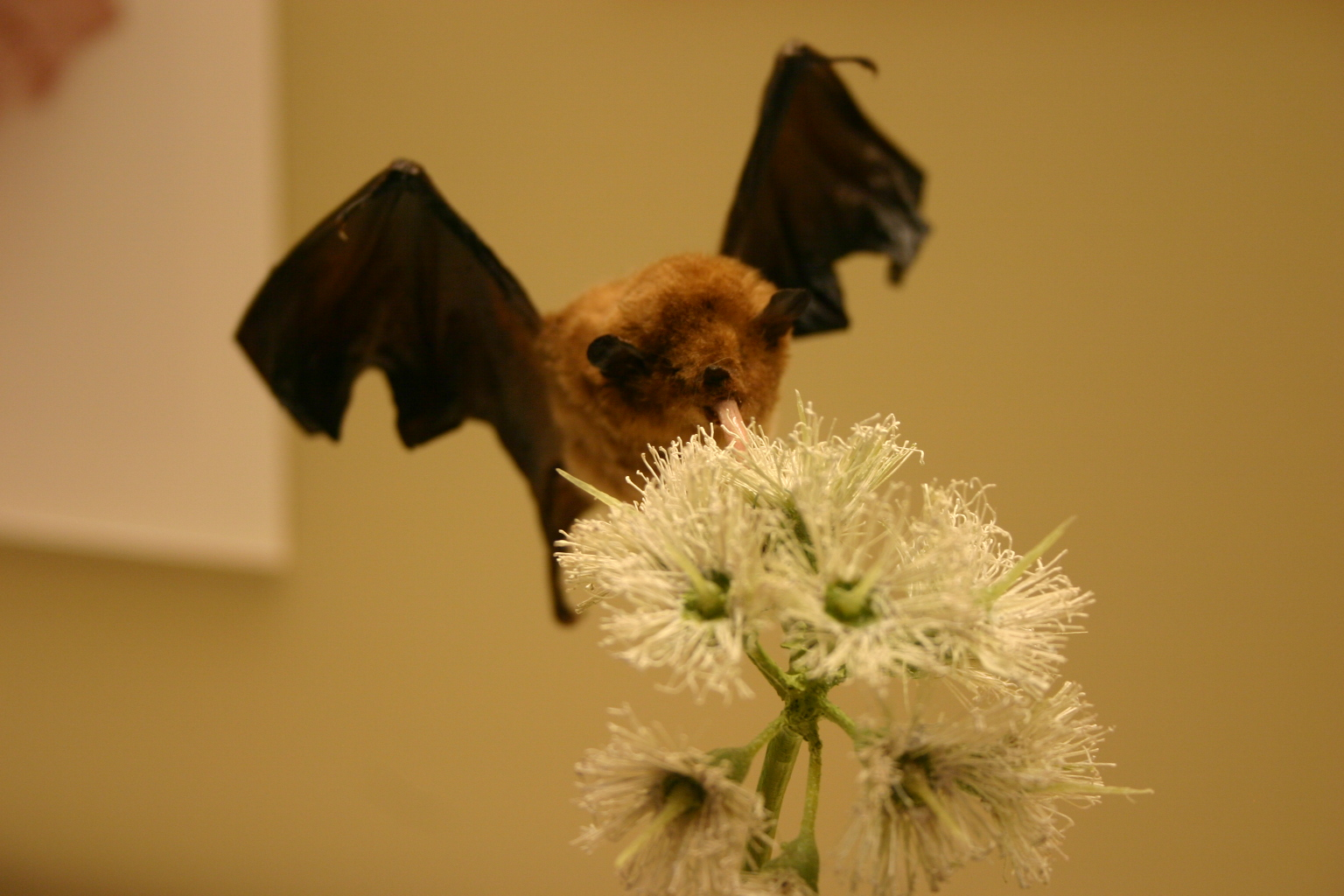
Pallas's long-tongued bat

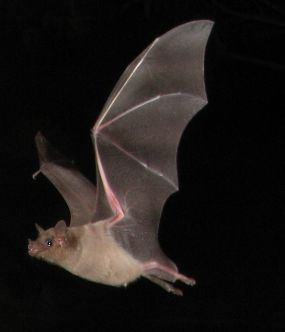
Southern long-nosed bat

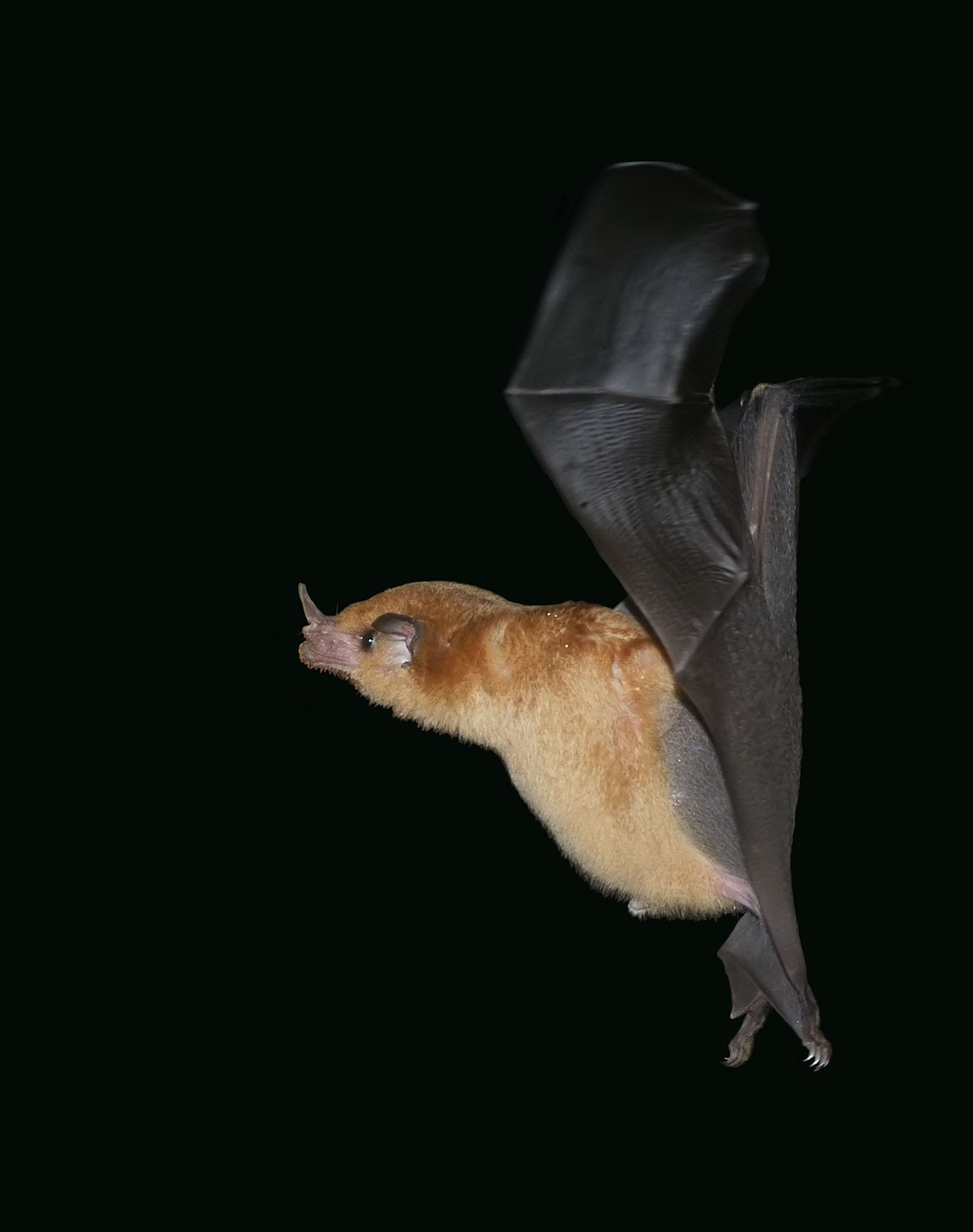
Orange nectar bat

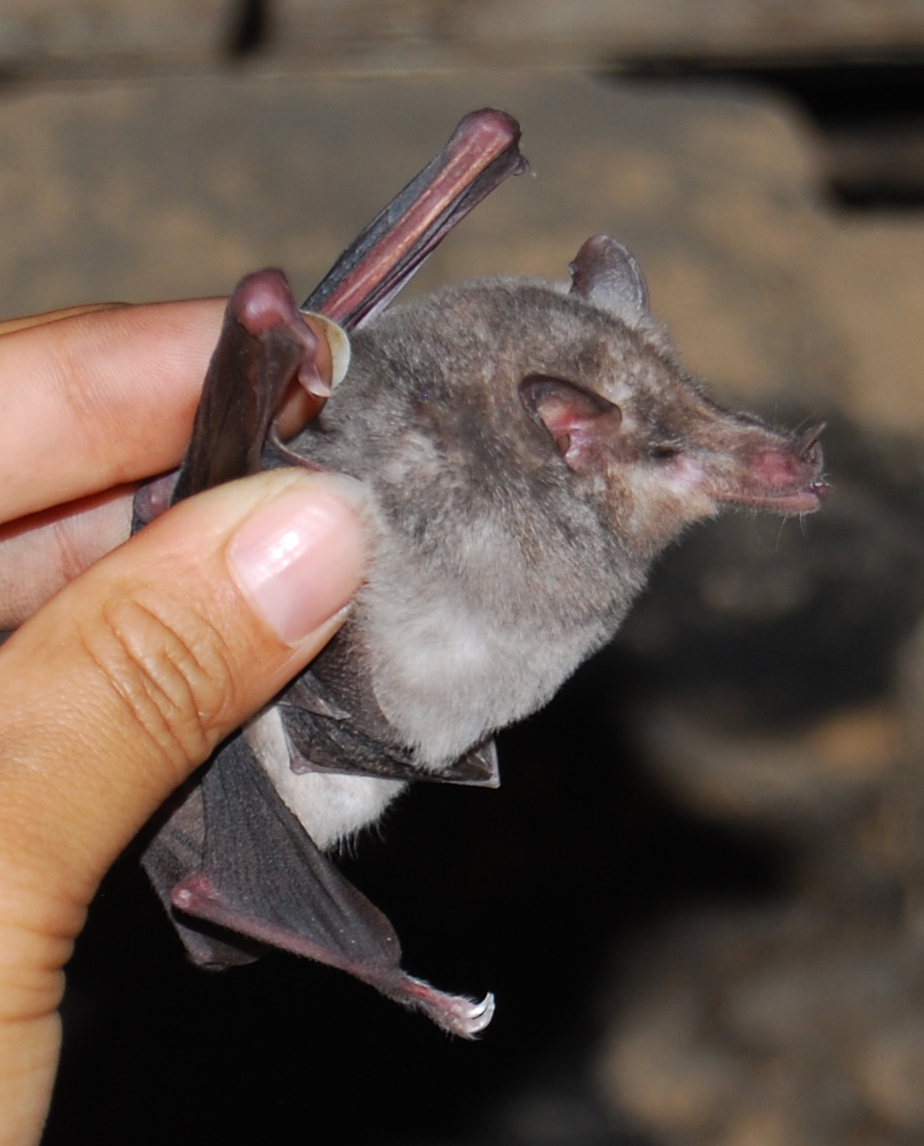
Long-snouted bat

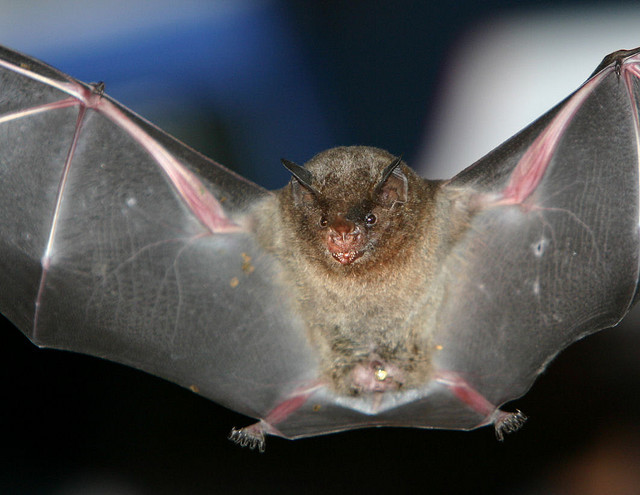
Silky short-tailed bat

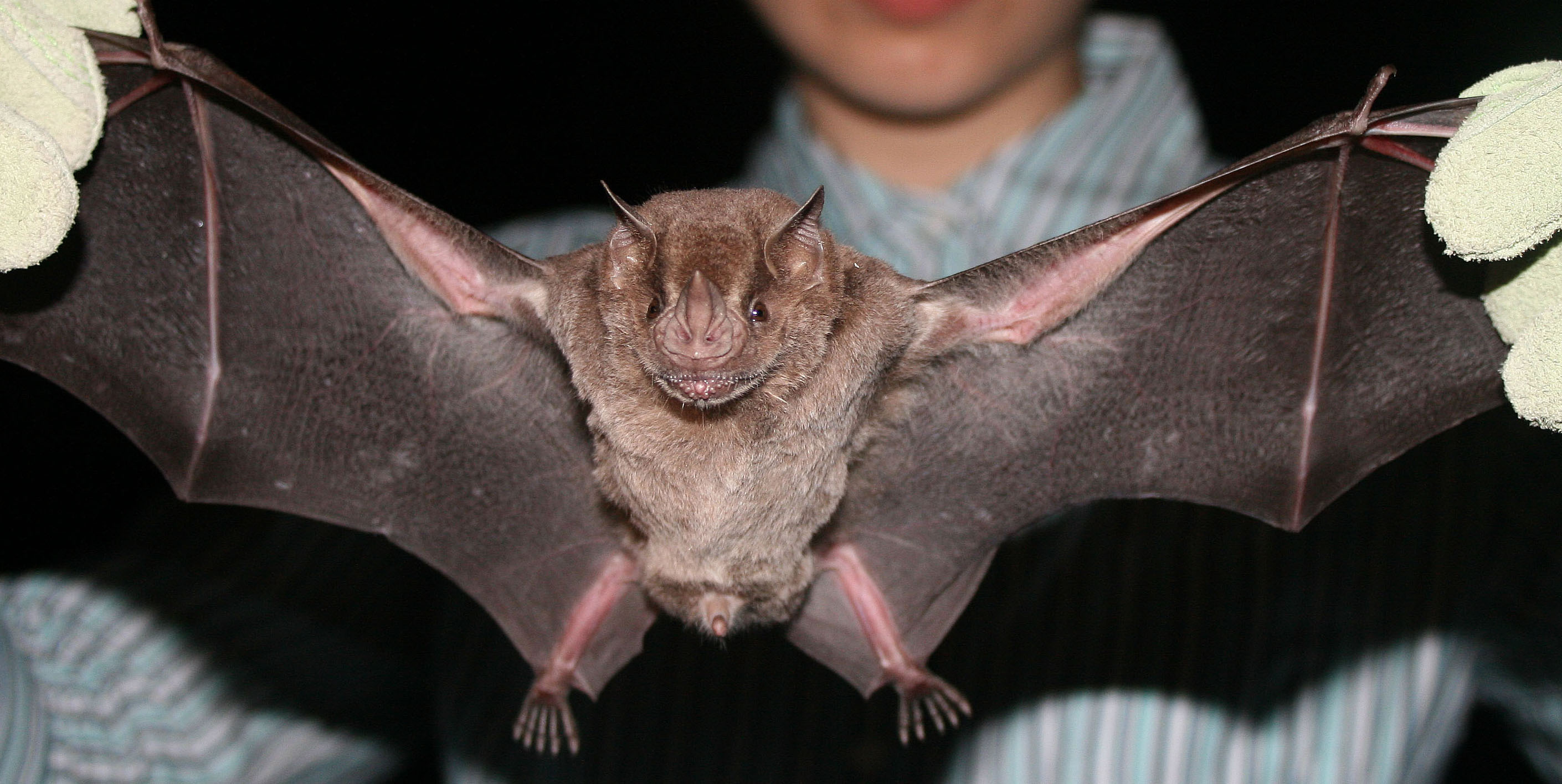
Jamaican fruit bat

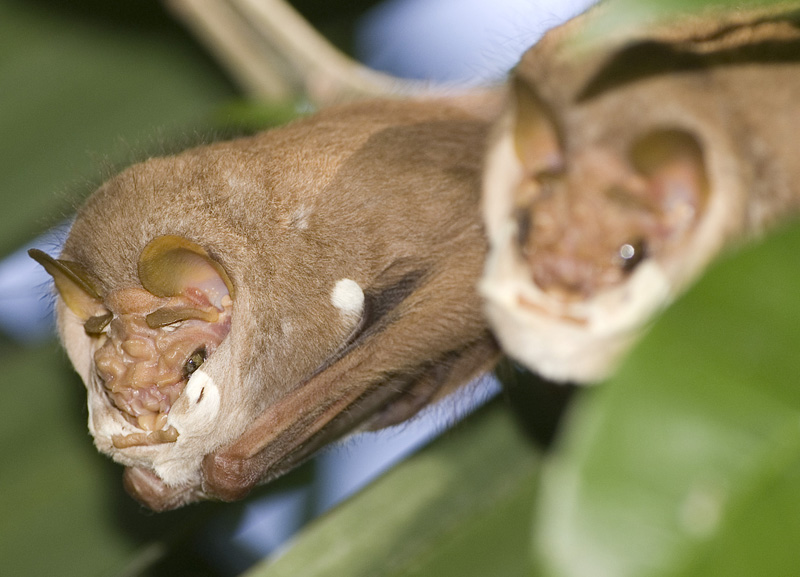
Wrinkle-faced bats

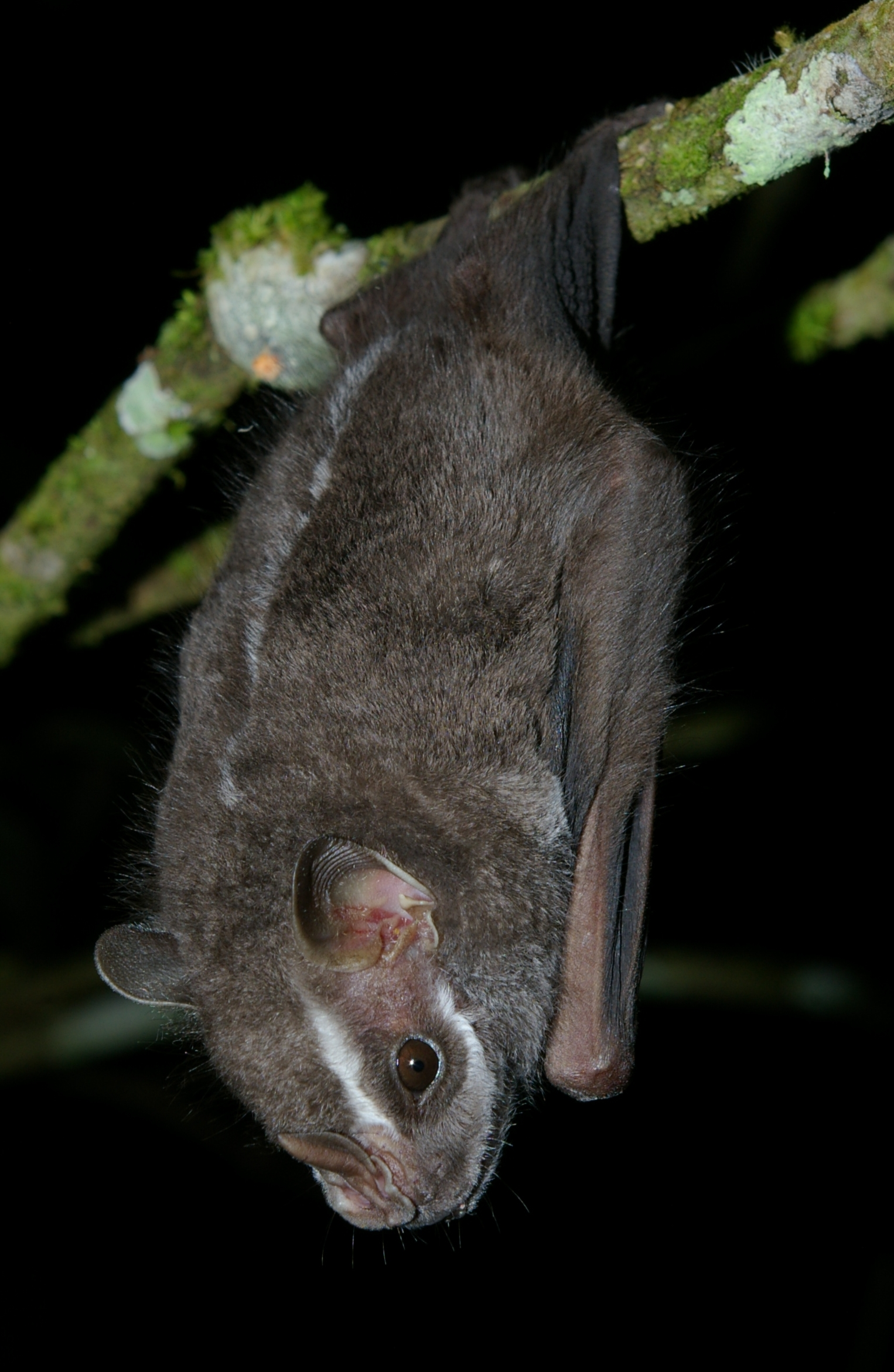
Salvin's big-eyed bat

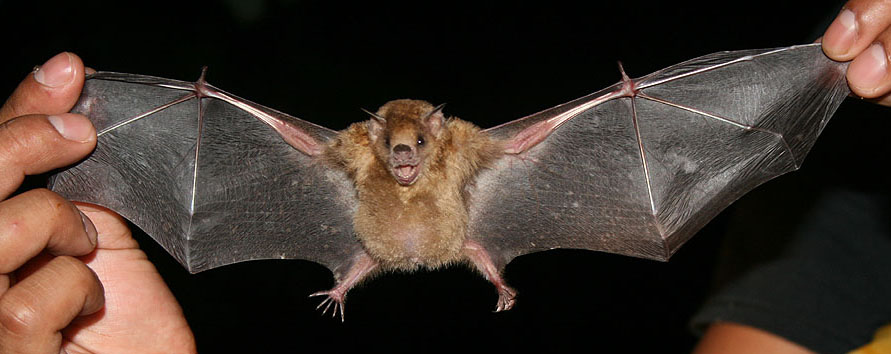
Little yellow-shouldered bat

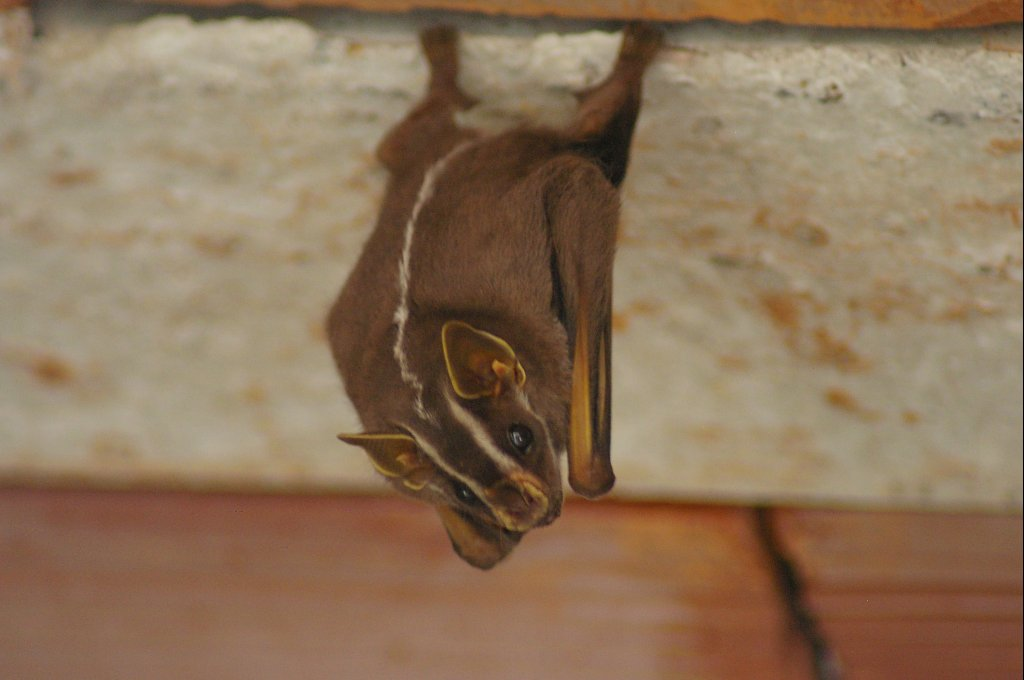
Platyrrhinus species

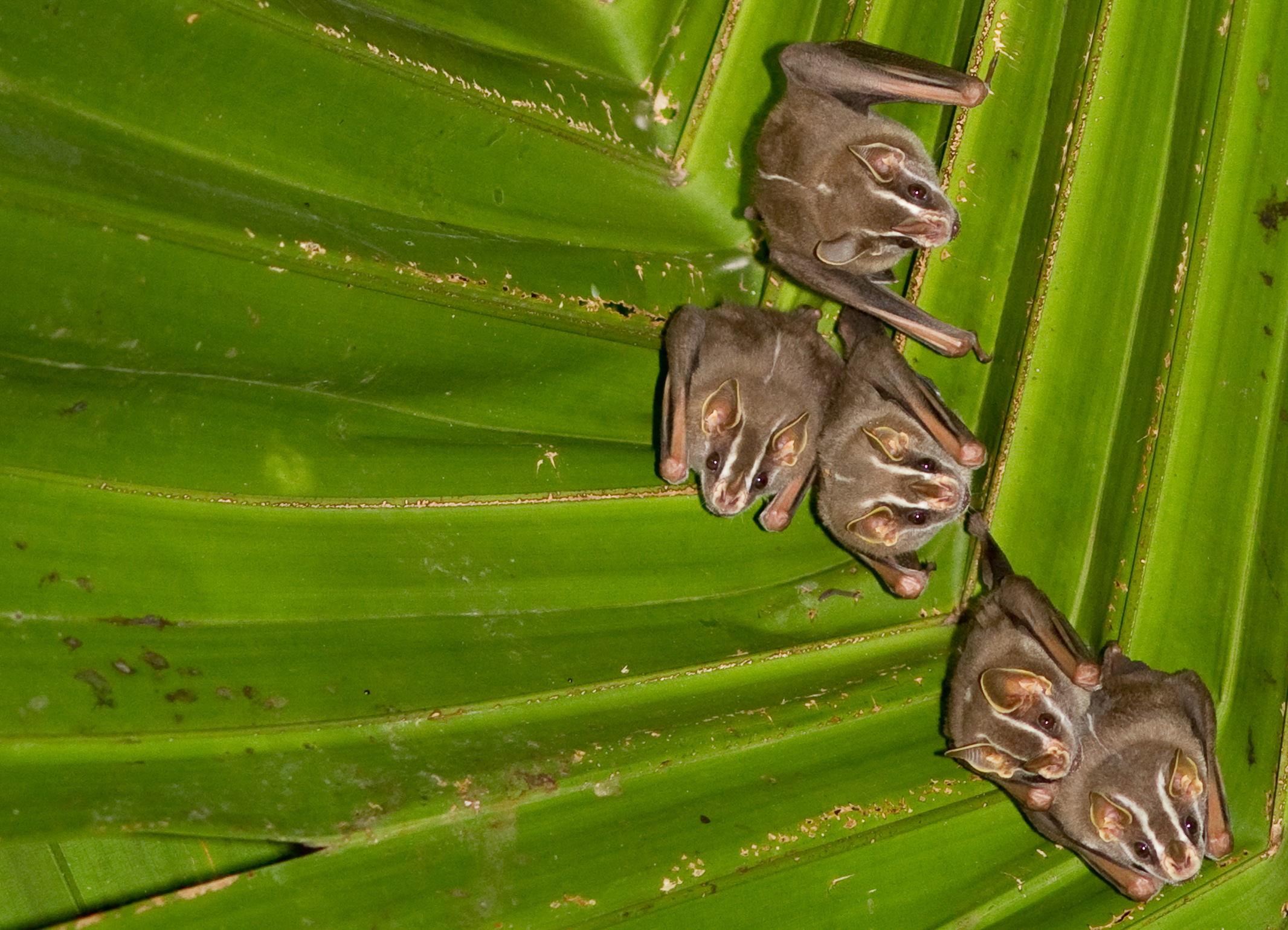
Tent-making bats

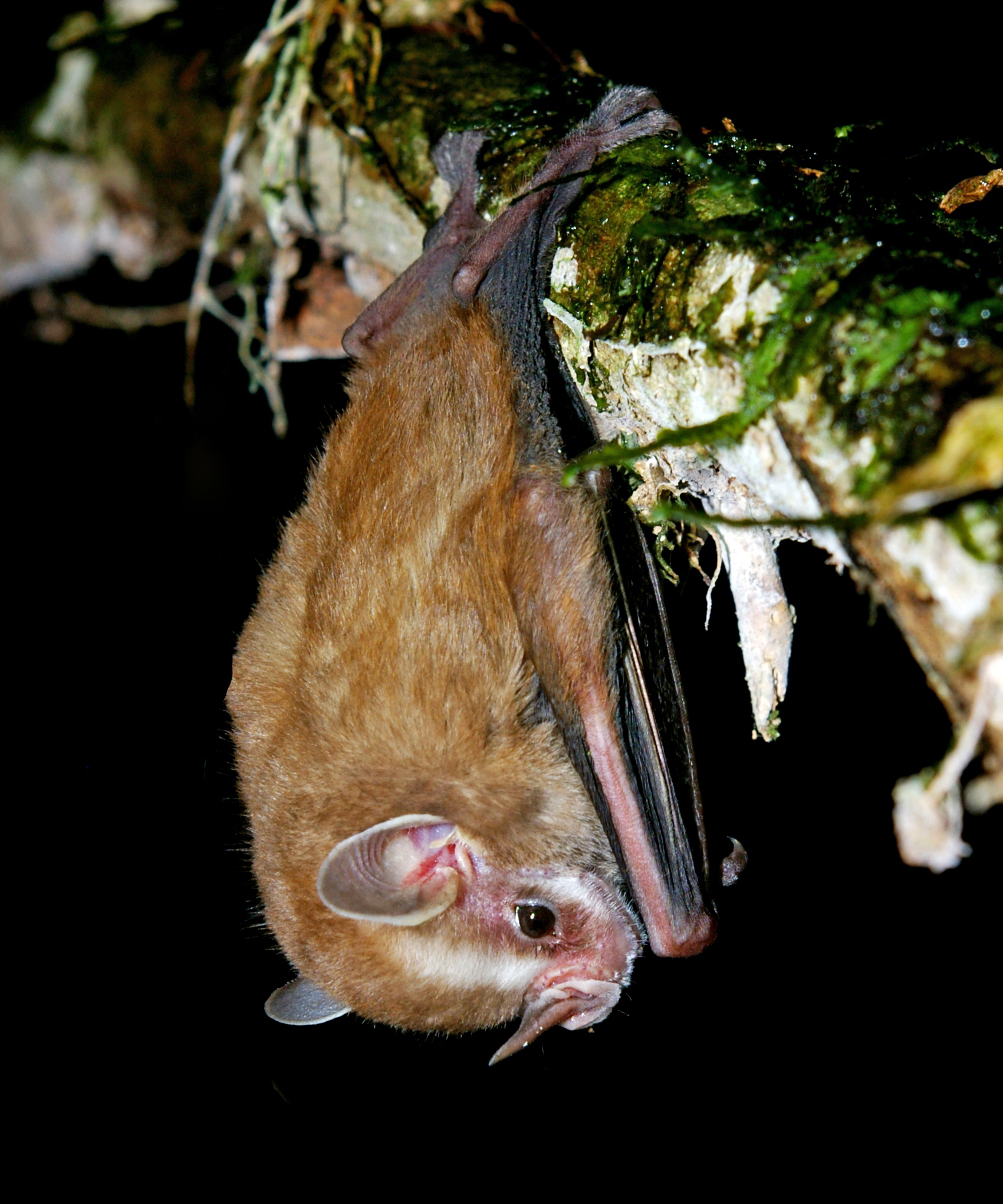
Southern little yellow-eared bat

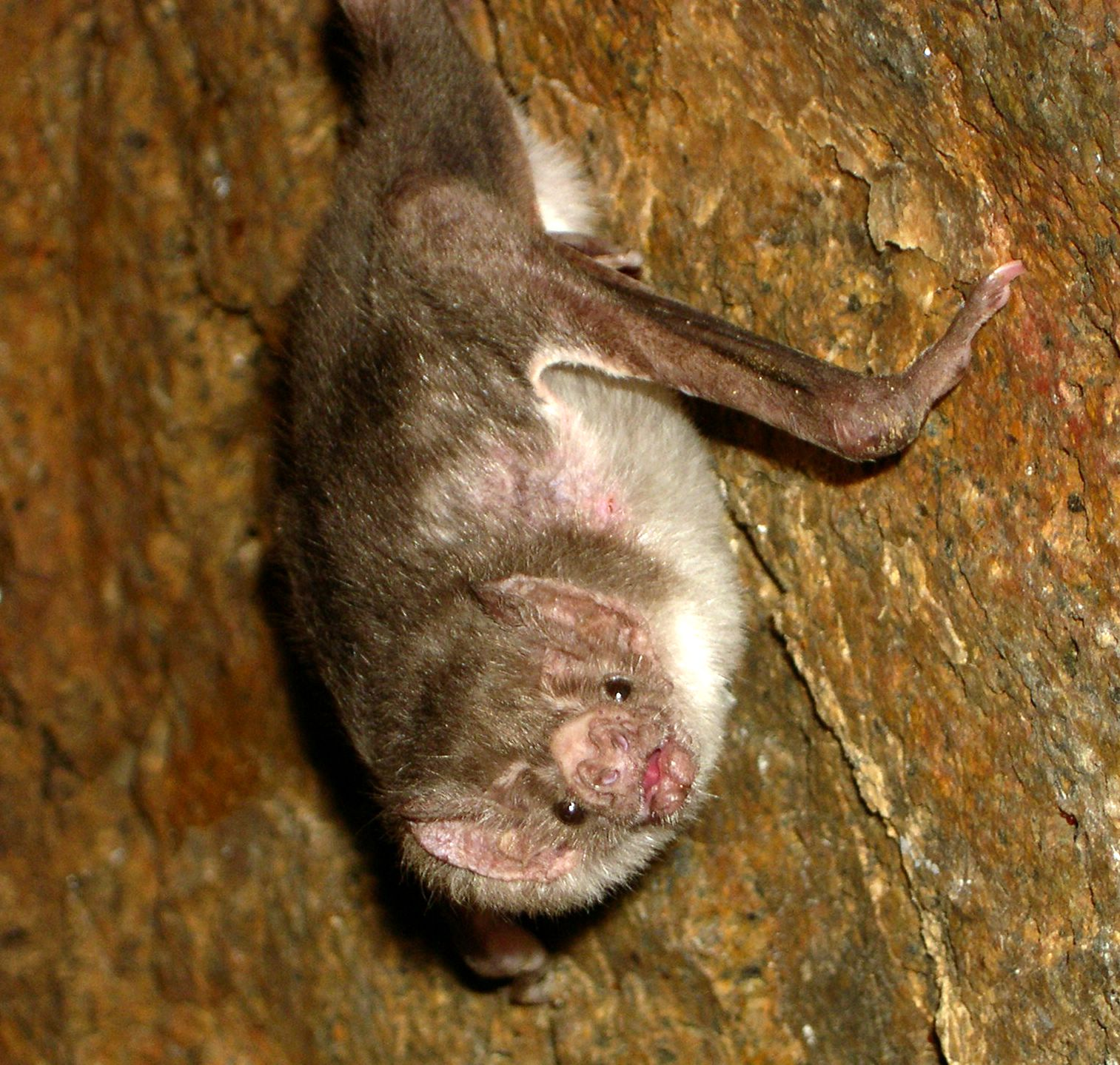
Common vampire bat

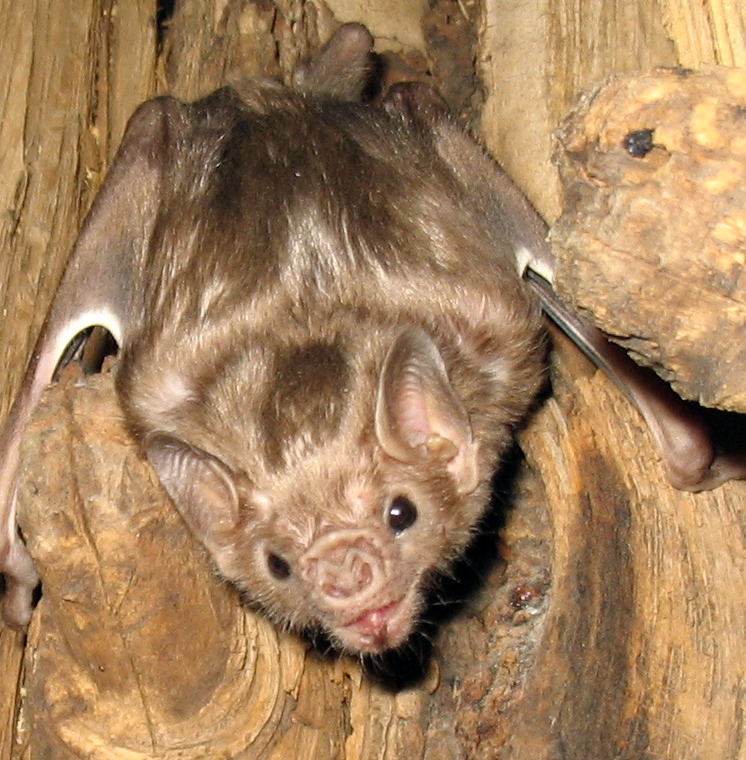
White-winged vampire bat

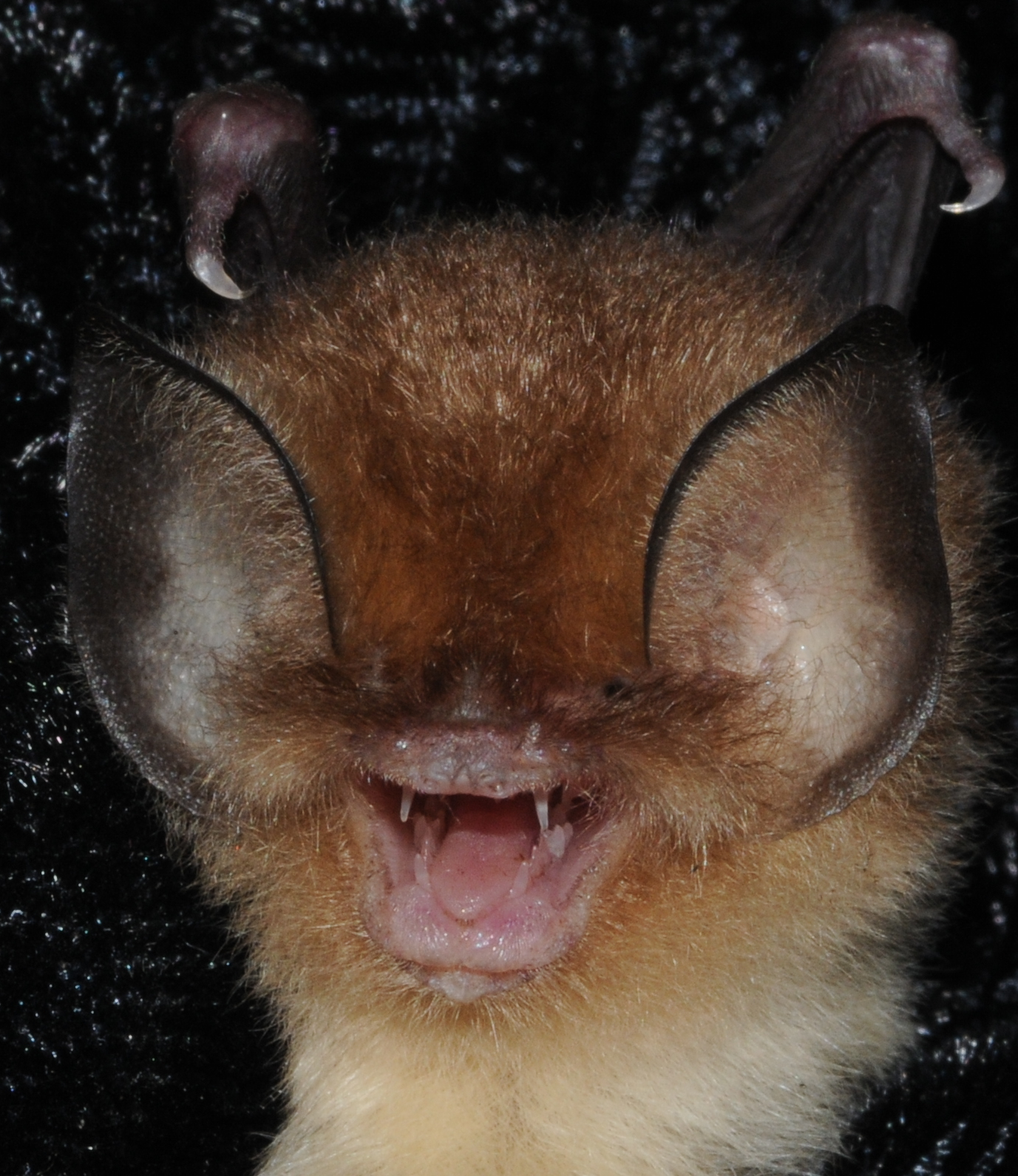
Cuban funnel-eared bat

- Family: Phyllostomidae (leaf-nosed bats)
  - Subfamily: Phyllostominae
    - Genus: Chrotopterus
      - Big-eared woolly bat, Chrotopterus auritus LC
    - Genus: Glyphonycteris
      - Behn's bat, Glyphonycteris behnii DD
      - Davies's big-eared bat, Glyphonycteris daviesi LC
      - Tricolored big-eared bat, Glyphonycteris sylvestris LC
    - Genus: Lampronycteris
      - Yellow-throated big-eared bat, Lampronycteris brachyotis LC
    - Genus: Lonchorhina
      - Tomes's sword-nosed bat, Lonchorhina aurita LC
      - Fernandez's sword-nosed bat, Lonchorhina fernandezi EN
      - Northern sword-nosed bat, Lonchorhina inusitata DD
      - Marinkelle's sword-nosed bat, Lonchorhina marinkellei EN
      - Orinoco sword-nosed bat, Lonchorhina orinocensis VU
    - Genus: Lophostoma
      - Lophostoma aequatorialis DD
      - Pygmy round-eared bat, Lophostoma brasiliense LC
      - Carriker's round-eared bat, Lophostoma carrikeri LC
      - Schultz's round-eared bat, Lophostoma schulzi LC
      - White-throated round-eared bat, Lophostoma silvicolum LC
      - Lophostoma yasuni DD
    - Genus: Macrophyllum
      - Long-legged bat, Macrophyllum macrophyllum LC
    - Genus: Micronycteris
      - Brosset's big-eared bat, Micronycteris brosseti DD
      - Micronycteris giovanniae
      - Hairy big-eared bat, Micronycteris hirsuta LC
      - Pirlot's big-eared bat, Micronycteris homezi
      - Matses' big-eared bat, Micronycteris matses DD
      - Little big-eared bat, Micronycteris megalotis LC
      - Common big-eared bat, Micronycteris microtis LC
      - White-bellied big-eared bat, Micronycteris minuta LC
      - Sanborn's big-eared bat, Micronycteris sanborni DD
      - Schmidts's big-eared bat, Micronycteris schmidtorum LC
    - Genus: Mimon
      - Golden bat, Mimon bennettii LC
      - Cozumelan golden bat, Mimon cozumelae LC
      - Striped hairy-nosed bat, Mimon crenulatum LC
      - Koepcke's hairy-nosed bat, Mimon koepckeae DD
    - Genus: Neonycteris
      - Least big-eared bat, Neonycteris pusilla VU
    - Genus: Phylloderma
      - Pale-faced bat, Phylloderma stenops LC
    - Genus: Phyllostomus
      - Pale spear-nosed bat, Phyllostomus discolor LC
      - Lesser spear-nosed bat, Phyllostomus elongatus LC
      - Greater spear-nosed bat, Phyllostomus hastatus LC
      - Guianan spear-nosed bat, Phyllostomus latifolius LC
    - Genus: Tonatia
      - Greater round-eared bat, Tonatia bidens DD
      - Stripe-headed round-eared bat, Tonatia saurophila LC
    - Genus: Trachops
      - Fringe-lipped bat, Trachops cirrhosus LC
    - Genus: Trinycteris
      - Niceforo's big-eared bat, Trinycteris nicefori LC
    - Genus: Vampyrum
      - Spectral bat, Vampyrum spectrum NT
  - Subfamily: Glossophaginae
    - Genus: Anoura
      - Anoura aequatoris
      - Cadena's tailless bat, Anoura cadenai
      - Tailed tailless bat, Anoura caudifer LC
      - Handley's tailless bat, Anoura cultrata NT
      - Tube-lipped nectar bat, Anoura fistulata DD
      - Geoffroy's tailless bat, Anoura geoffroyi LC
      - Broad-toothed tailless bat, Anoura latidens LC
      - Luis Manuel's tailless bat, Anoura luismanueli LC
    - Genus: Choeroniscus
      - Godman's long-tailed bat, Choeroniscus godmani LC
      - Minor long-nosed long-tongued bat, Choeroniscus minor LC
      - Greater long-tailed bat, Choeroniscus periosus VU
    - Genus: Glossophaga
      - Commissaris's long-tongued bat, Glossophaga commissarisi LC
      - Miller's long-tongued bat, Glossophaga longirostris DD
      - Pallas's long-tongued bat, Glossophaga soricina LC
    - Genus: Leptonycteris
      - Southern long-nosed bat, Leptonycteris curasoae VU
    - Genus: Lichonycteris
      - Dark long-tongued bat, Lichonycteris obscura LC
    - Genus: Lionycteris
      - Chestnut long-tongued bat, Lionycteris spurrelli LC
    - Genus: Lonchophylla
      - Bokermann's nectar bat, Lonchophylla bokermanni DD
      - Lonchophylla cadenai
      - Chocoan long-tongued bat, Lonchophylla chocoana DD
      - Goldman's nectar bat, Lonchophylla concava NT
      - Dekeyser's nectar bat, Lonchophylla dekeyseri NT
      - Lonchophylla fornicata
      - Handley's nectar bat, Lonchophylla handleyi LC
      - Western nectar bat, Lonchophylla hesperia VU
      - Godman's nectar bat, Lonchophylla mordax LC
      - Orcés's long-tongued bat, Lonchophylla orcesi DD
      - Lonchophylla pattoni
      - Orange nectar bat, Lonchophylla robusta LC
      - Thomas's nectar bat, Lonchophylla thomasi LC
    - Genus: Platalina
      - Long-snouted bat, Platalina genovensium NT
    - Genus: Scleronycteris
      - Ega long-tongued bat, Scleronycteris ega LC
  - Subfamily: Carolliinae
    - Genus: Carollia
      - Benkeith's short-tailed bat, Carollia benkeithi
      - Silky short-tailed bat, Carollia brevicauda LC
      - Chestnut short-tailed bat, Carollia castanea LC
      - Colombian short-tailed bat, Carollia colombiana
      - Manu short-tailed bat, Carollia manu LC
      - Mono's short-tailed bat, Carollia monohernandezi
      - Seba's short-tailed bat, Carollia perspicillata LC
    - Genus: Rhinophylla
      - Hairy little fruit bat, Rhinophylla alethina NT
      - Fischer's little fruit bat, Rhinophylla fischerae LC
      - Dwarf little fruit bat, Rhinophylla pumilio LC
  - Subfamily: Stenodermatinae
    - Genus: Ametrida
      - Little white-shouldered bat, Ametrida centurio LC
    - Genus: Artibeus
      - Large fruit-eating bat, Artibeus amplus LC
      - Brown fruit-eating bat, Artibeus concolor LC
      - Fringed fruit-eating bat, Artibeus fimbriatus LC
      - Fraternal fruit-eating bat, Artibeus fraterculus LC
      - Jamaican fruit bat, Artibeus jamaicensis LC
      - Great fruit-eating bat, Artibeus lituratus LC
      - Dark fruit-eating bat, Artibeus obscurus LC
      - Flat-faced fruit-eating bat, Artibeus planirostris LC
    - Genus: Centurio
      - Wrinkle-faced bat, Centurio senex LC
    - Genus: Chiroderma
      - Brazilian big-eyed bat, Chiroderma doriae LC
      - Salvin's big-eyed bat, Chiroderma salvini LC
      - Little big-eyed bat, Chiroderma trinitatum LC
      - Hairy big-eyed bat, Chiroderma villosum LC
    - Genus: Dermanura
      - Andersen's fruit-eating bat, Dermanura anderseni LC
      - Bogota fruit-eating bat, Dermanura bogotensis LC
      - Gervais's fruit-eating bat, Dermanura cinerea LC
      - Silver fruit-eating bat, Dermanura glauca LC
      - Gnome fruit-eating bat, Dermanura gnoma LC
      - Pygmy fruit-eating bat, Dermanura phaeotis LC
      - Dermanura rava NE
      - Rosenberg's fruit-eating bat, Dermanura rosenbergi DD
      - Toltec fruit-eating bat, Dermanura tolteca LC
      - Thomas's fruit-eating bat, Dermanura watsoni LC
    - Genus: Enchisthenes
      - Velvety fruit-eating bat, Enchisthenes hartii LC
    - Genus: Mesophylla
      - MacConnell's bat, Mesophylla macconnelli LC
    - Genus: Platyrrhinus
      - Alberico's broad-nosed bat, Platyrrhinus alberico LC
      - Slender broad-nosed bat, Platyrrhinus angustirostris
      - Platyrrhinus aquilus
      - Eldorado broad-nosed bat, Platyrrhinus aurarius LC
      - Short-headed broad-nosed bat, Platyrrhinus brachycephalus LC
      - Choco broad-nosed bat, Platyrrhinus chocoensis EN
      - Thomas's broad-nosed bat, Platyrrhinus dorsalis LC
      - Brown-bellied broad-nosed bat, Platyrrhinus fusciventris
      - Heller's broad-nosed bat, Platyrrhinus helleri LC
      - Platyrrhinus incarum
      - Buffy broad-nosed bat, Platyrrhinus infuscus LC
      - Ismael's broad-nosed bat, Platyrrhinus ismaeli VU
      - White-lined broad-nosed bat, Platyrrhinus lineatus LC
      - Quechua broad-nosed bat, Platyrrhinus masu LC
      - Matapalo broad-nosed bat, Platyrrhinus matapalensis NT
      - Geoffroy's rayed bat, Platyrrhinus nigellus LC
      - Platyrrhinus nitelinea
      - Recife broad-nosed bat, Platyrrhinus recifinus LC
      - Shadowy broad-nosed bat, Platyrrhinus umbratus DD
      - Greater broad-nosed bat, Platyrrhinus vittatus LC
    - Genus: Sphaeronycteris
      - Visored bat, Sphaeronycteris toxophyllum DD
    - Genus: Pygoderma
      - Ipanema bat, Pygoderma bilabiatum LC
    - Genus: Sturnira
      - Aratathomas's yellow-shouldered bat, Sturnira aratathomasi NT
      - Bidentate yellow-shouldered bat, Sturnira bidens LC
      - Bogota yellow-shouldered bat, Sturnira bogotensis LC
      - Hairy yellow-shouldered bat, Sturnira erythromos LC
      - Chocó yellow-shouldered bat, Sturnira koopmanhilli
      - Little yellow-shouldered bat, Sturnira lilium LC
      - Highland yellow-shouldered bat, Sturnira ludovici LC
      - Louis's yellow-shouldered bat, Sturnira luisi LC
      - Greater yellow-shouldered bat, Sturnira magna LC
      - Mistratoan yellow-shouldered bat, Sturnira mistratensis DD
      - Talamancan yellow-shouldered bat, Sturnira mordax NT
      - Lesser yellow-shouldered bat, Sturnira nana EN
      - Tschudi's yellow-shouldered bat, Sturnira oporaphilum NT
      - Soriano's yellow-shouldered bat, Sturnira sorianoi DD
      - Tilda's yellow-shouldered bat, Sturnira tildae LC
    - Genus: Uroderma
      - Tent-making bat, Uroderma bilobatum LC
      - Brown tent-making bat, Uroderma magnirostrum LC
    - Genus: Vampyressa
      - Bidentate yellow-eared bat, Vampyressa bidens LC
      - Brock's yellow-eared bat, Vampyressa brocki LC
      - Melissa's yellow-eared bat, Vampyressa melissa VU
      - Striped yellow-eared bat, Vampyressa nymphaea LC
      - Southern little yellow-eared bat, Vampyressa pusilla DD
      - Northern little yellow-eared bat, Vampyressa thyone LC
    - Genus: Vampyrodes
      - Great stripe-faced bat, Vampyrodes caraccioli LC
  - Subfamily: Desmodontinae
    - Genus: Desmodus
      - Common vampire bat, Desmodus rotundus LC
    - Genus: Diaemus
      - White-winged vampire bat, Diaemus youngi LC
    - Genus: Diphylla
      - Hairy-legged vampire bat, Diphylla ecaudata LC
- Family: Natalidae (funnel-eared bats)
  - Genus: Chilonatalus
    - Cuban funnel-eared bat, Chilonatalus micropus NT
  - Genus: Natalus
    - Brazilian funnel-eared bat, Natalus espiritosantensis NT
    - Trinidadian funnel-eared bat, Natalus tumidirostris LC
- Family: Furipteridae (thumbless bats)
  - Genus: Amorphochilus
    - Smoky bat, Amorphochilus schnablii EN
  - Genus: Furipterus
    - Thumbless bat, Furipterus horrens LC
- Family: Thyropteridae (disc-winged bats)
  - Genus: Thyroptera
    - Peters's disk-winged bat, Thyroptera discifera LC
    - de Vivo's disk-winged bat, Thyroptera devivoi DD
    - LaVal's disk-winged bat, Thyroptera lavali DD
    - Spix's disk-winged bat, Thyroptera tricolor LC

===== Order: Carnivora (carnivorans) =====
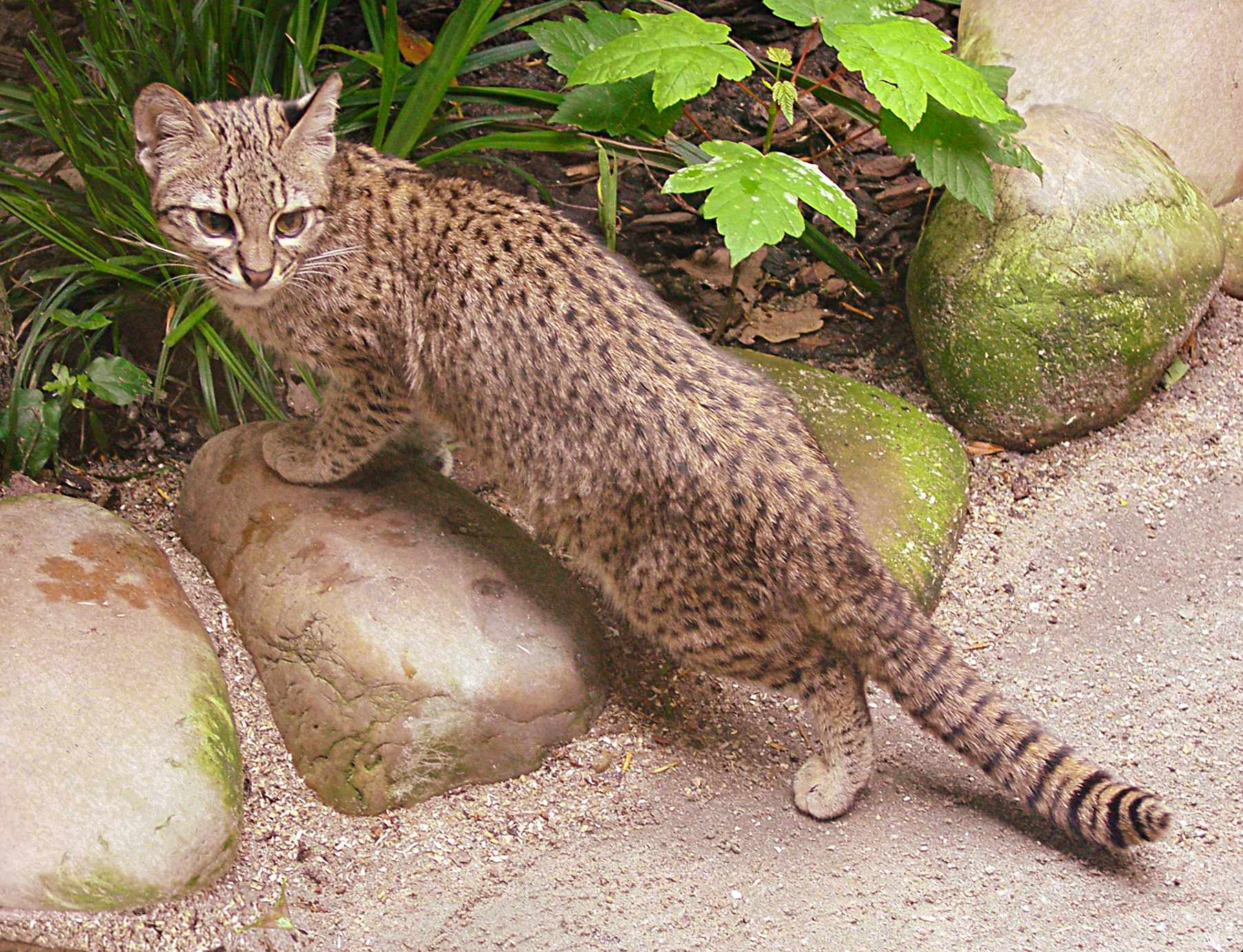
Geoffroy's cat

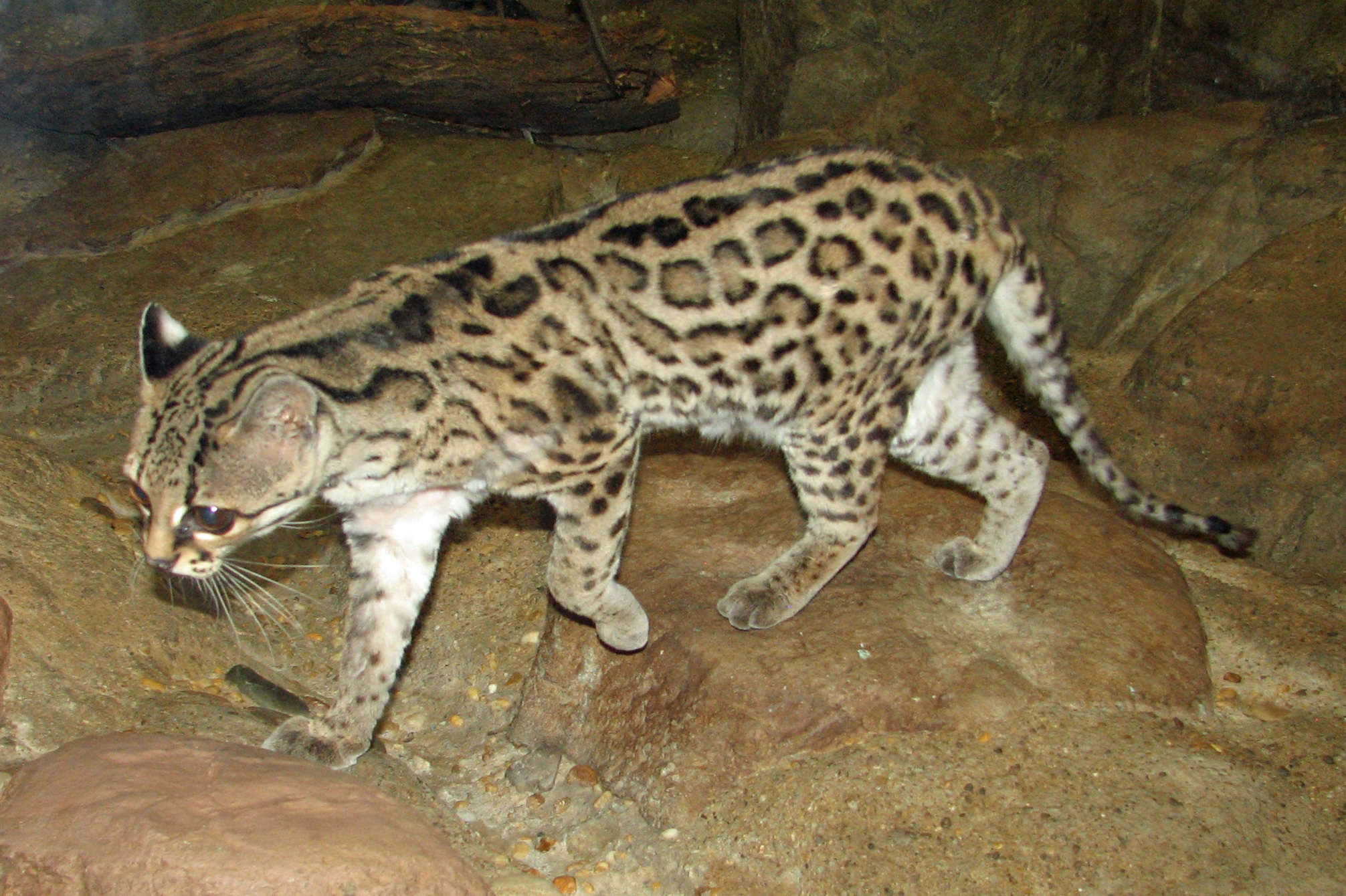
Margay

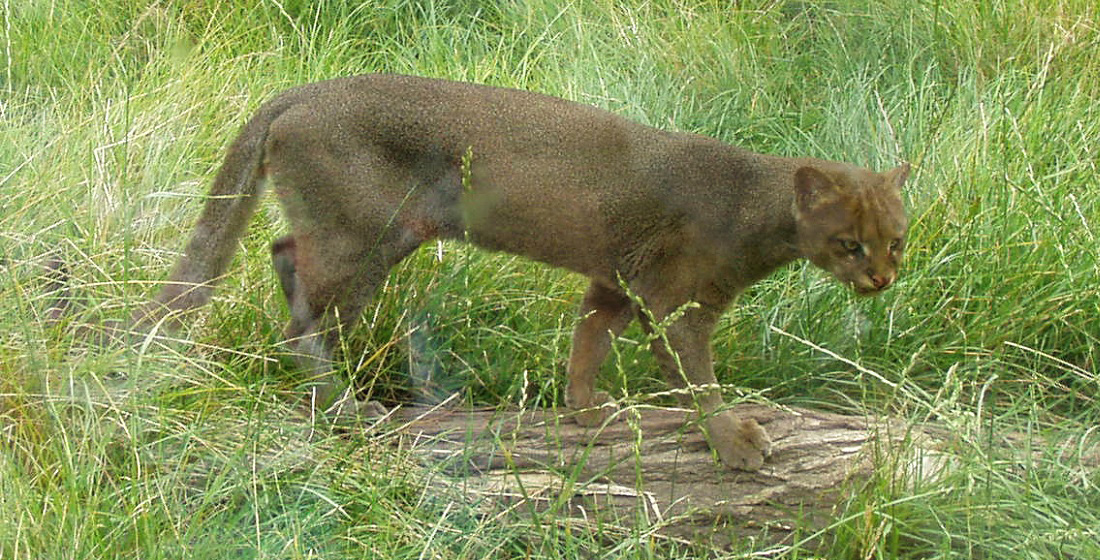
Jaguarundi

Jaguar

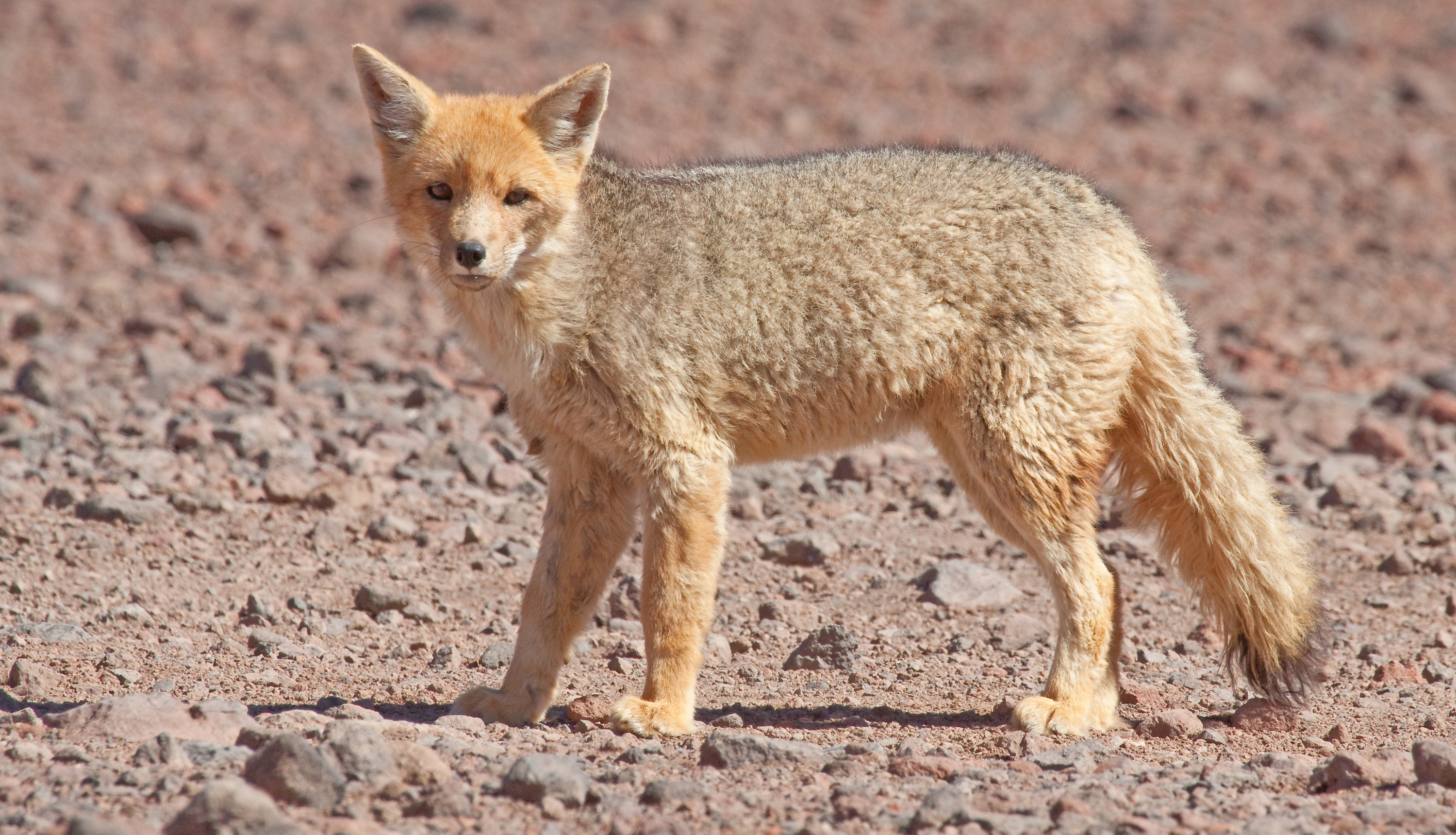
Culpeo

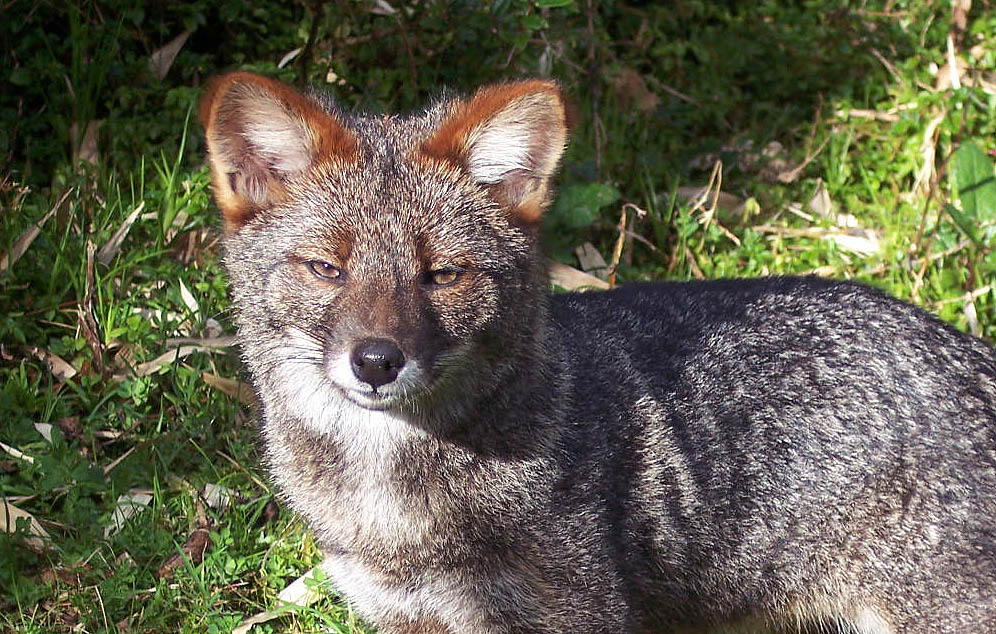
Darwin's fox

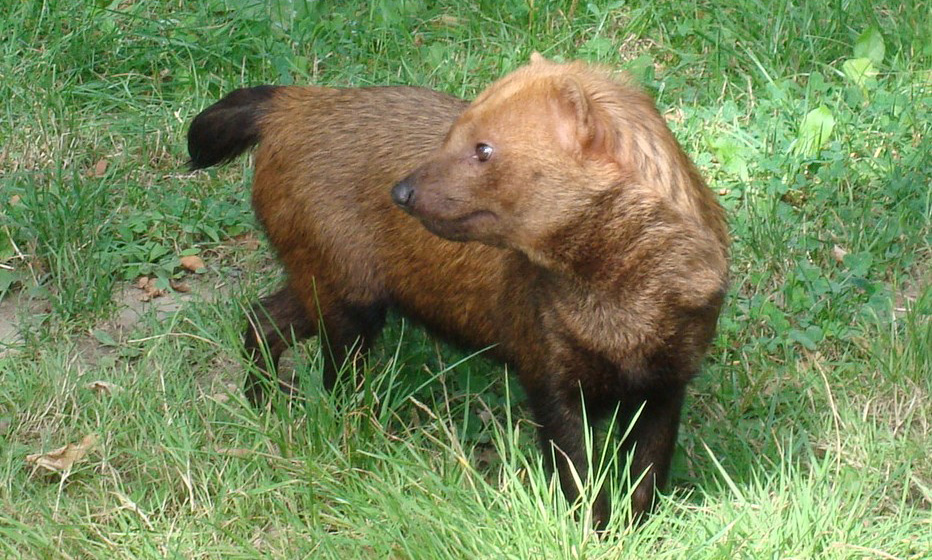
Bush dog

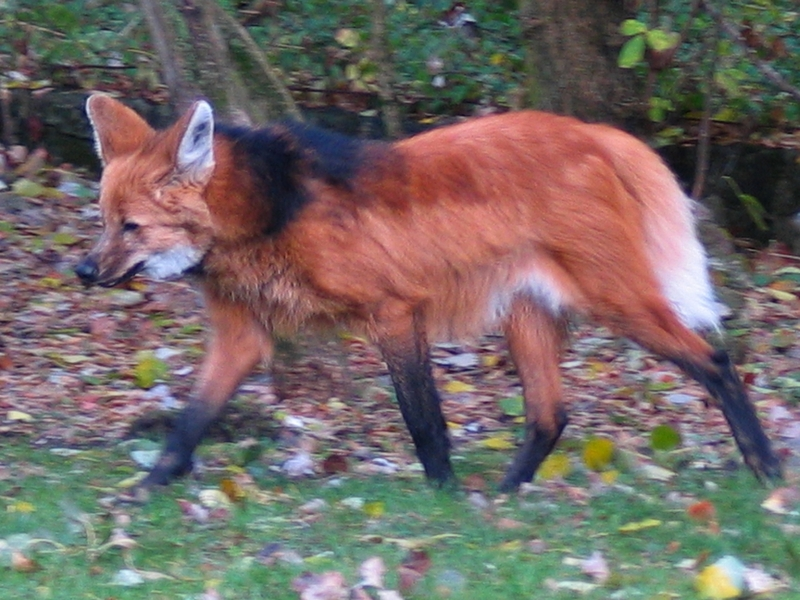
Maned wolf

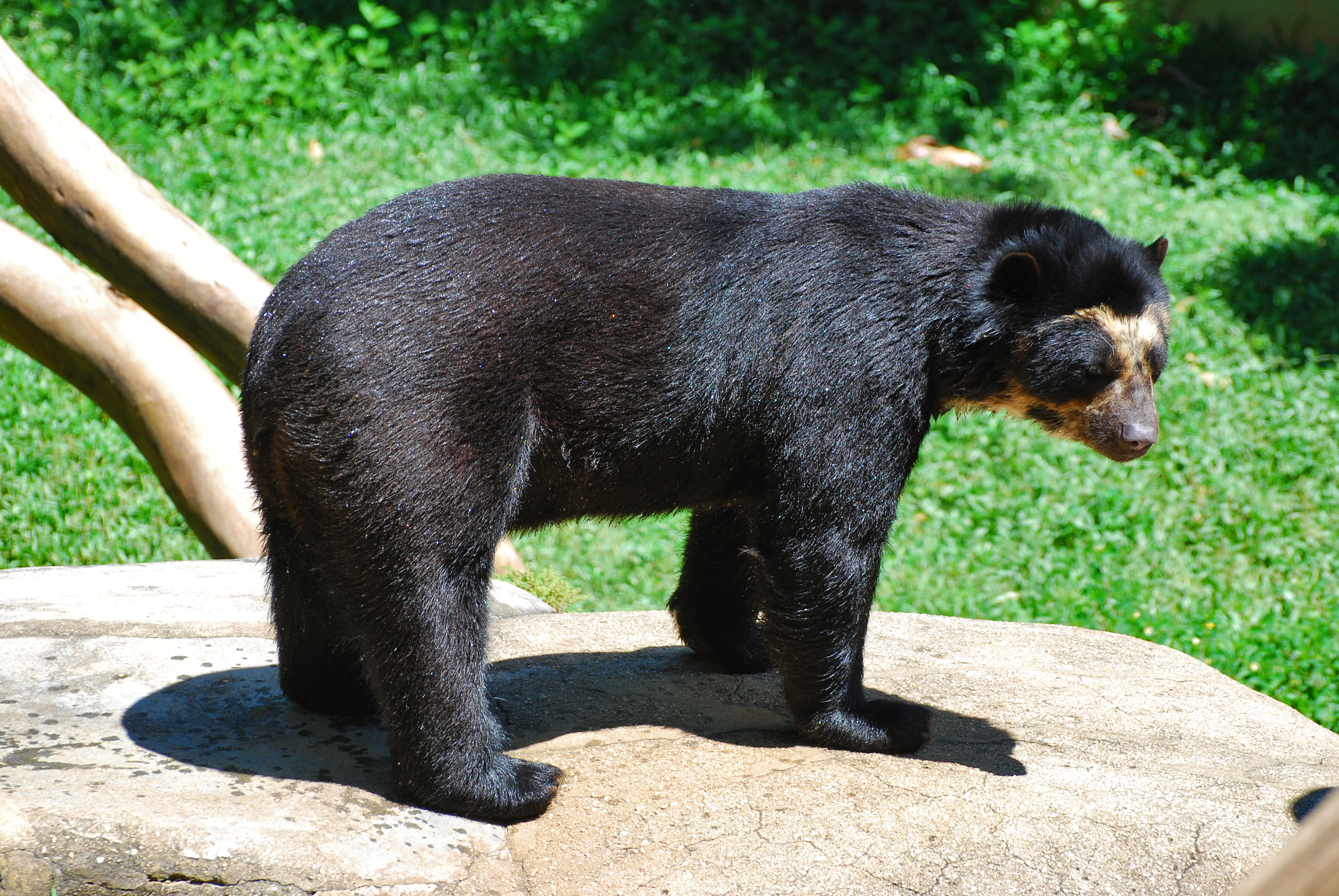
Spectacled bear

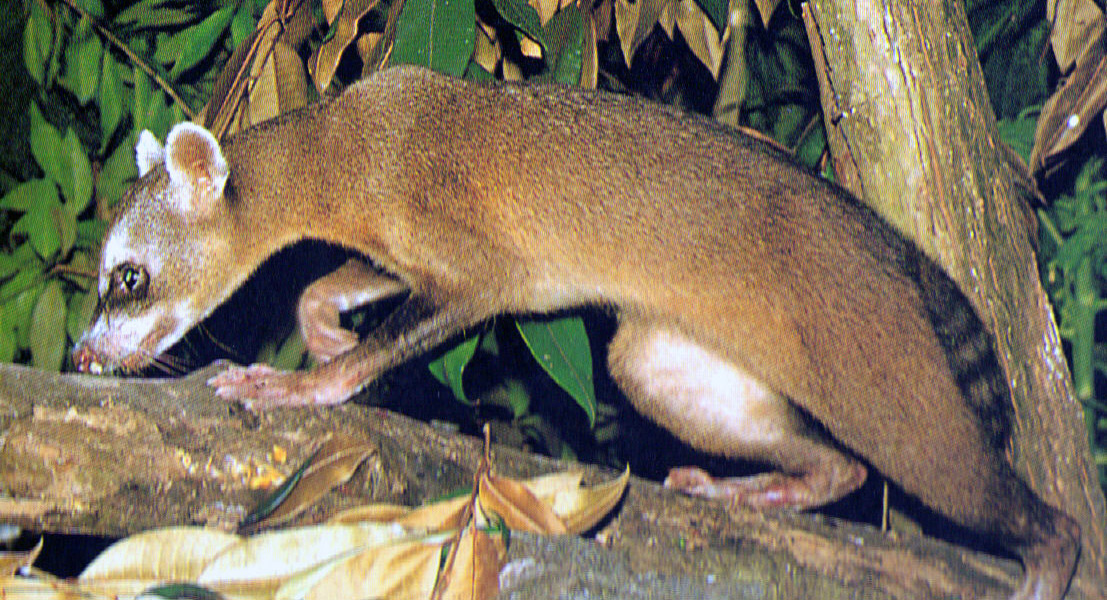
Crab-eating raccoon

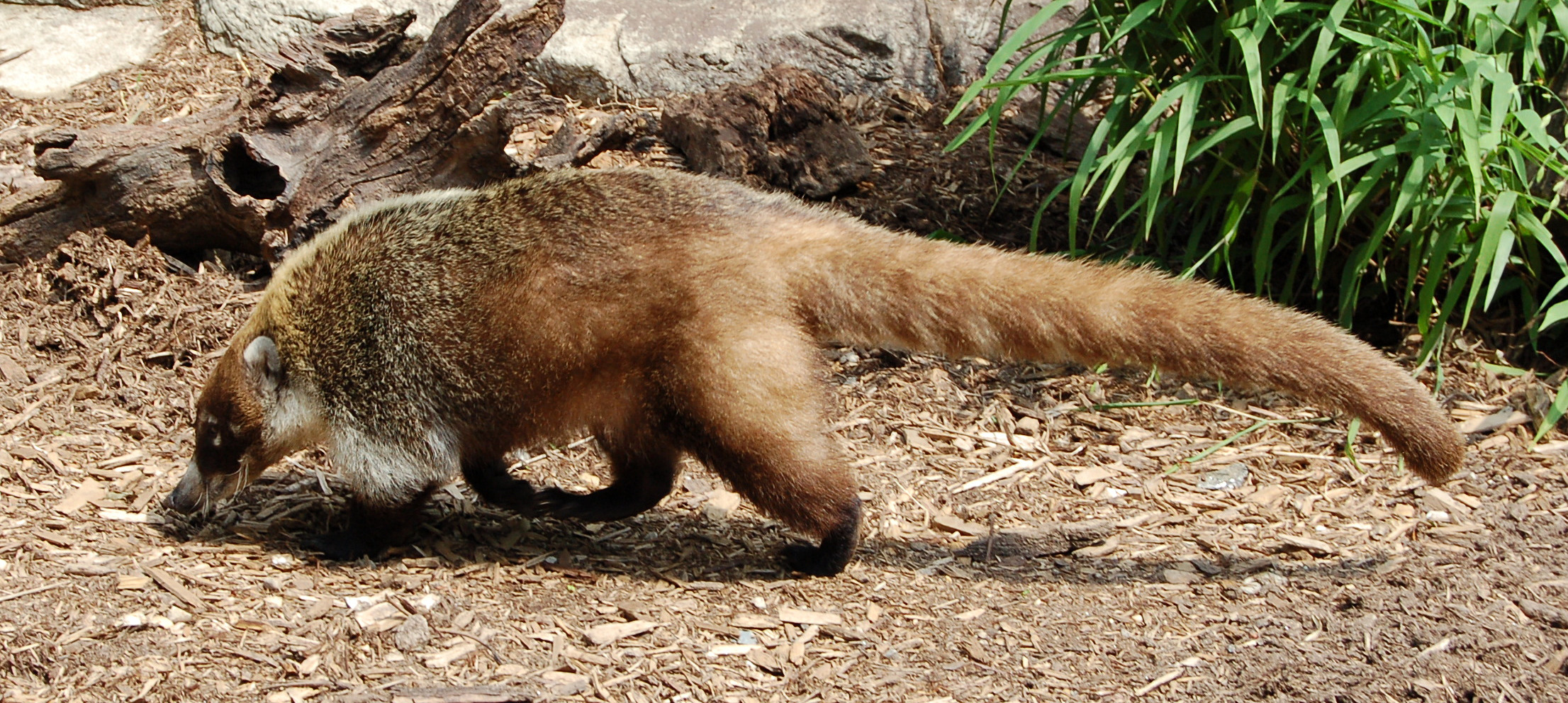
White-nosed coati

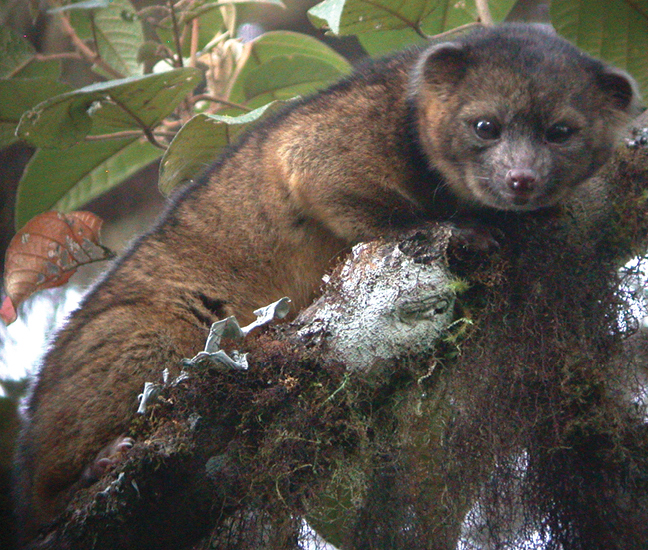
Olinguito

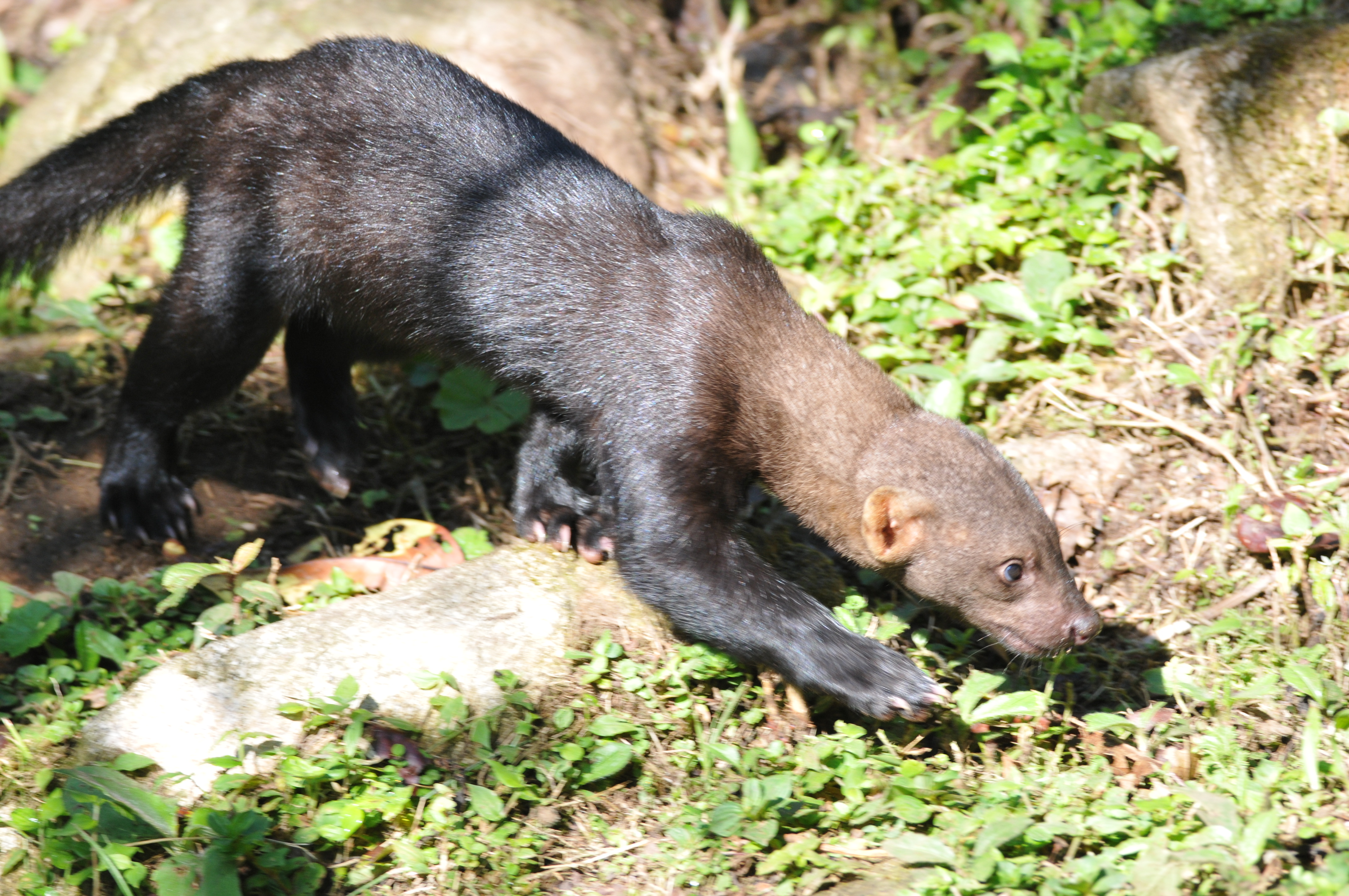
Tayra

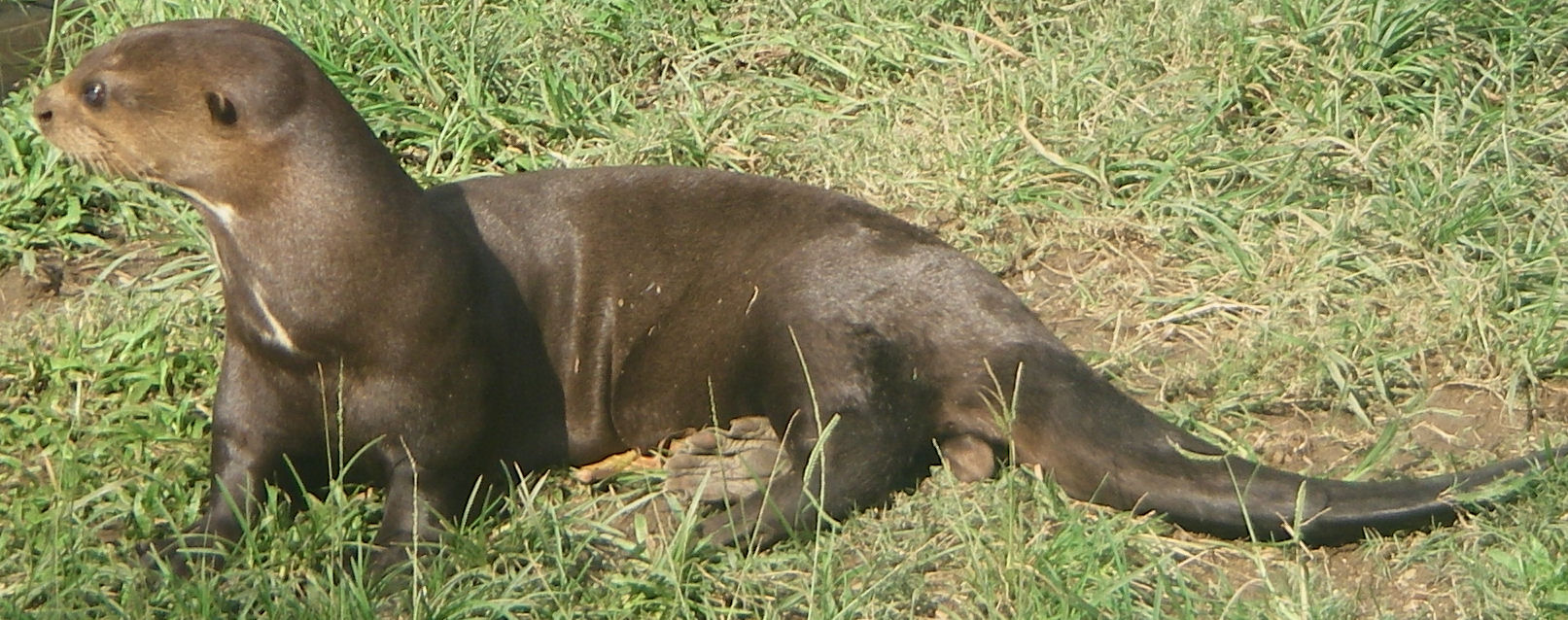
Giant otter

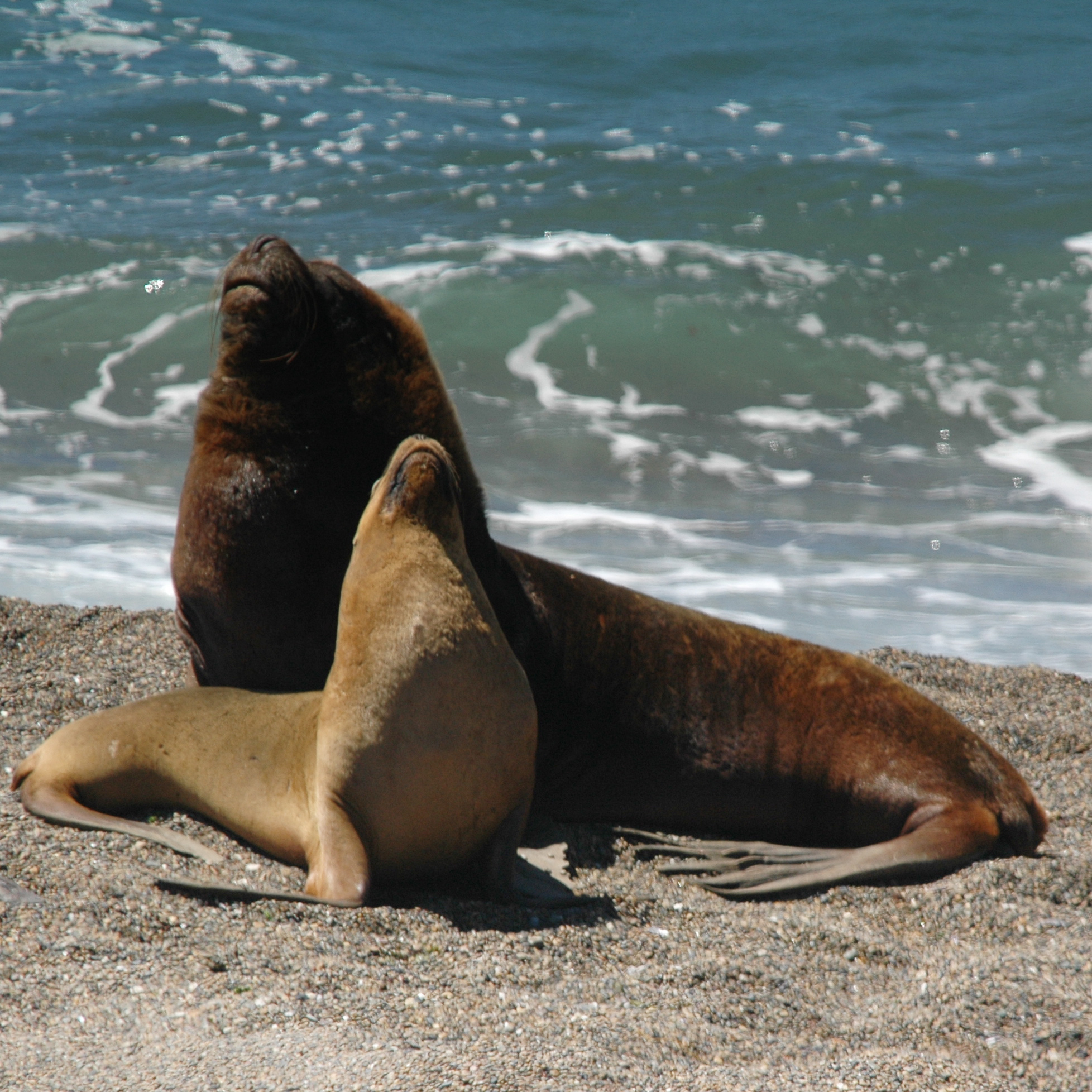
South American sea lions

There are over 260 species of carnivorans, the majority of which feed primarily on meat. They have a characteristic skull shape and dentition. South America is notable for its diversity of canids, having more genera than any other continent in spite of their relatively brief history there. South America's felid diversity is also greater than that of North America north of Mexico, while its mustelid diversity is comparable and its mephitid and ursid diversities are lower. Its procyonid diversity is somewhat less than that of Central America, the center of the family's recent evolution. The diversification of canids and felids in South America was partly a consequence of the inability of the continent's native avian and metatherian predators to compete effectively following the Great American Interchange.

- Suborder: Feliformia
  - Family: Felidae (cats)
    - Subfamily: Felinae
      - Genus: Herpailurus
        - Jaguarundi, Herpailurus yagouaroundi LC
      - Genus: Puma
        - Cougar, Puma concolor LC
      - Genus: Leopardus
        - Pampas cat, Leopardus colocolo NT
        - Geoffroy's cat, Leopardus geoffroyi LC
        - Kodkod, Leopardus guigna VU
        - Southern tigrina, Leopardus guttulus VU
        - Andean mountain cat, Leopardus jacobita EN
        - Ocelot, Leopardus pardalis LC
        - Oncilla, Leopardus tigrinus VU
        - Margay, Leopardus wiedii NT
    - Subfamily: Pantherinae
      - Genus: Panthera
        - Jaguar, Panthera onca NT
- Suborder: Caniformia
  - Family: Canidae (dogs, foxes)
    - Genus: Lycalopex
      - Culpeo, Lycalopex culpaeus LC
      - Darwin's fox, Lycalopex fulvipes EN
      - South American gray fox, Lycalopex griseus LC
      - Pampas fox, Lycalopex gymnocercus LC
      - Sechuran fox, Lycalopex sechurae NT
      - Hoary fox, Lycalopex vetulus LC
    - Genus: Cerdocyon
      - Crab-eating fox, Cerdocyon thous LC
    - Genus: Atelocynus
      - Short-eared dog, Atelocynus microtis NT
    - Genus: Speothos
      - Bush dog, Speothos venaticus NT
    - Genus: Chrysocyon
      - Maned wolf, Chrysocyon brachyurus NT
    - Genus: Urocyon
      - Gray fox, Urocyon cinereoargenteus LC
  - Family: Ursidae (bears)
    - Genus: Tremarctos
      - Spectacled bear, Tremarctos ornatus VU
  - Family: Procyonidae (raccoons, coatis and allies)
    - Genus: Procyon
      - Crab-eating raccoon, Procyon cancrivorus LC
    - Genus: Nasua
      - White-nosed coati, Nasua narica LC
      - South American coati, Nasua nasua LC
    - Genus: Nasuella
      - Eastern mountain coati, Nasuella meridensis EN
      - Western mountain coati, Nasuella olivacea NT
    - Genus: Potos
      - Kinkajou, Potos flavus LC
    - Genus: Bassaricyon
      - Eastern lowland olingo, Bassaricyon alleni LC
      - Western lowland olingo, Bassaricyon medius LC
      - Olinguito, Bassaricyon neblina NT
  - Family: Mustelidae (weasels, otters)
    - Genus: Neogale
      - Amazon weasel, Neogale africana LC
      - Colombian weasel, Neogale felipei VU
      - Long-tailed weasel, Neogale frenata LC
    - Genus: Eira
      - Tayra, Eira barbara LC
    - Genus: Galictis
      - Lesser grison, Galictis cuja LC
      - Greater grison, Galictis vittata LC
    - Genus: Lyncodon
      - Patagonian weasel, Lyncodon patagonicus LC
    - Genus: Lontra
      - Marine otter, Lontra felina EN
      - Neotropical river otter, Lontra longicaudis NT
      - Southern river otter, Lontra provocax EN
    - Genus: Pteronura
      - Giant otter, Pteronura brasiliensis EN
  - Family: Mephitidae (skunks)
    - Genus: Conepatus
      - Molina's hog-nosed skunk, Conepatus chinga LC
      - Humboldt's hog-nosed skunk, Conepatus humboldtii LC
      - Striped hog-nosed skunk, Conepatus semistriatus LC
  - Clade: Pinnipedia (seals, sea lions and walruses)
    - Family: Otariidae (eared seals, sea lions)
      - Genus: Arctocephalus
        - South American fur seal, Arctocephalus australis LC
        - Galápagos fur seal, Arctocephalus galapagoensis EN
        - Antarctic fur seal, Arctocephalus gazella LC
        - Juan Fernández fur seal, Arctocephalus philippii LC
        - Subantarctic fur seal, Arctocephalus tropicalis LC
      - Genus: Otaria
        - South American sea lion, Otaria flavescens LC
      - Genus: Zalophus
        - Galápagos sea lion, Zalophus wollebaeki EN
    - Family: Phocidae (earless seals)
      - Genus: Hydrurga
        - Leopard seal, Hydrurga leptonyx LC
      - Genus: Leptonychotes
        - Weddell seal, Leptonychotes weddellii LC
      - Genus: Lobodon
        - Crabeater seal, Lobodon carcinophaga LC
      - Genus: Mirounga
        - Southern elephant seal, Mirounga leonina LC

===== Order: Perissodactyla (odd-toed ungulates) =====
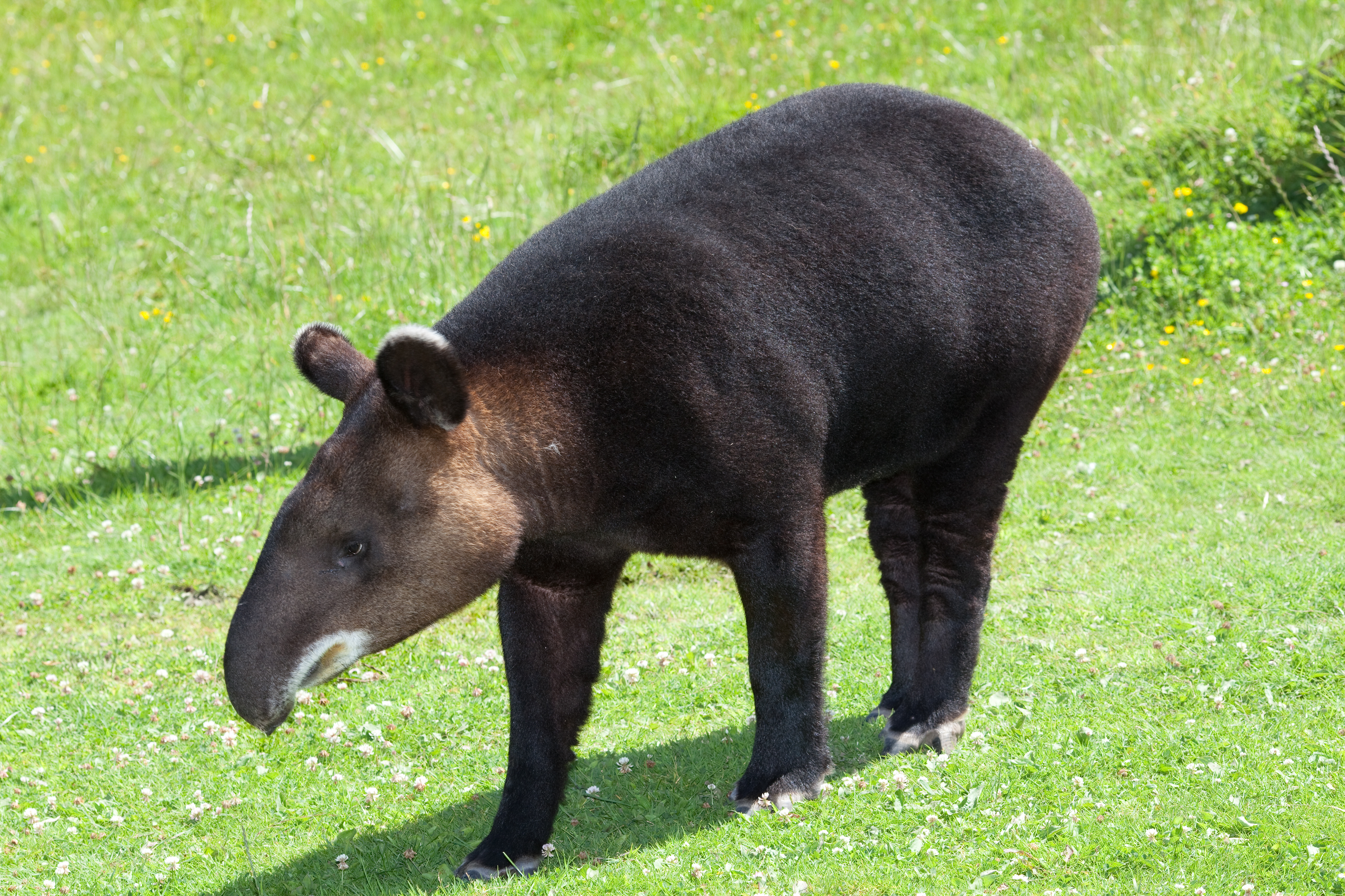
Mountain tapir

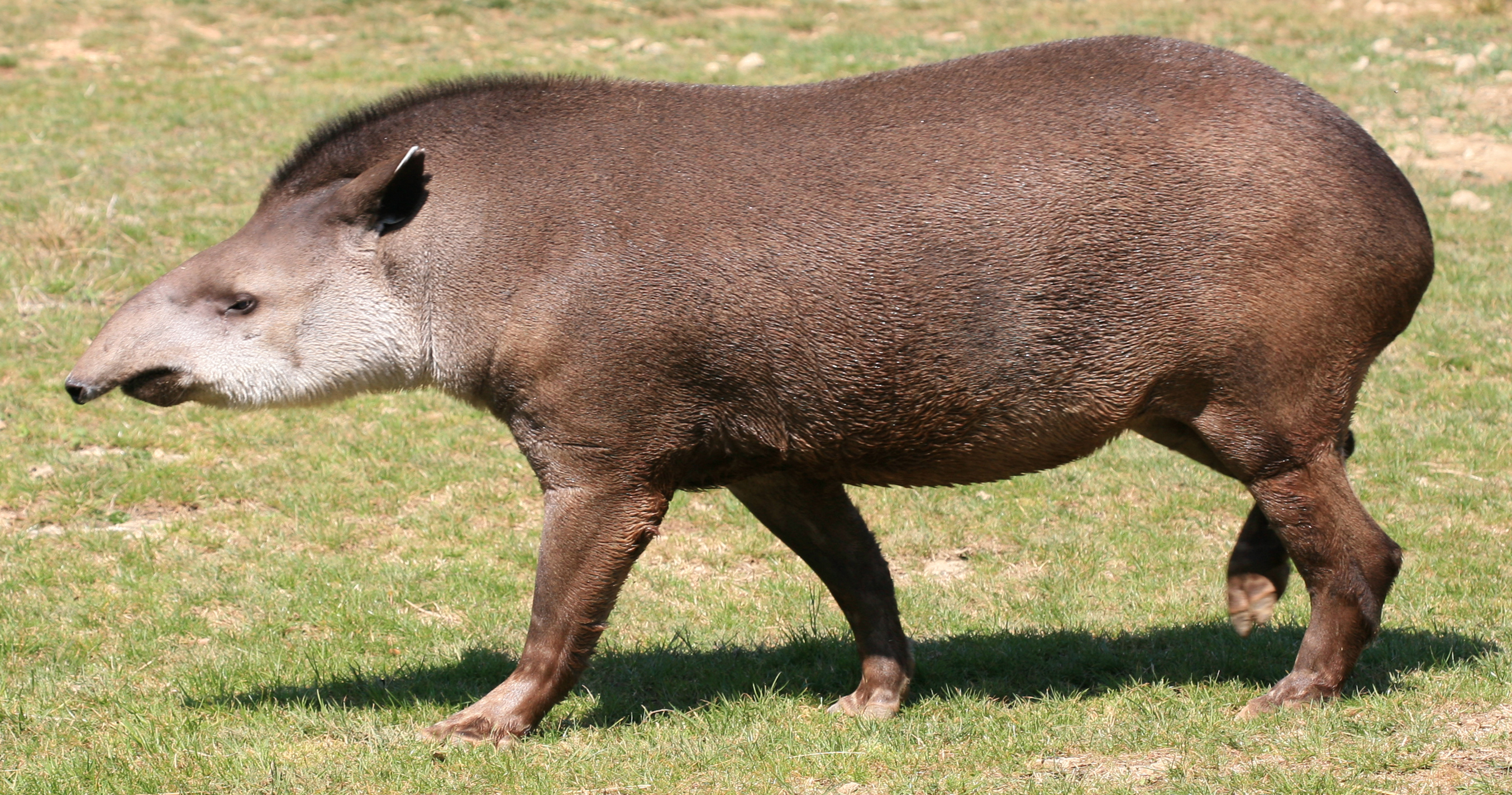
Lowland tapir

The odd-toed ungulates are browsing and grazing mammals. They are usually large to very large, and have relatively simple stomachs and a large middle toe. Following the interchange with North America, South America's odd-toed ungulates included equids of genus Equus as well as tapirs. Equids died out in both North and South America around the time of the first arrival of humans, while tapirs died out in most of North America but survived in Central and South America. South America also once had a great diversity of ungulates of native origin, but these dwindled after the interchange with North America, and disappeared entirely following the arrival of humans. Sequencing of collagen from fossils of one recently extinct species each of notoungulates and litopterns has indicated that these orders comprise a sister group to the perissodactyls. If, as some evidence suggests, perissodactyls originated in India, both ungulate groups may have been of Gondwanan origin, despite being laurasiatheres.

- Family: Tapiridae (tapirs)
  - Genus: Tapirus
    - Baird's tapir, Tapirus bairdii EN
    - Mountain tapir, Tapirus pinchaque EN
    - Lowland tapir, Tapirus terrestris VU

===== Order: Artiodactyla (even-toed ungulates and cetaceans) =====
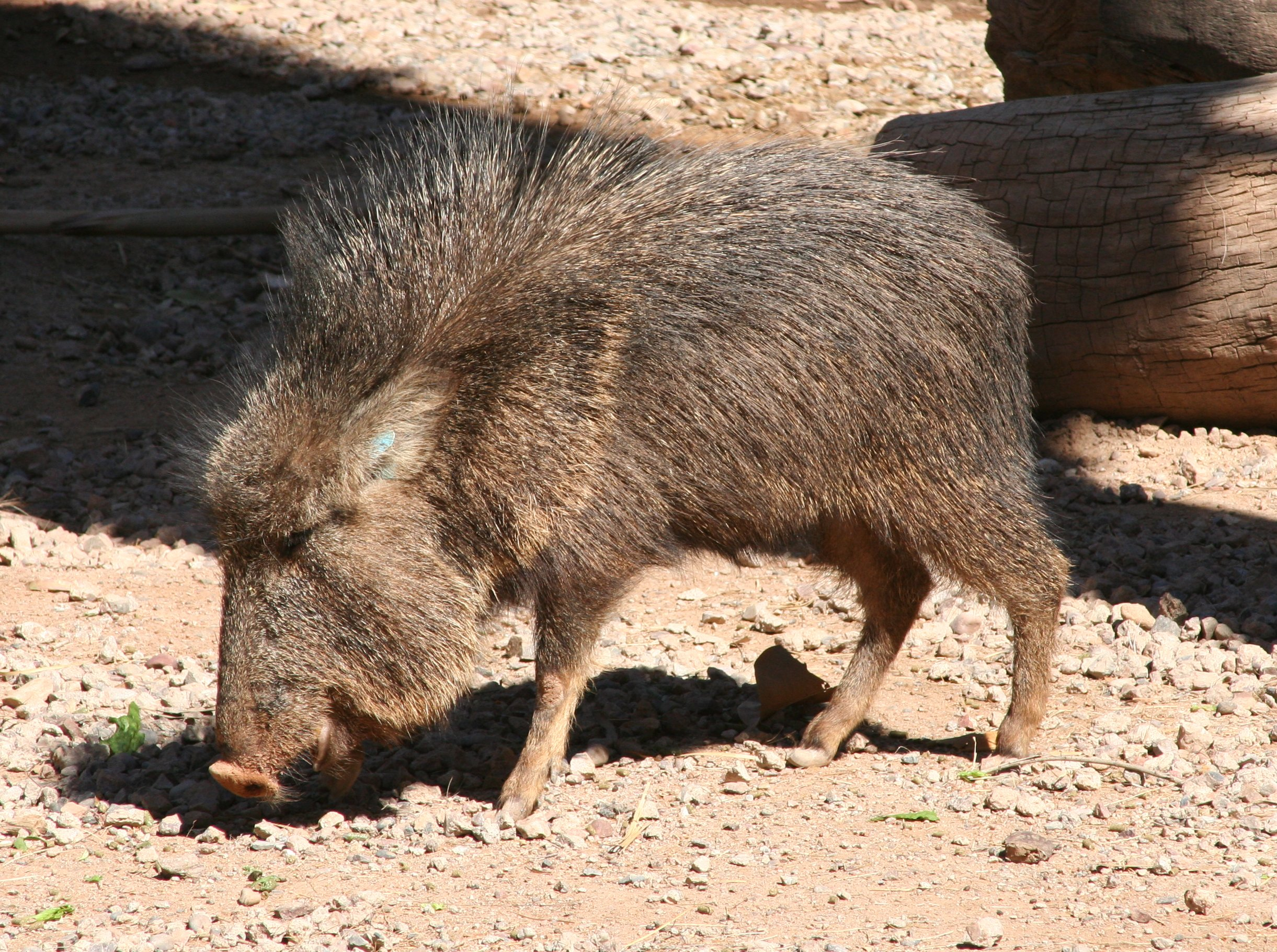
Chacoan peccary

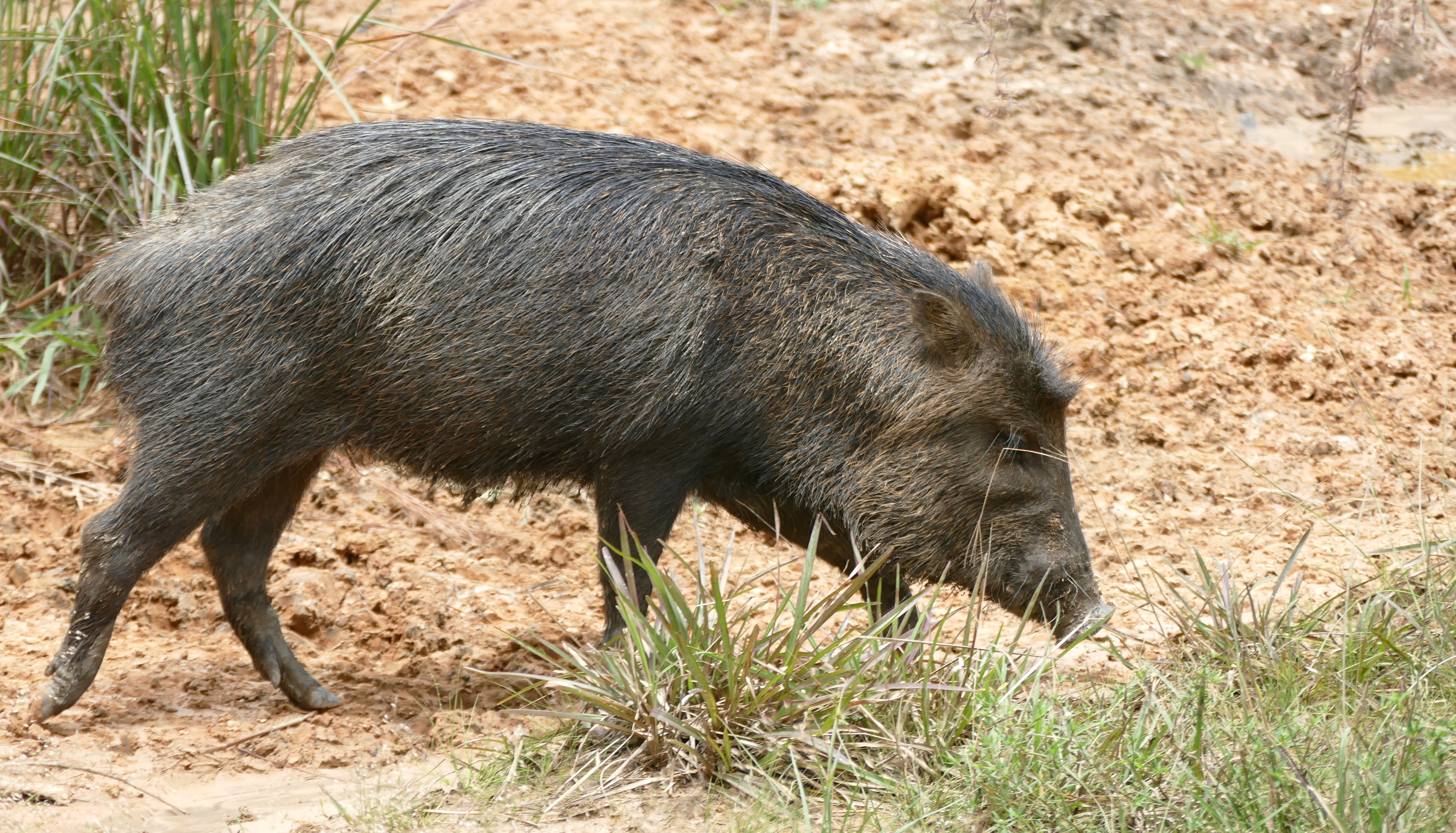
White-lipped peccary

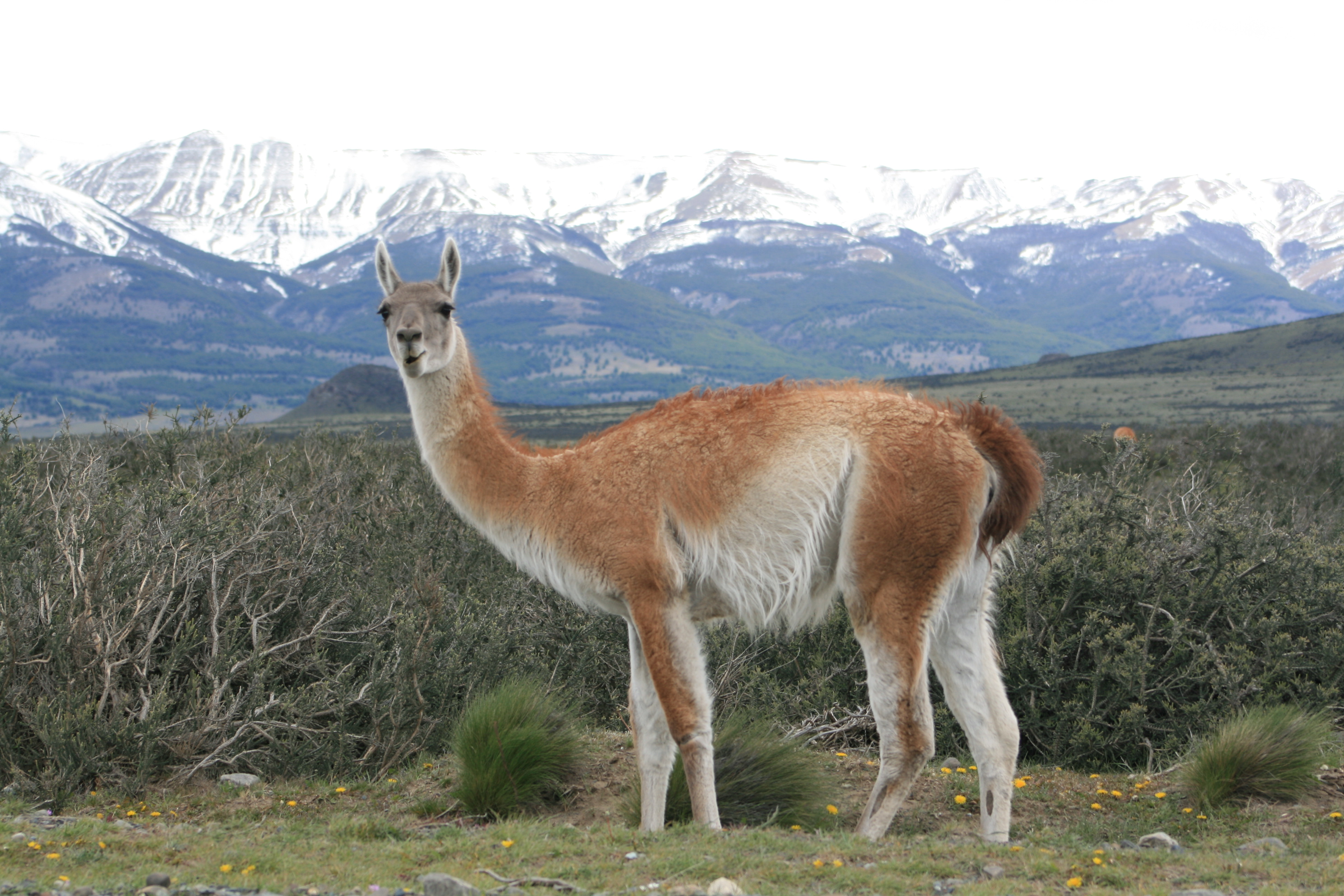
Guanaco

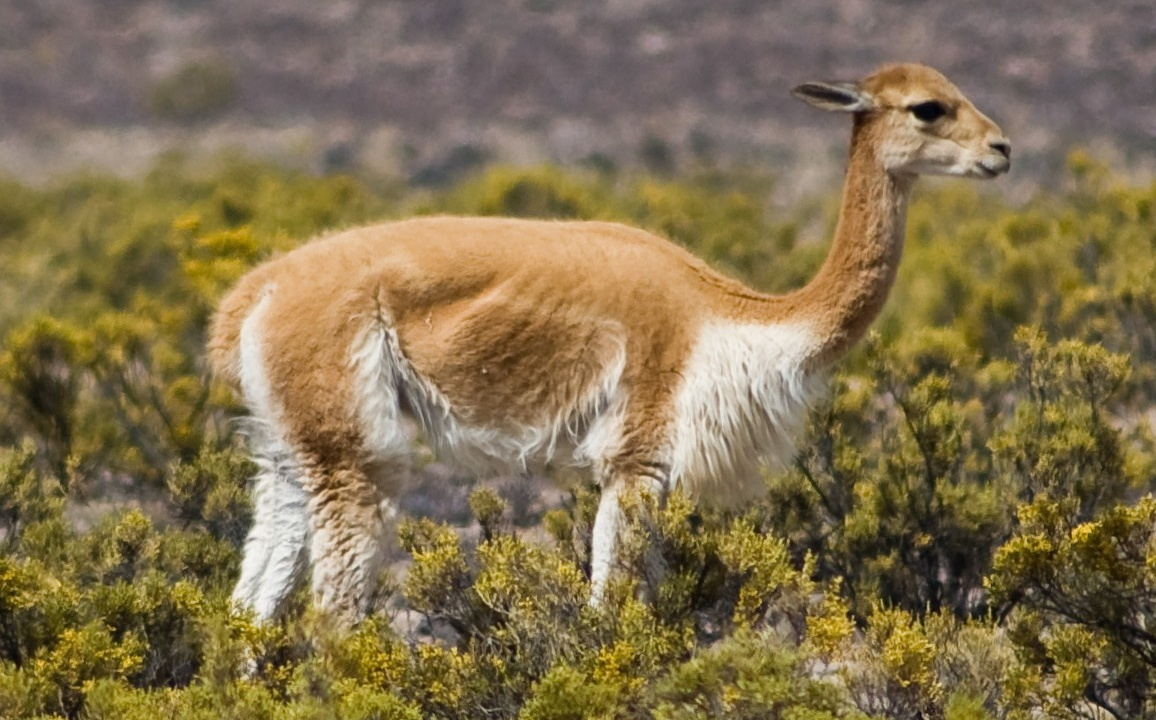
Vicuña

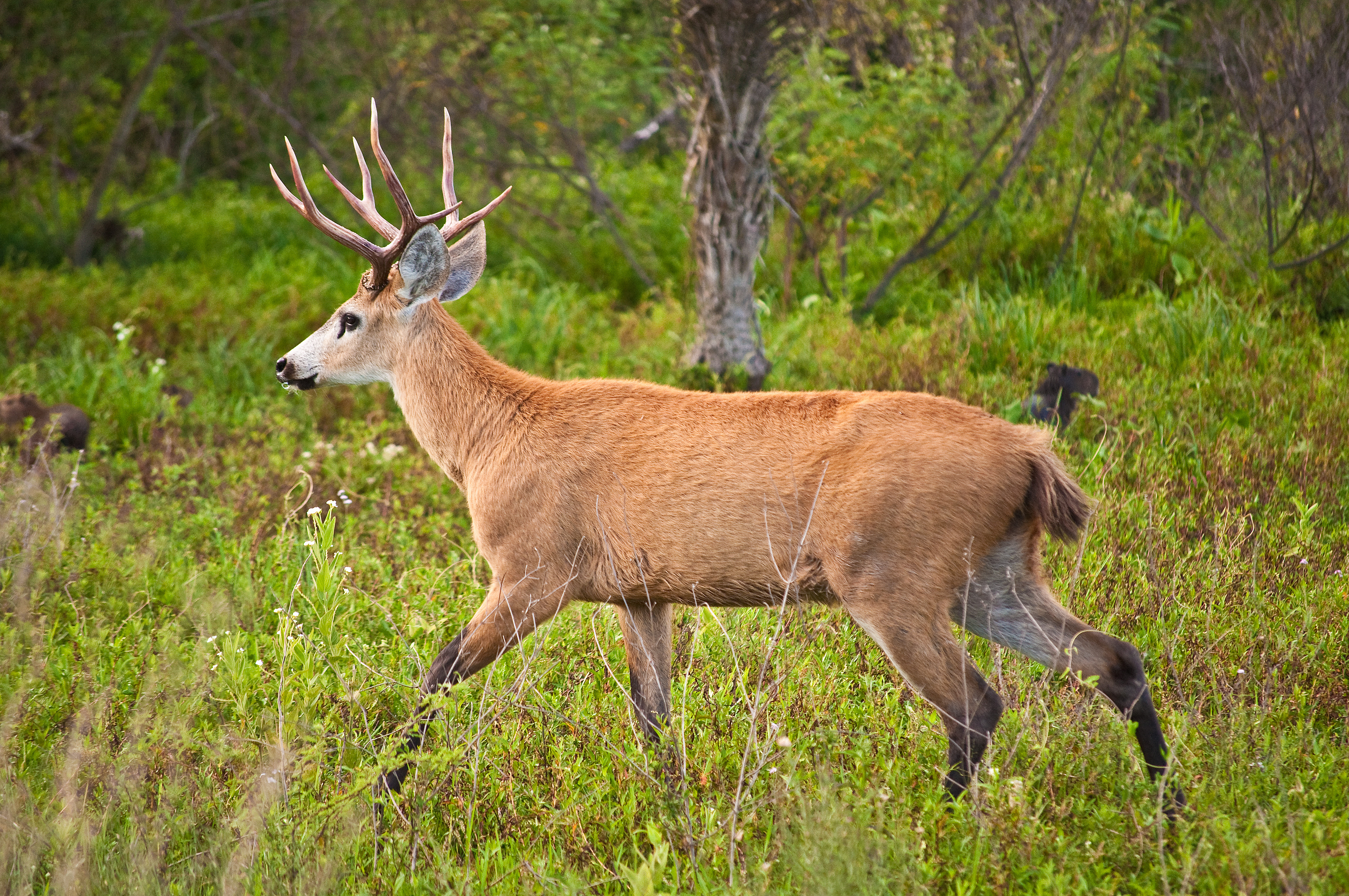
Marsh deer

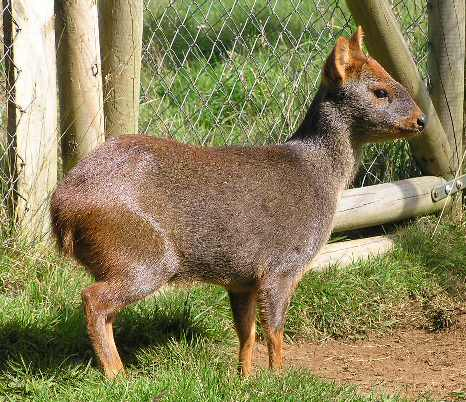
Southern pudú

The weight of even-toed ungulates is borne about equally by the third and fourth toes, rather than mostly or entirely by the third as in perissodactyls. There are about 220 noncetacean artiodactyl species, including many that are of great economic importance to humans. South America's considerable cervid diversity belies their relatively recent arrival. The presence of camelids in South America but not North America today is ironic, given that they have a 45-million-year-long history in the latter continent (where they originated), and only a 3-million-year history in the former.

- Family: Tayassuidae (peccaries)
  - Genus: Catagonus
    - Chacoan peccary, Catagonus wagneri EN
  - Genus: Dicotyles
    - Collared peccary, Dicotyles tajacu LC
  - Genus: Tayassu
    - White-lipped peccary, Tayassu pecari VU
- Family: Camelidae (camels, llamas)
  - Genus: Lama
    - Guanaco, Lama guanicoe LC
    - Vicuña, Lama vicugna LC
- Family: Cervidae (deer)
  - Subfamily: Capreolinae
    - Genus: Blastocerus
      - Marsh deer, Blastocerus dichotomus VU
    - Genus: Hippocamelus
      - Taruca, Hippocamelus antisensis VU
      - South Andean deer, Hippocamelus bisulcus EN
    - Genus: Mazama
      - Red brocket, Mazama americana DD
      - Small red brocket, Mazama bororo VU
      - Merida brocket, Mazama bricenii VU
      - Dwarf brocket, Mazama chunyi VU
      - Gray brocket, Mazama gouazoupira LC
      - Pygmy brocket, Mazama nana VU
      - Amazonian brown brocket, Mazama nemorivaga LC
      - Little red brocket, Mazama rufina VU
      - Central American red brocket, Mazama temama DD
    - Genus: Odocoileus
      - White-tailed deer, Odocoileus virginianus LC
    - Genus: Ozotoceros
      - Pampas deer, Ozotoceros bezoarticus NT
    - Genus: Pudú
      - Northern pudú, Pudu mephistophiles VU
      - Southern pudú, Pudu puda NT
  - Subfamily: Cervinae
    - Genus: Dama
      - European fallow deer, D. dama LC introduced

====== Infraorder: Cetacea (whales, dolphins and porpoises) ======
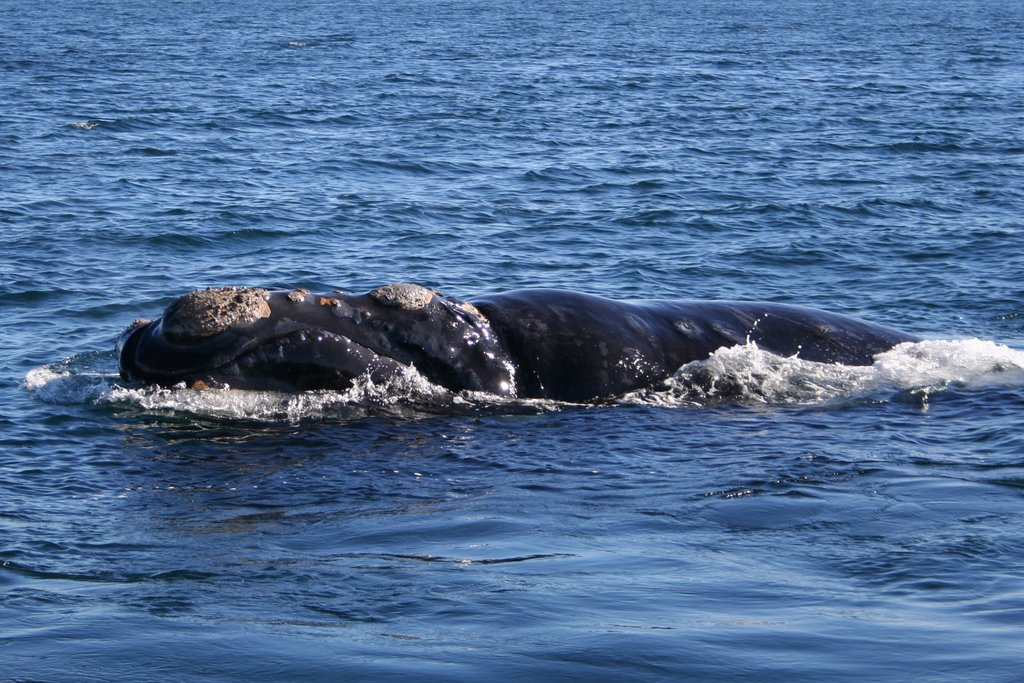
Southern right whale

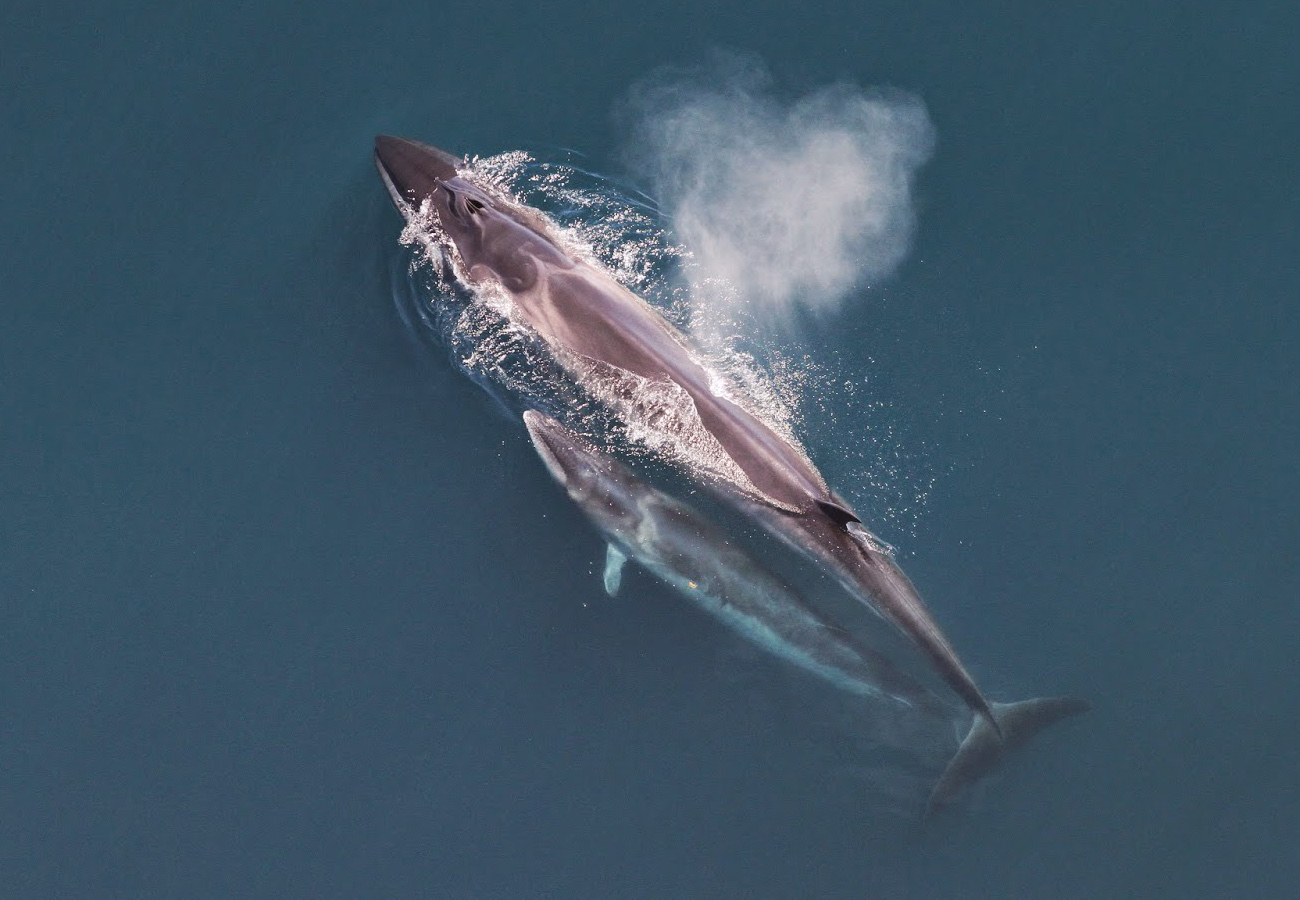
Sei whales

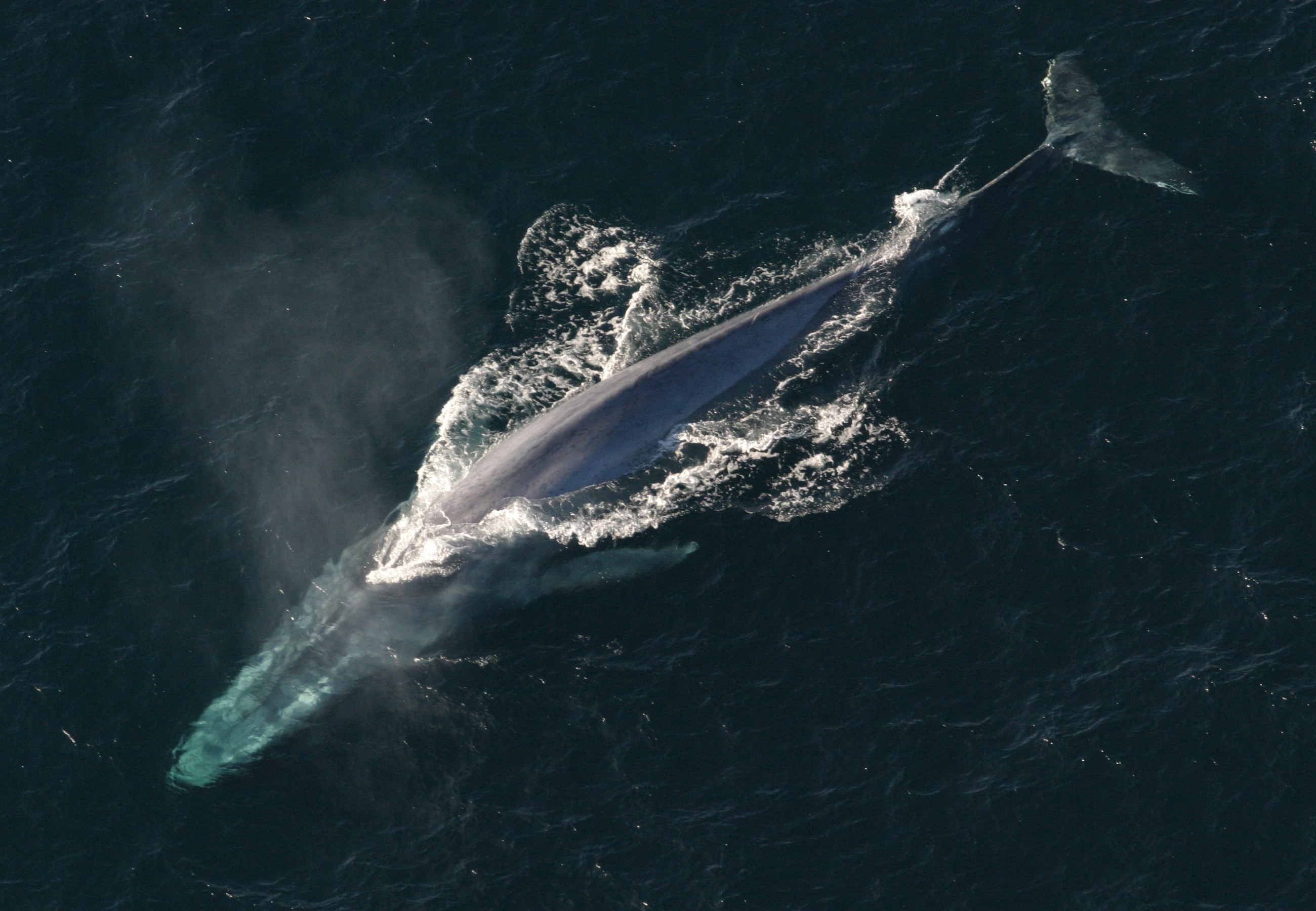
Blue whale

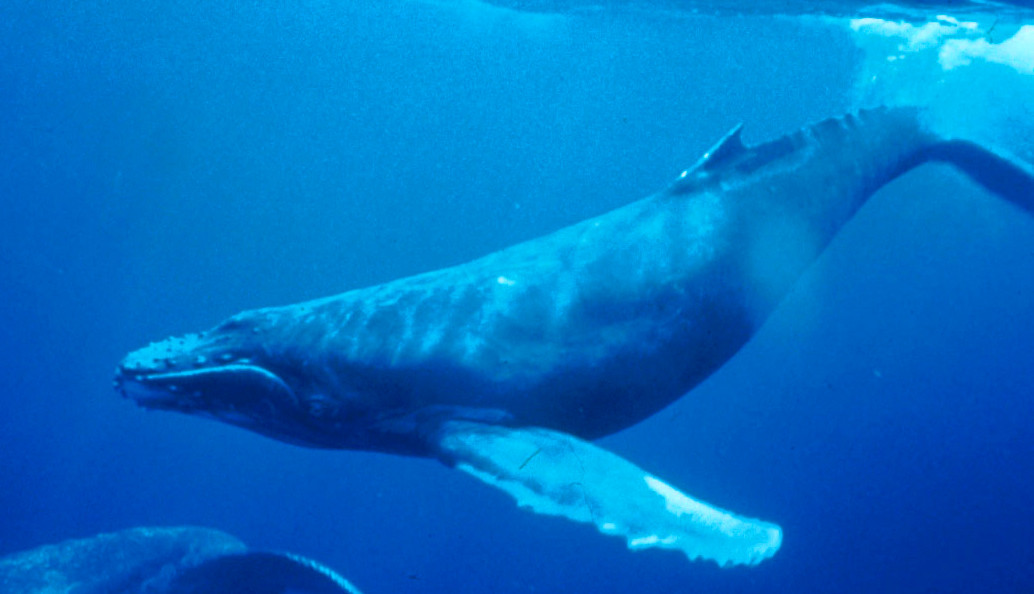
Humpback whale

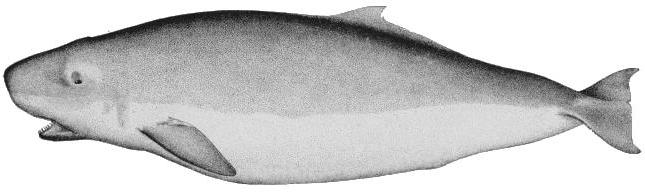
Pygmy sperm whale

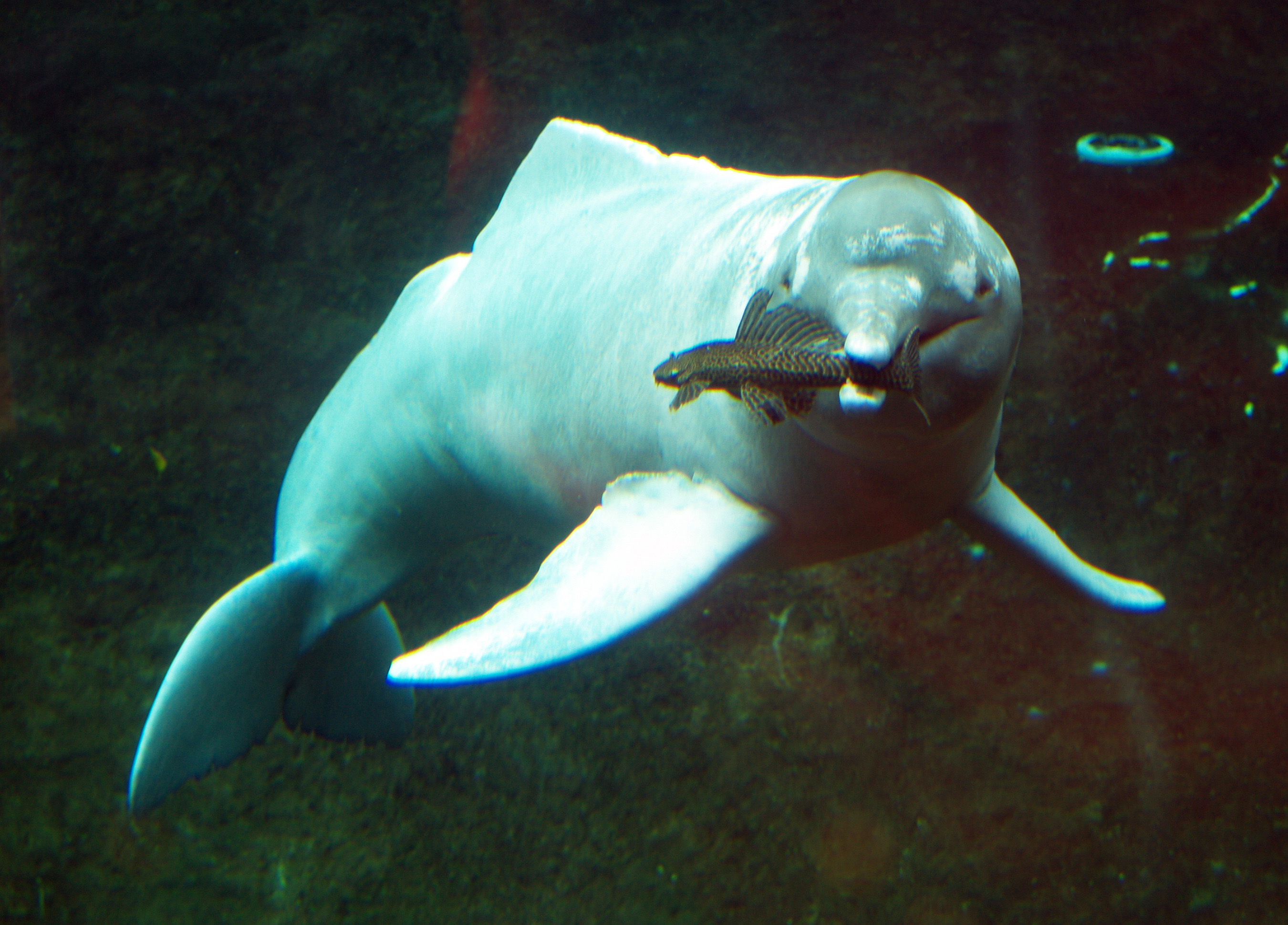
Amazon river dolphin

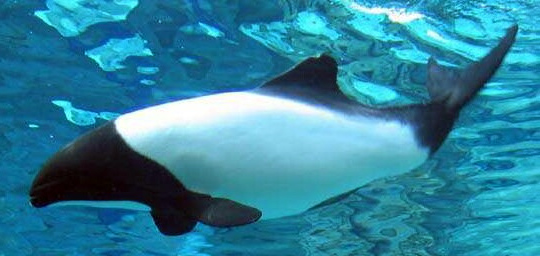
Commerson's dolphin

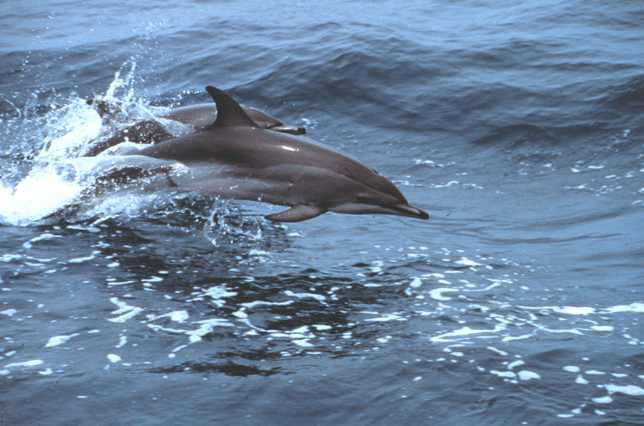
Clymene dolphins

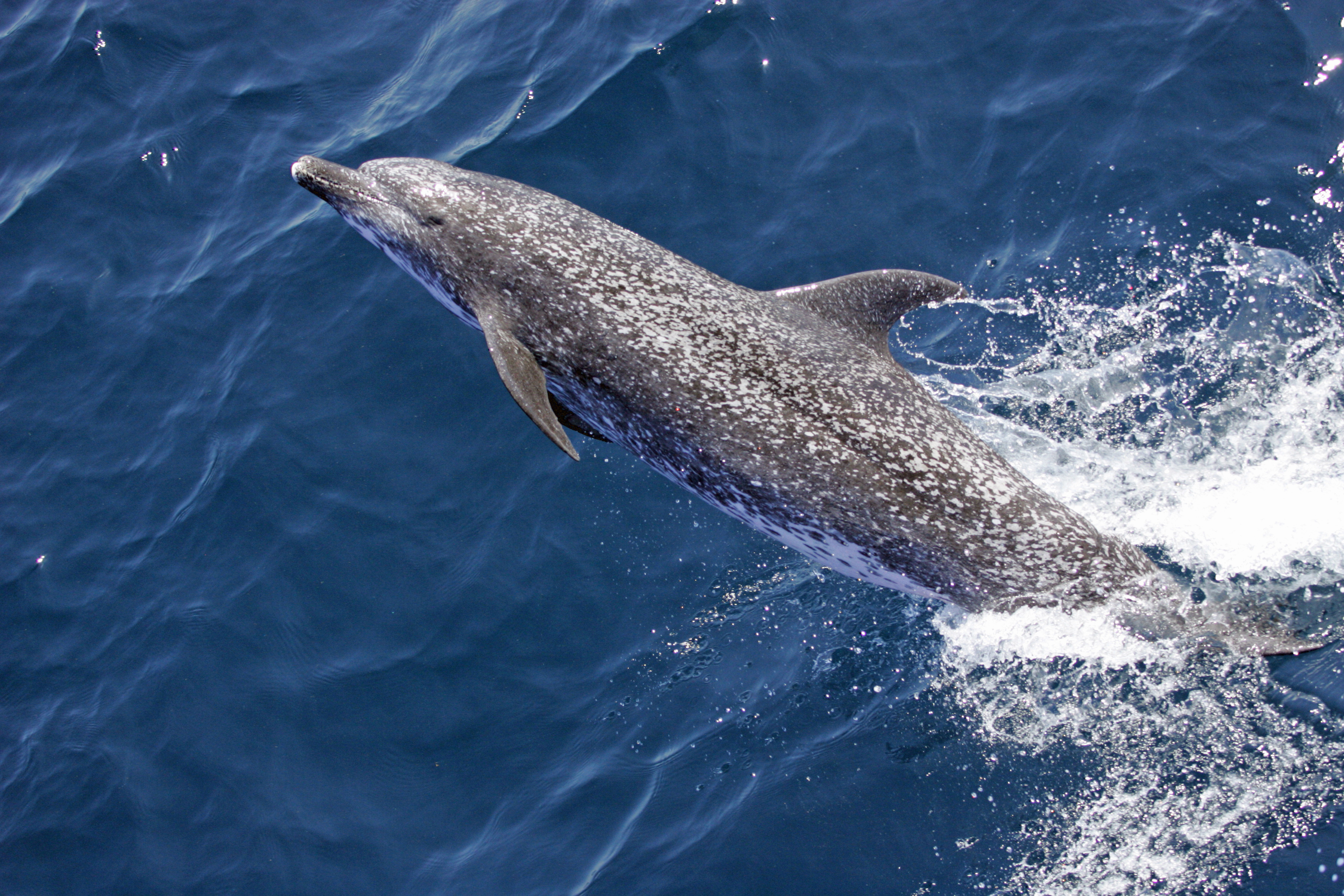
Atlantic spotted dolphin

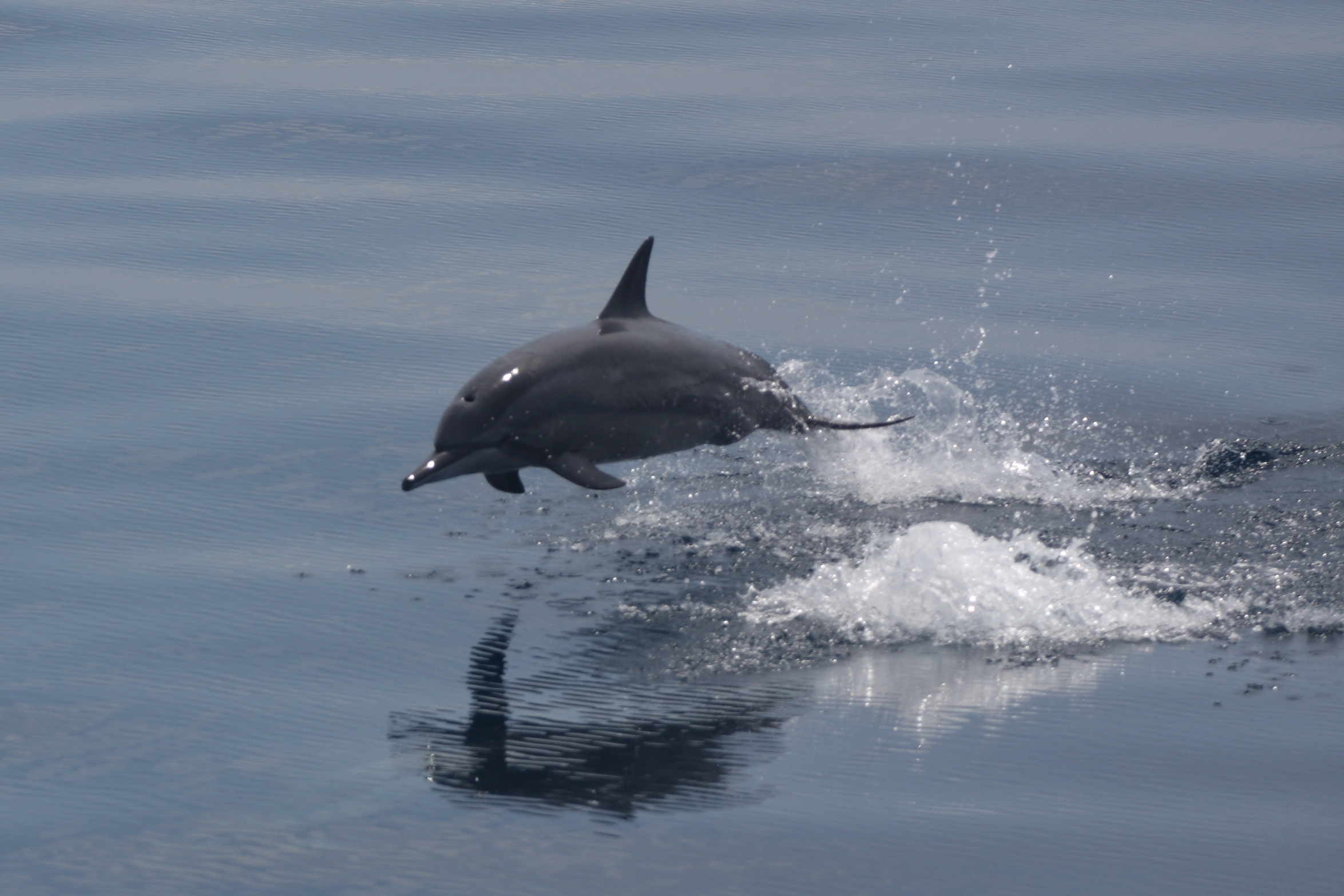
Spinner dolphin

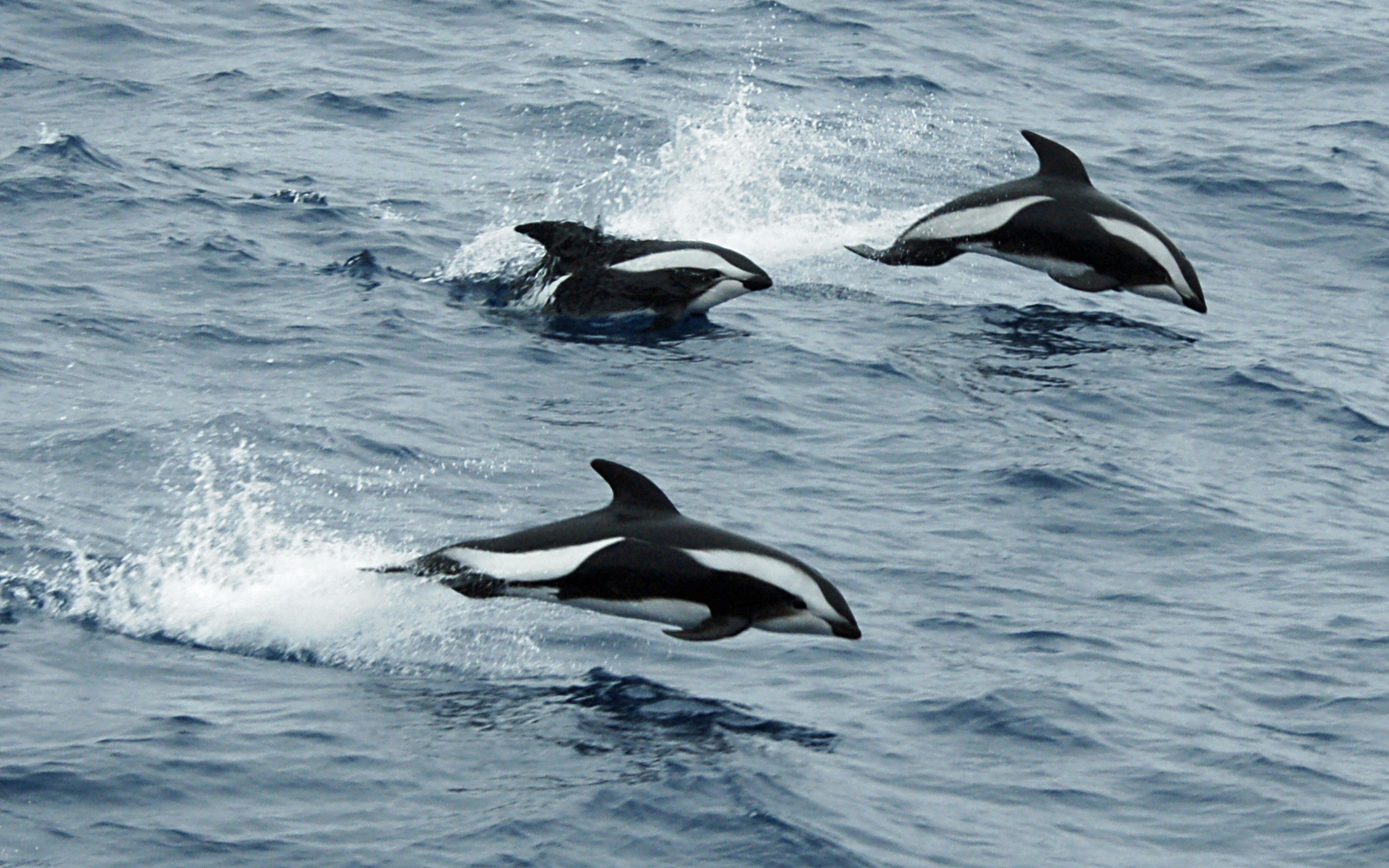
Hourglass dolphins

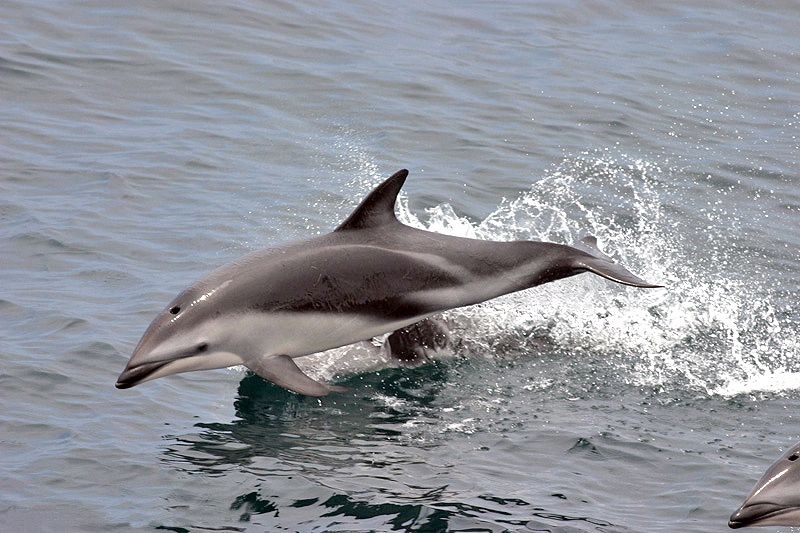
Dusky dolphin

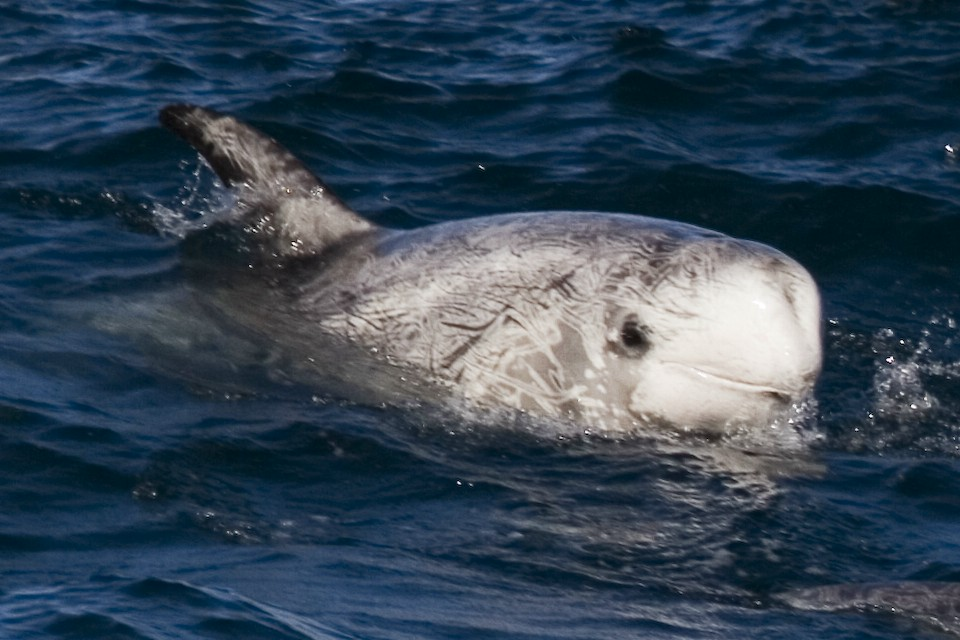
Risso's dolphin

Orcas

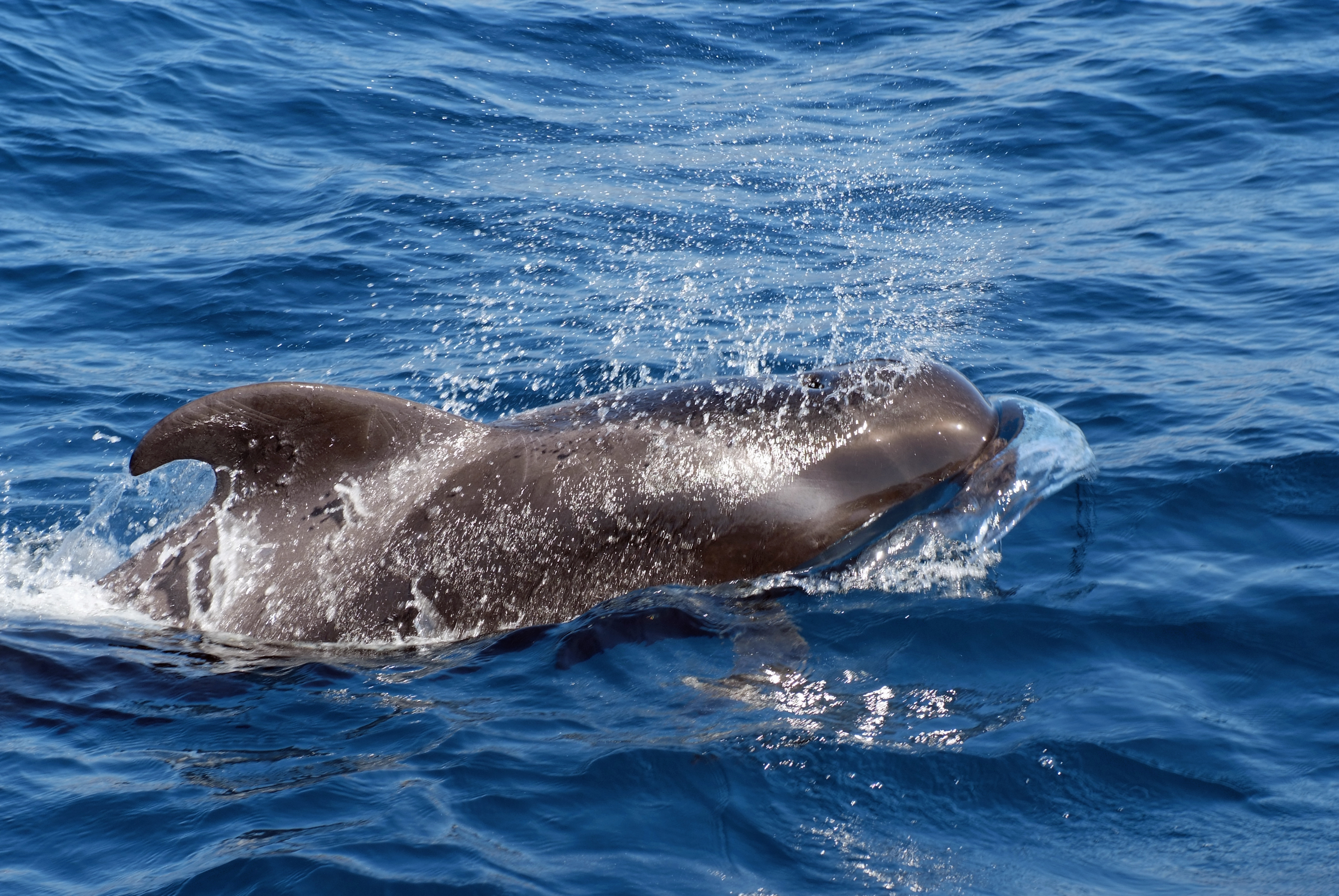
Short-finned pilot whale

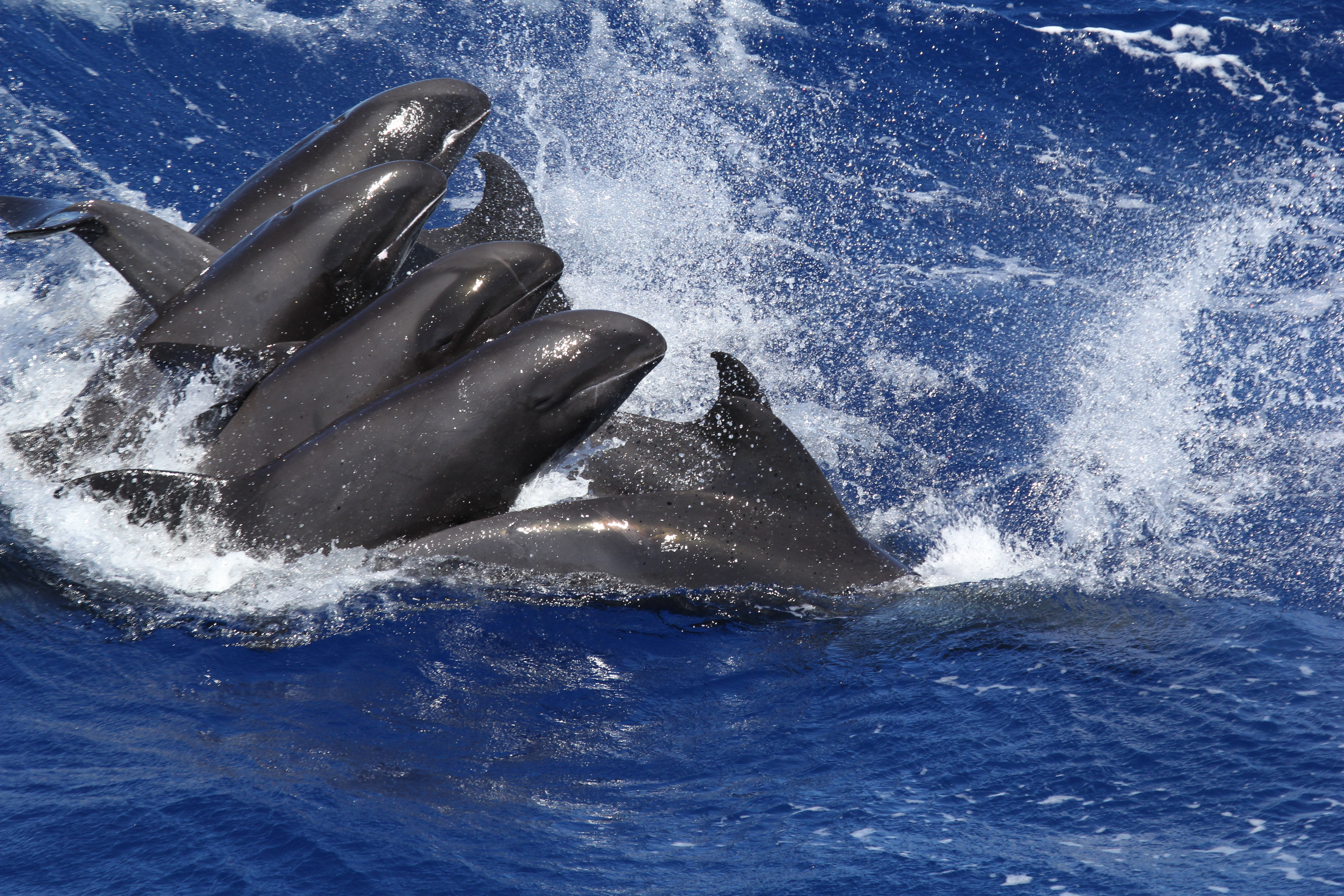
Melon-headed whales

The infraorder Cetacea includes whales, dolphins and porpoises. They are the mammals most fully adapted to aquatic life with a spindle-shaped nearly hairless body, protected by a thick layer of blubber, and forelimbs and tail modified to provide propulsion underwater. Their closest extant relatives are the hippos, which are artiodactyls, from which cetaceans descended; cetaceans are thus also artiodactyls.

- Parvorder: Mysticeti
  - Family: Balaenidae (right whales)
    - Genus: Eubalaena
      - Southern right whale, Eubalaena australis LC
  - Family: Balaenopteridae (rorquals)
    - Subfamily: Balaenopterinae
      - Genus: Balaenoptera
        - Common minke whale, Balaenoptera acutorostrata LC
        - Antarctic minke whale, Balaenoptera bonaerensis NT
        - Sei whale, Balaenoptera borealis EN
        - Bryde's whale, Balaenoptera brydei NE
        - Blue whale, Balaenoptera musculus EN
        - Fin whale, Balaenoptera physalus VU
    - Subfamily: Megapterinae
      - Genus: Megaptera
        - Humpback whale, Megaptera novaeangliae LC
  - Family: Neobalaenidae
    - Genus: Caperea
      - Pygmy right whale, Caperea marginata LC
- Parvorder: Odontoceti
  - Family: Physeteridae (sperm whales)
    - Genus: Physeter
      - Sperm whale, Physeter macrocephalus VU
  - Family: Kogiidae (pygmy, dwarf sperm whales)
    - Genus: Kogia
      - Pygmy sperm whale, Kogia breviceps DD
      - Dwarf sperm whale, Kogia sima DD
  - Family: Ziphidae (beaked whales)
    - Genus: Ziphius
      - Cuvier's beaked whale, Ziphius cavirostris LC
    - Genus: Berardius
      - Arnoux's beaked whale, Berardius arnuxii DD
    - Genus: Tasmacetus
      - Shepherd's beaked whale, Tasmacetus shepherdi DD
    - Subfamily: Hyperoodontinae
      - Genus: Hyperoodon
        - Southern bottlenose whale, Hyperoodon planifrons LC
      - Genus: Mesoplodon
        - Andrews' beaked whale, Mesoplodon bowdoini DD
        - Blainville's beaked whale, Mesoplodon densirostris DD
        - Gervais' beaked whale, Mesoplodon europaeus DD
        - Ginkgo-toothed beaked whale, Mesoplodon ginkgodens DD
        - Gray's beaked whale, Mesoplodon grayi DD
        - Hector's beaked whale, Mesoplodon hectori DD
        - Strap-toothed whale, Mesoplodon layardii DD
        - Pygmy beaked whale, Mesoplodon peruvianus DD
        - Spade-toothed whale, Mesoplodon traversii DD
  - Superfamily: Inioidea (river dolphins)
    - Family: Iniidae
      - Genus: Inia
        - Araguaian river dolphin, Inia araguaiaensis
        - Amazon river dolphin, Inia geoffrensis EN
        - Bolivian river dolphin, Inia geoffrensis boliviensis
    - Family: Pontoporiidae
      - Genus: Pontoporia
        - La Plata dolphin, Pontoporia blainvillei VU
  - Superfamily: Delphinoidea
    - Family: Phocoenidae (porpoises)
      - Genus: Phocoena
        - Spectacled porpoise, Phocoena dioptrica LC
        - Burmeister's porpoise, Phocoena spinipinnis NT
    - Family: Delphinidae (marine dolphins)
      - Genus: Cephalorhynchus
        - Commerson's dolphin, Cephalorhynchus commersonii LC
        - Chilean dolphin, Cephalorhynchus eutropia NT
      - Genus: Steno
        - Rough-toothed dolphin, Steno bredanensis LC
      - Genus: Sotalia
        - Tucuxi, Sotalia fluviatilis DD
        - Guiana dolphin, Sotalia guianensis NT
      - Genus: Tursiops
        - Common bottlenose dolphin, Tursiops truncatus LC
      - Genus: Stenella
        - Pantropical spotted dolphin, Stenella attenuata LC
        - Clymene dolphin, Stenella clymene LC
        - Striped dolphin, Stenella coeruleoalba LC
        - Atlantic spotted dolphin, Stenella frontalis LC
        - Spinner dolphin, Stenella longirostris LC
      - Genus: Delphinus
        - Long-beaked common dolphin, Delphinus capensis DD
        - Short-beaked common dolphin, Delphinus delphis LC
      - Genus: Lagenodelphis
        - Fraser's dolphin, Lagenodelphis hosei LC
      - Genus: Lagenorhynchus
        - Peale's dolphin, Lagenorhynchus australis DD
        - Hourglass dolphin, Lagenorhynchus cruciger LC
        - Dusky dolphin, Lagenorhynchus obscurus DD
      - Genus: Lissodelphis
        - Southern right whale dolphin, Lissodelphis peronii LC
      - Genus: Grampus
        - Risso's dolphin, Grampus griseus LC
      - Genus: Feresa
        - Pygmy killer whale, Feresa attenuata LC
      - Genus: Orcinus
        - Orca, Orcinus orca DD
      - Genus: Pseudorca
        - False killer whale, Pseudorca crassidens NT
      - Genus: Globicephala
        - Short-finned pilot whale, Globicephala macrorhynchus LC
        - Long-finned pilot whale, Globicephala melas LC
      - Genus: Peponocephala
        - Melon-headed whale, Peponocephala electra LC

== Globally extinct ==
The following species are globally extinct:

- Red-bellied gracile opossum, Cryptonanus ignitus EX
- Propraopus sulcatus EX
- Doedicurus clavicaudatus EX
- Glyptodon clavipes
- Hoplophorus euphractus EX
- Eremotherium laurillardi EX
- Megatherium americanum EX
- Glossotherium robustum EX
- Mylodon darwini EX
- Scelidodon chiliensis EX
- Catonyx cuvieri EX
- Scelidotherium leptocephalum EX
- Notiomastodon platensis EX
- Galea tixiensis EX
- Juliomys anoblepas EX
- Ctenomys viarapaensis EX
- Clyomys riograndensis EX
- Candango mouse, Juscelinomys candango EX
- Galápagos giant rat, Megaoryzomys curioi EX
- Darwin's rice rat, Nesoryzomys darwini EX
- Indefatigable Galápagos mouse, Nesoryzomys indefessus EX
- Vespucci's rodent, Noronhomys vespuccii EX
- Giant vampire bat, Desmodus draculae EX
- South American saber-toothed cat, Smilodon populator EX
- Falkland Island wolf, Dusicyon australis EX
- Dusicyon avus EX
- Arctotherium bonariense EX
- Caribbean monk seal, Monachus tropicalis EX
- Toxodon platensis EX
- Xenorhinotherium bahiense EX
- Equus neogeus EX
- Palaeolama major EX

== See also ==
- Invasive species in South America
- List of chordate orders
- Lists of mammals by region
- List of prehistoric mammals
- List of South American animals extinct in the Holocene
- Mammal classification
- List of mammals described in the 2000s
