= List of mammals of Argentina =

This is a list of the native mammal species recorded in Argentina. As of January 2020, the list contains 402 mammal species from Argentina, of which one is extinct, seven are critically endangered, seventeen are endangered, sixteen are vulnerable, and thirty are near threatened. (Note: This list is derived from the IUCN Red List which lists species of mammals and includes those mammals that have recently been classified as extinct (since 1500 AD). The taxonomy and naming of the individual species is based on those used in existing Wikipedia articles as of 21 May 2007 and supplemented by the common names and taxonomy from the IUCN, Smithsonian Institution, or University of Michigan where no Wikipedia article was available. The list was partially updated in February 2020.)

The following tags are used to highlight each species' conservation status as assessed by the International Union for Conservation of Nature; those on the left are used here, those in the second column in some other articles:

| EX | EX | Extinct | No reasonable doubt that the last individual has died. |
| EW | EW | Extinct in the wild | Known only to survive in captivity or as a naturalized population well outside its historic range. |
| CR | CR | Critically endangered | The species is in imminent danger of extinction in the wild. |
| EN | EN | Endangered | The species is facing a very high risk of extinction in the wild. |
| VU | VU | Vulnerable | The species is facing a high risk of extinction in the wild. |
| NT | NT | Near threatened | The species does not qualify as being at high risk of extinction but is likely to do so in the future. |
| LC | LC | Least concern | The species is not currently at risk of extinction in the wild. |
| DD | DD | Data deficient | There is inadequate information to assess the risk of extinction for this species. |
| NE | NE | Not evaluated | The conservation status of the species has not been studied. |

== Subclass: Theria ==
=== Infraclass: Metatheria ===
==== Superorder: Ameridelphia ====
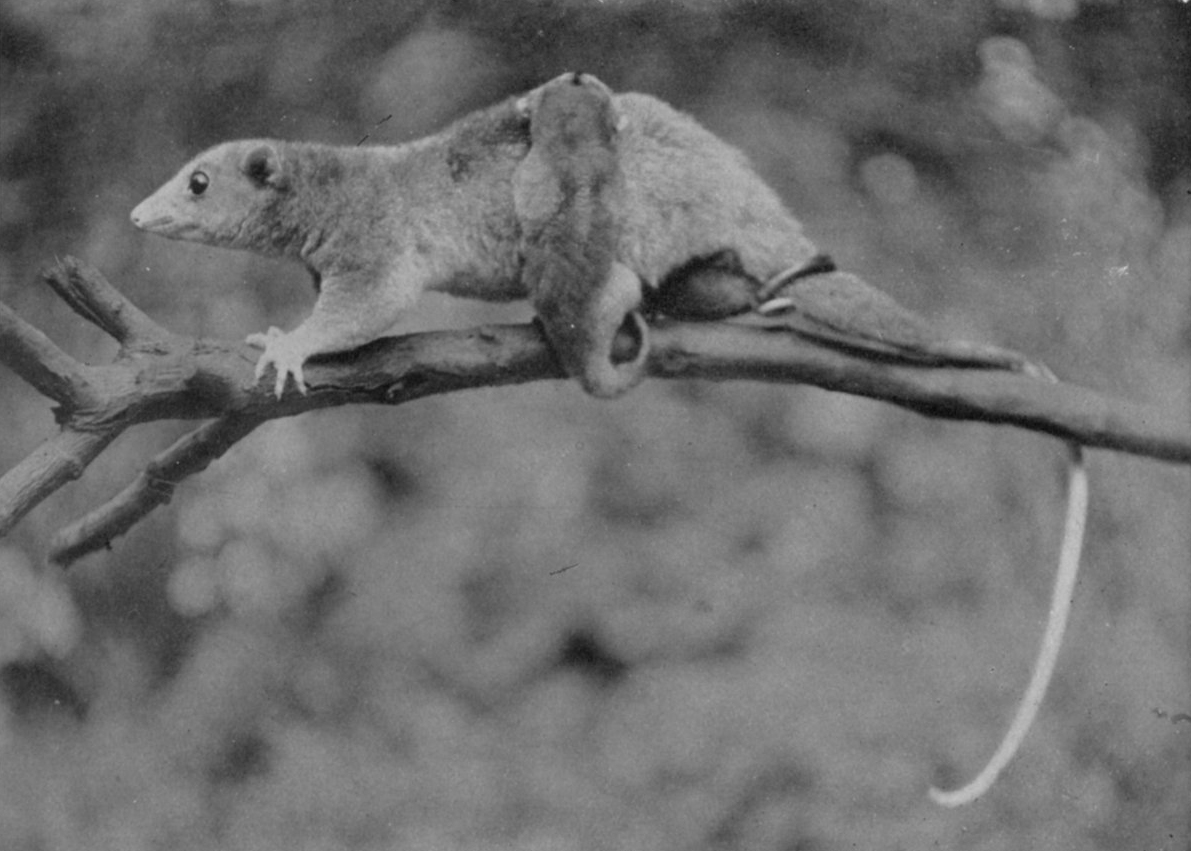
Woolly opossum (Caluromys sp.)

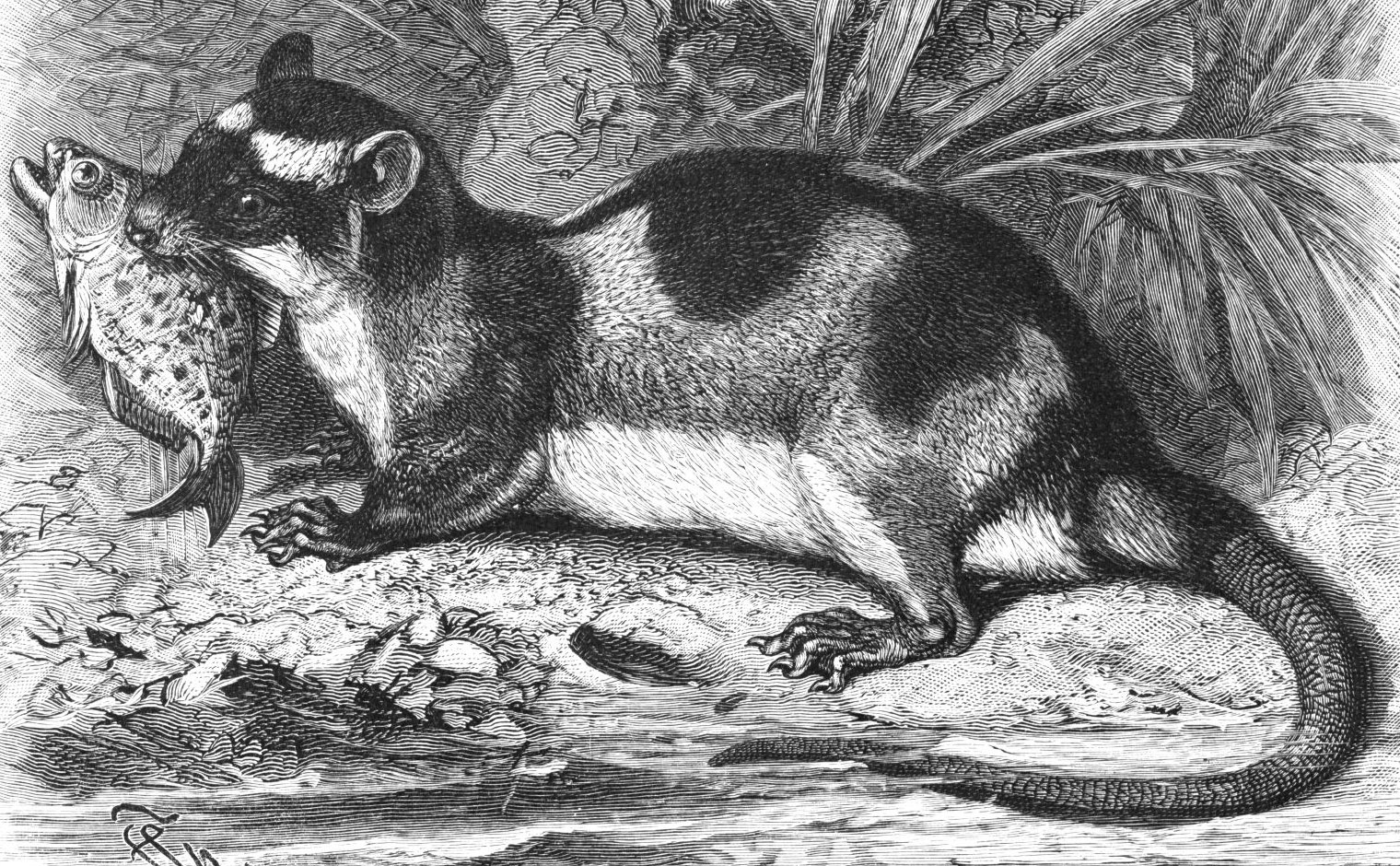
Water opossum

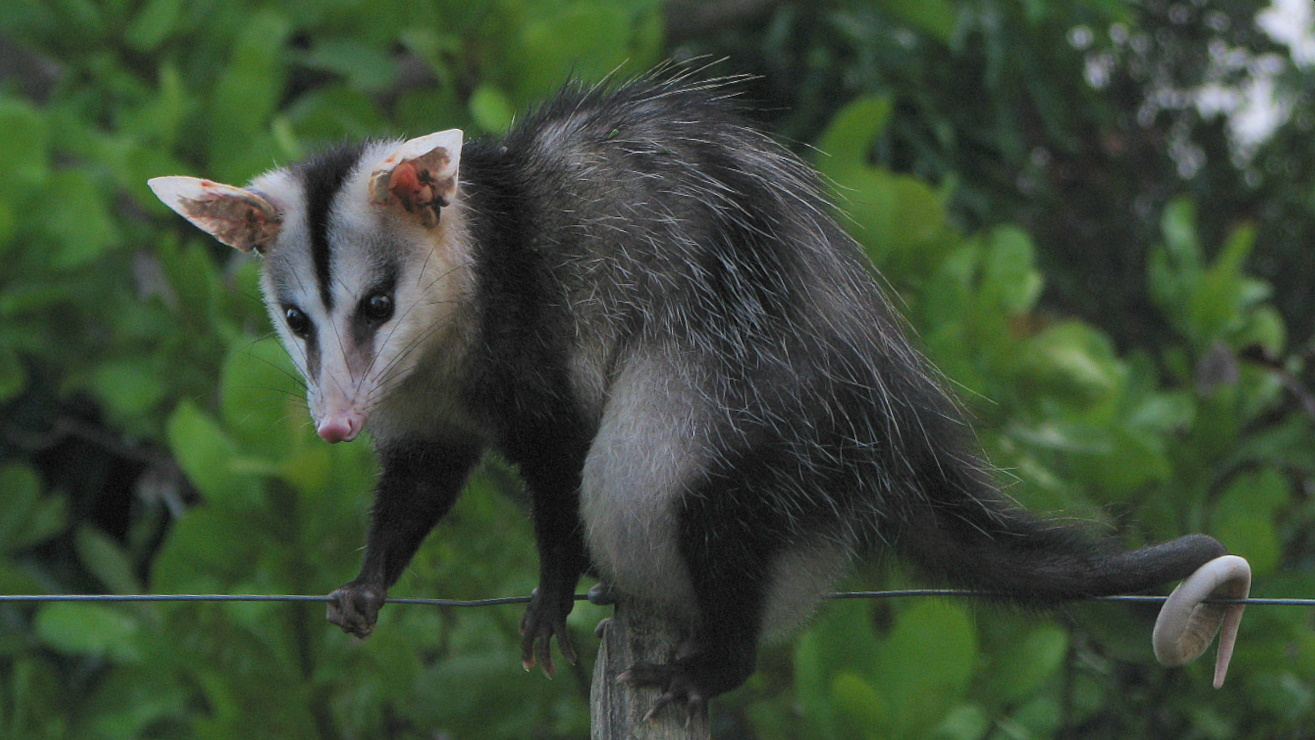
White-eared opossum

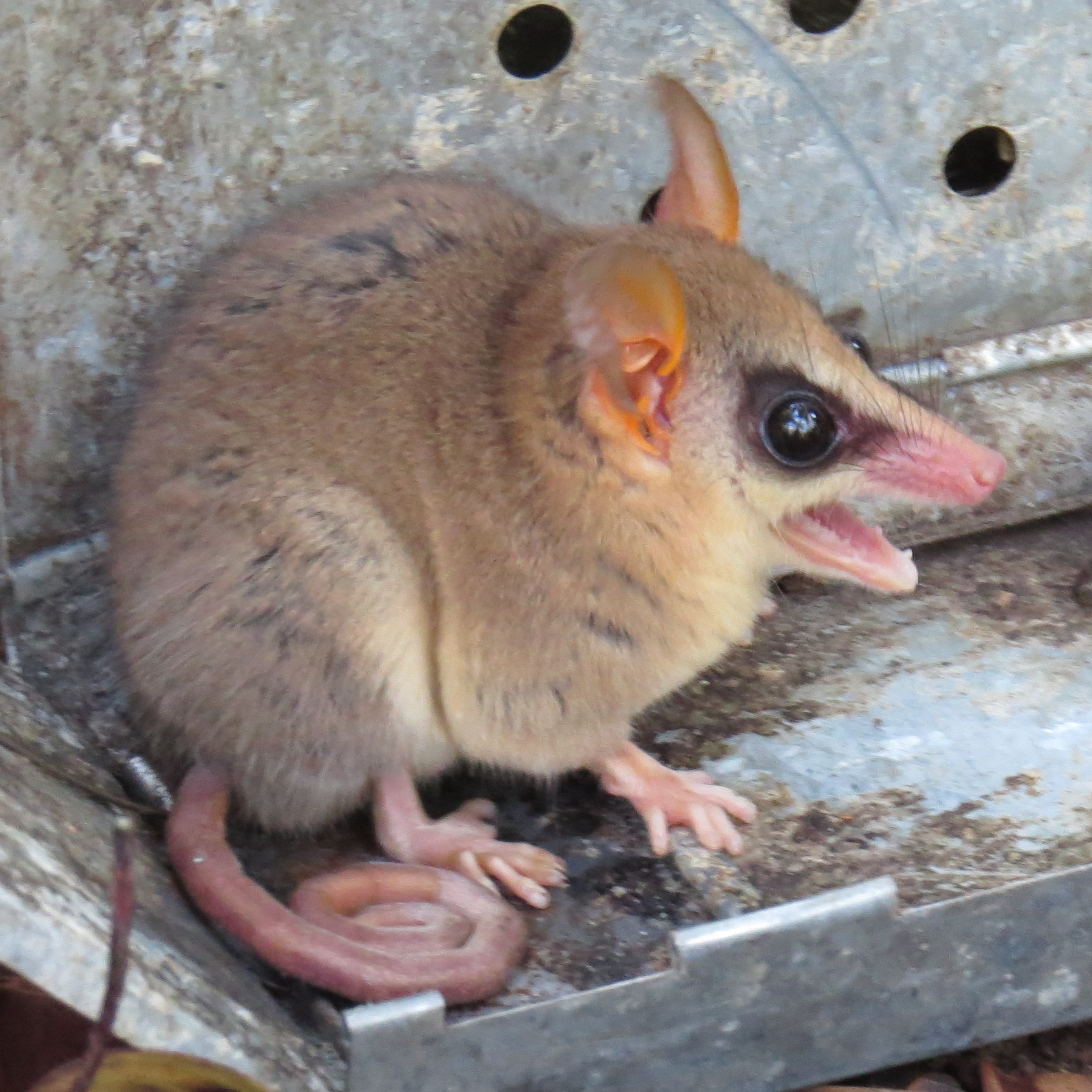
Agile gracile opossum

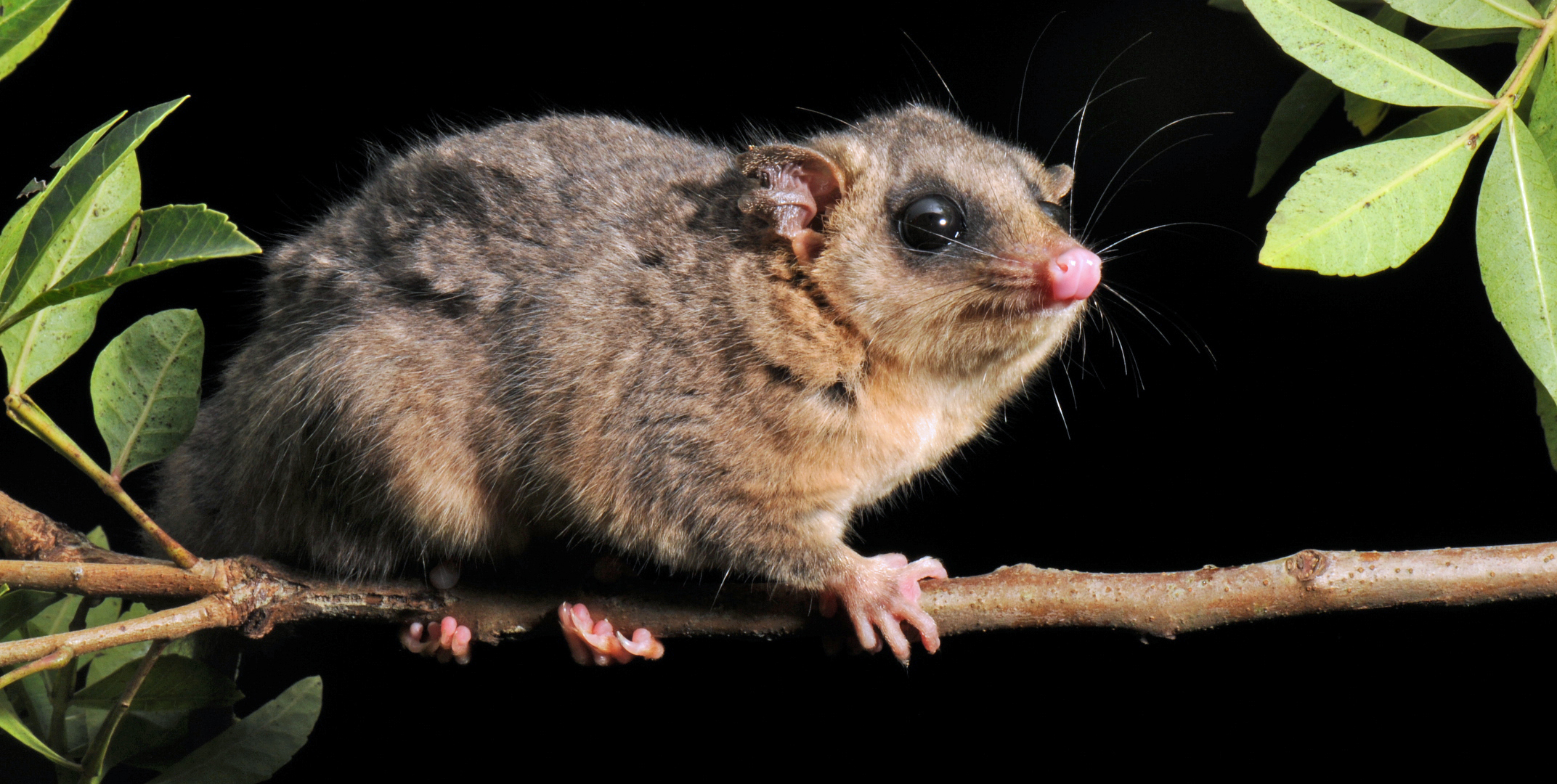
Tate's woolly mouse opossum

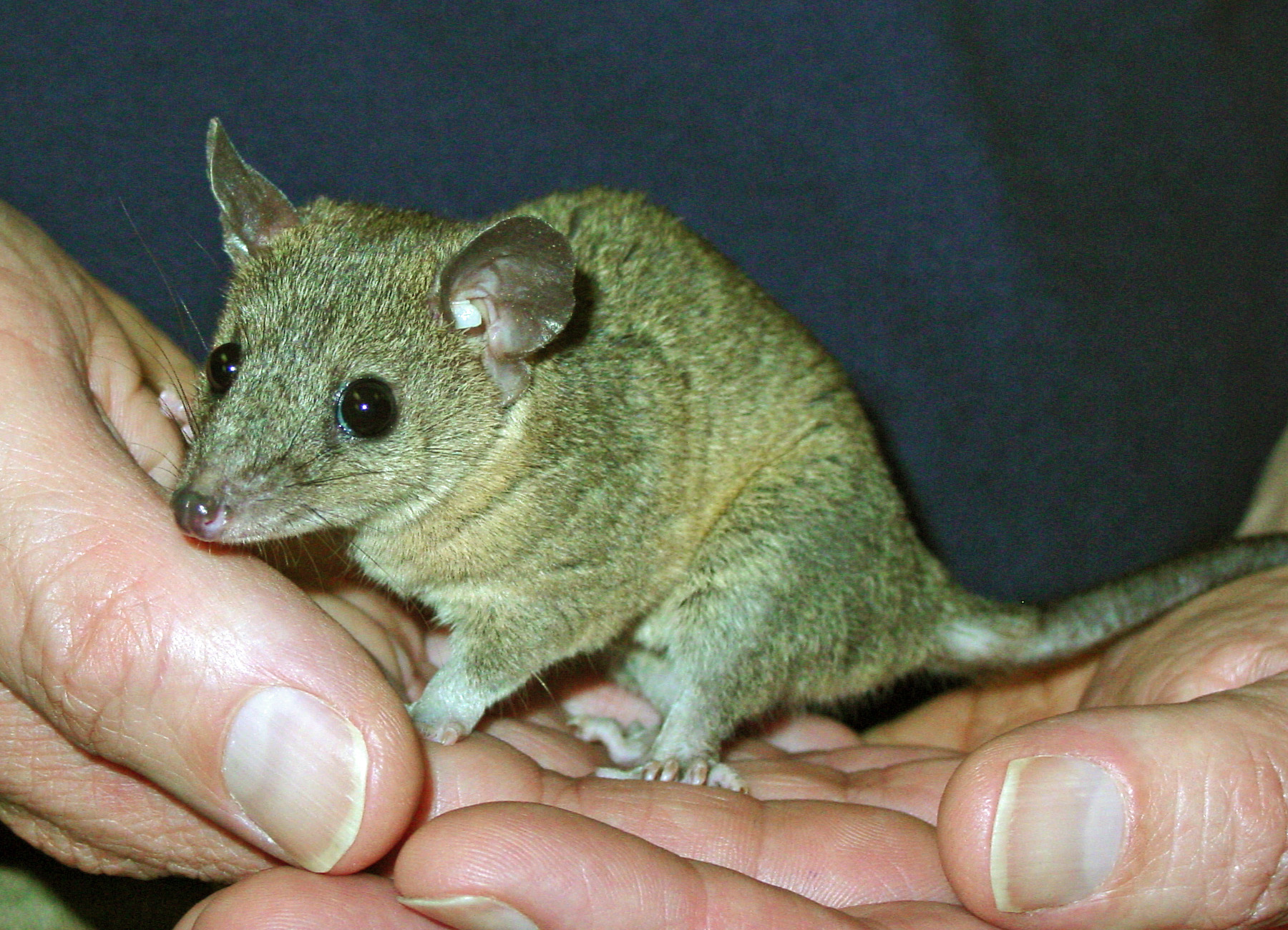
Gray short-tailed opossum

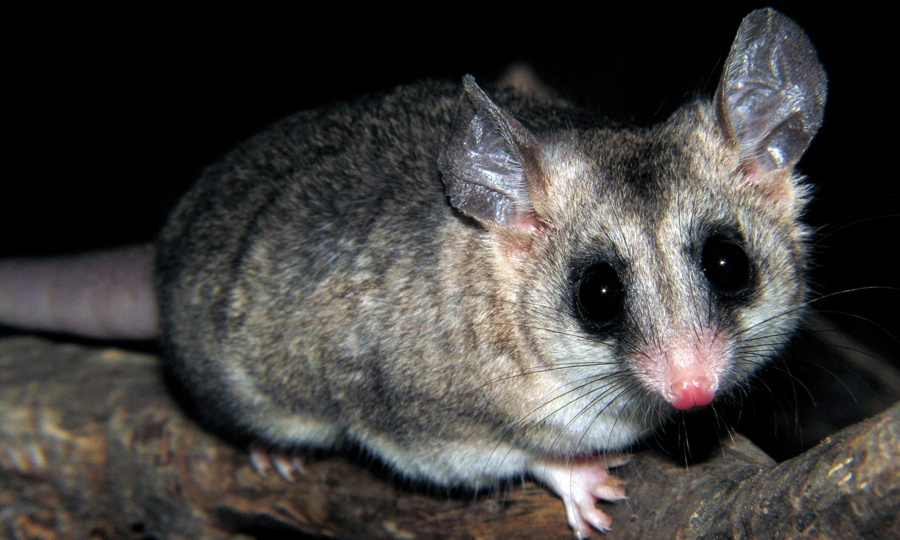
Elegant fat-tailed mouse opossum

===== Order: Didelphimorphia (common opossums) =====
Didelphimorphia is the order of common opossums of the Western Hemisphere. Opossums probably diverged from the basic South American marsupials in the late Cretaceous or early Paleocene. They are small to medium-sized marsupials, about the size of a large house cat, with a long snout and prehensile tail.

- Family: Didelphidae (American opossums)
  - Subfamily: Caluromyinae
    - Genus: Caluromys
      - Brown-eared woolly opossum, C. lanatus LC
  - Subfamily: Didelphinae
    - Genus: Chacodelphys
      - Chacoan pygmy opossum, Chacodelphys formosa NT
    - Genus: Chironectes
      - Water opossum, Chironectes minimus LC
    - Genus: Cryptonanus
      - Chacoan gracile opossum, Cryptonanus chacoensis LC
      - Red-bellied gracile opossum, Cryptonanus ignitus EX
    - Genus: Didelphis
      - White-eared opossum, Didelphis albiventris LC
      - Big-eared opossum, Didelphis aurita LC
    - Genus: Gracilinanus
      - Agile gracile opossum, Gracilinanus agilis LC
      - Brazilian gracile opossum, Gracilinanus microtarsus LC
    - Genus: Lestodelphys
      - Patagonian opossum, Lestodelphys halli LC
    - Genus: Lutreolina
      - Big lutrine opossum, Lutreolina crassicaudata LC
      - Massoia's lutrine opossum, Lutreolina massoia LC
    - Genus: Marmosa
      - Subgenus: Micoureus
        - White-bellied woolly mouse opossum, Marmosa constantiae LC
        - Tate's woolly mouse opossum, Marmosa paraguayana LC
    - Genus: Metachirus
      - Brown four-eyed opossum, Metachirus nudicaudatus LC
    - Genus: Monodelphis
      - Yellow-sided opossum, Monodelphis dimidiata LC
      - Gray short-tailed opossum, Monodelphis domestica LC
      - Pygmy short-tailed opossum, Monodelphis kunsi LC
      - Long-nosed short-tailed opossum, Monodelphis scalops LC
      - Southern red-sided opossum, Monodelphis sorex LC
      - One-striped opossum, Monodelphis unistriata CR
    - Genus: Philander
      - Southeastern four-eyed opossum, Philander frenata LC
    - Genus: Thylamys
      - Cinderella fat-tailed mouse opossum, Thylamys cinderella LC
      - Elegant fat-tailed mouse opossum, Thylamys elegans LC
      - White-bellied fat-tailed mouse opossum, Thylamys pallidior LC
      - Common fat-tailed mouse opossum, Thylamys pusillus LC
      - Argentine fat-tailed mouse opossum, Thylamys sponsorius LC
      - Buff-bellied fat-tailed mouse opossum, Thylamys venustus DD

===== Order: Paucituberculata (shrew opossums) =====
There are six extant species of shrew opossum. They are small shrew-like marsupials confined to the Andes.

- Family: Caenolestidae
  - Genus: Rhyncholestes
    - Long-nosed caenolestid, Rhyncholestes raphanurus NT

==== Superorder: Australidelphia ====
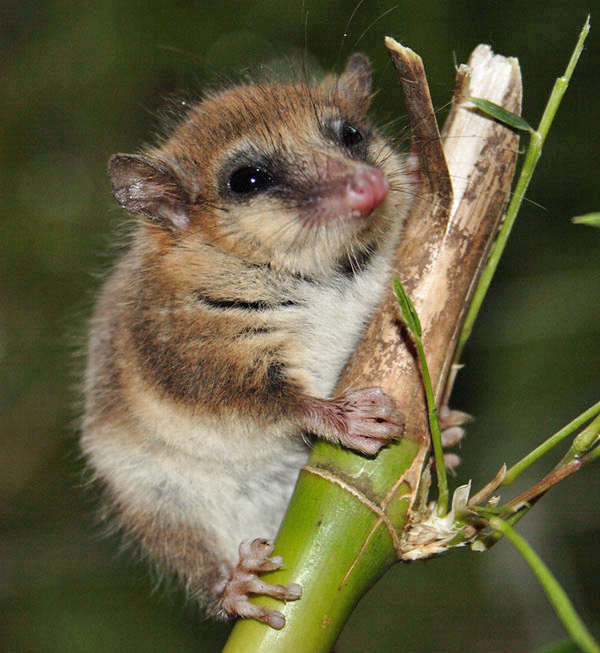
Monito del monte on bamboo

===== Order: Microbiotheria (monito del monte) =====
The monito del monte is the only extant member of its family and the only surviving member of an ancient order, Microbiotheria. It appears to be more closely related to Australian marsupials than to other Neotropic marsupials; this is a reflection of the South American origin of all Australasian marsupials.

- Family: Microbiotheriidae
  - Genus: Dromiciops
    - Monito del monte, D. gliroides NT

=== Infraclass: Eutheria ===
==== Superorder: Xenarthra ====
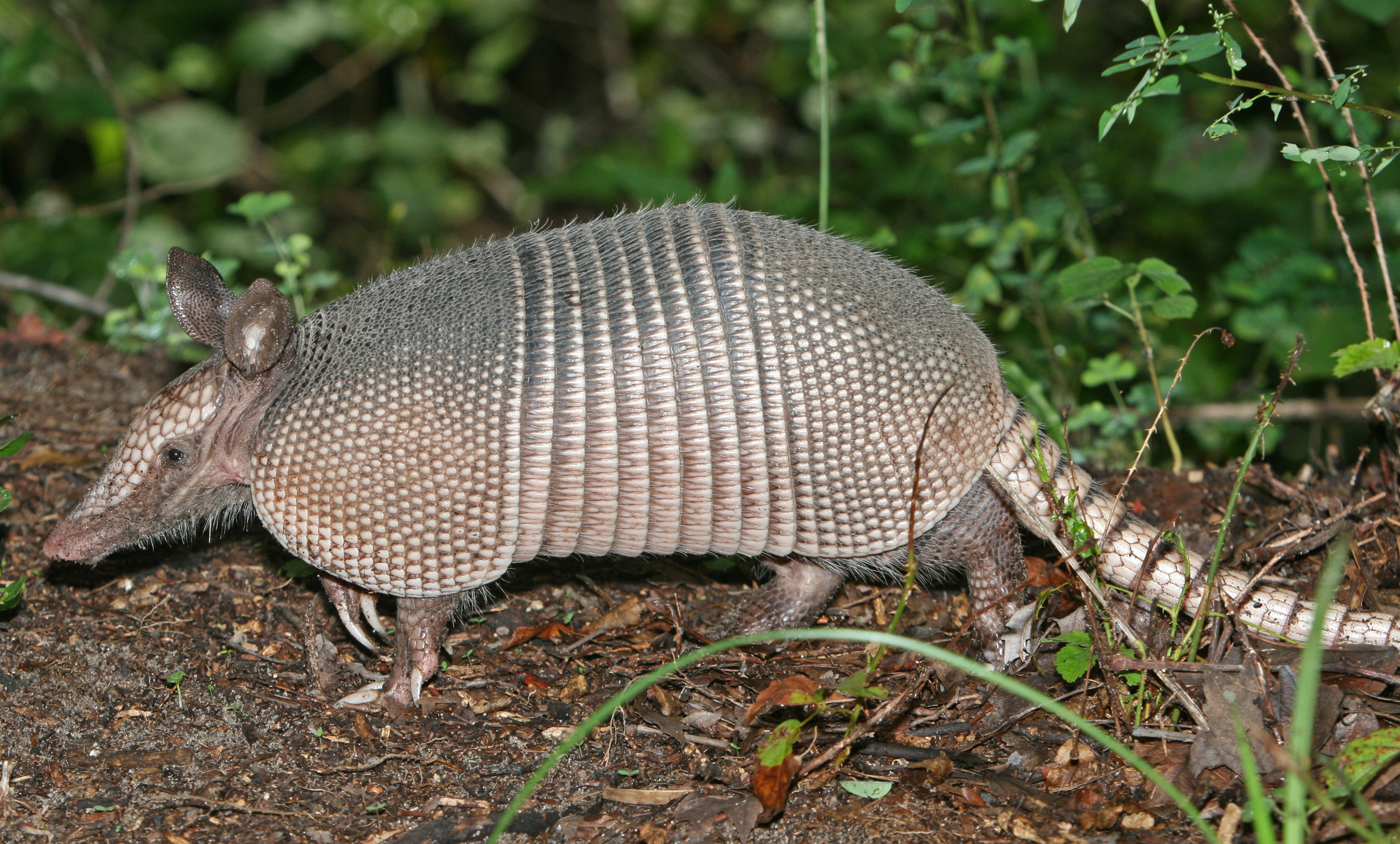
Nine-banded armadillo

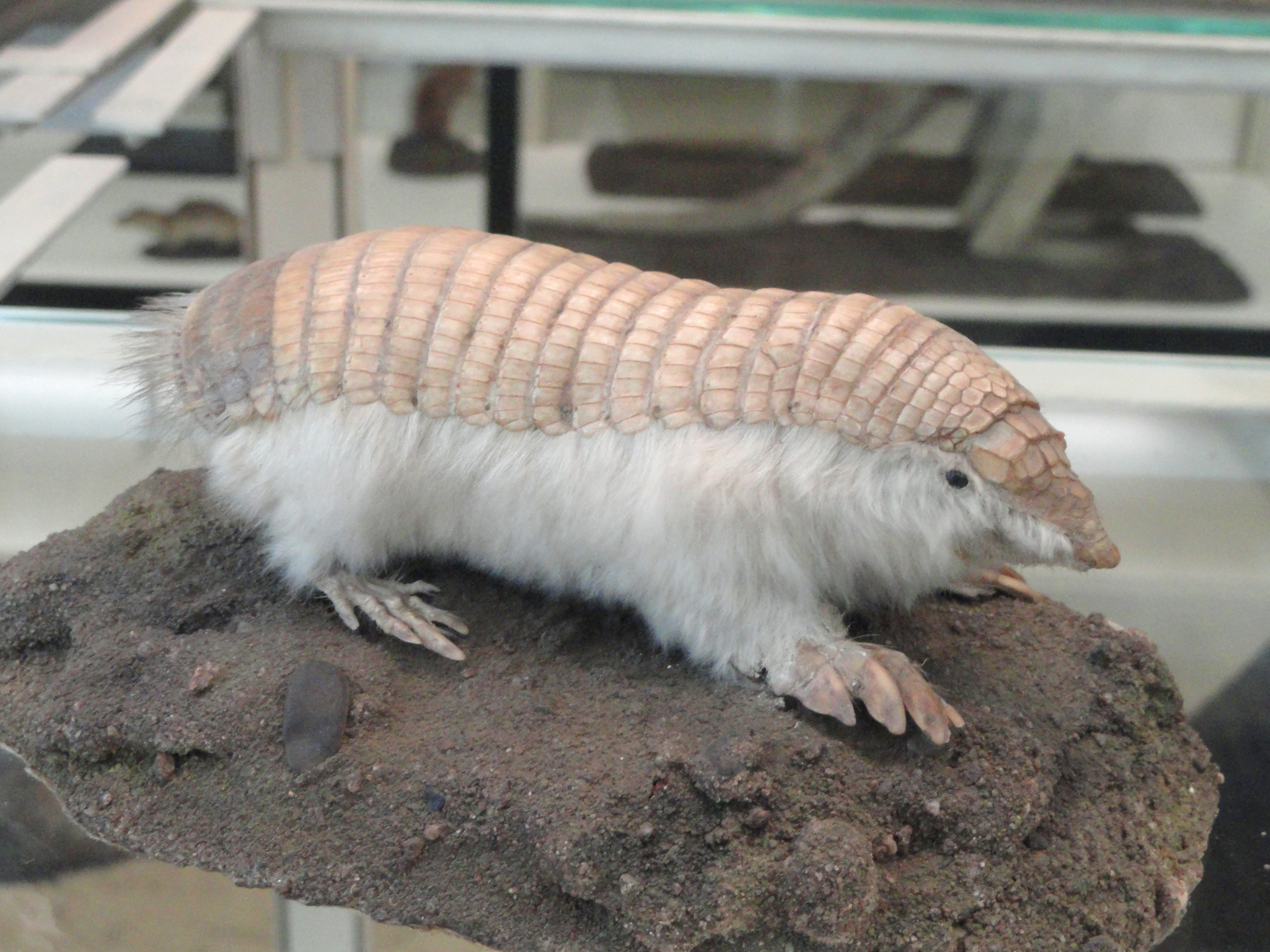
Pink fairy armadillo

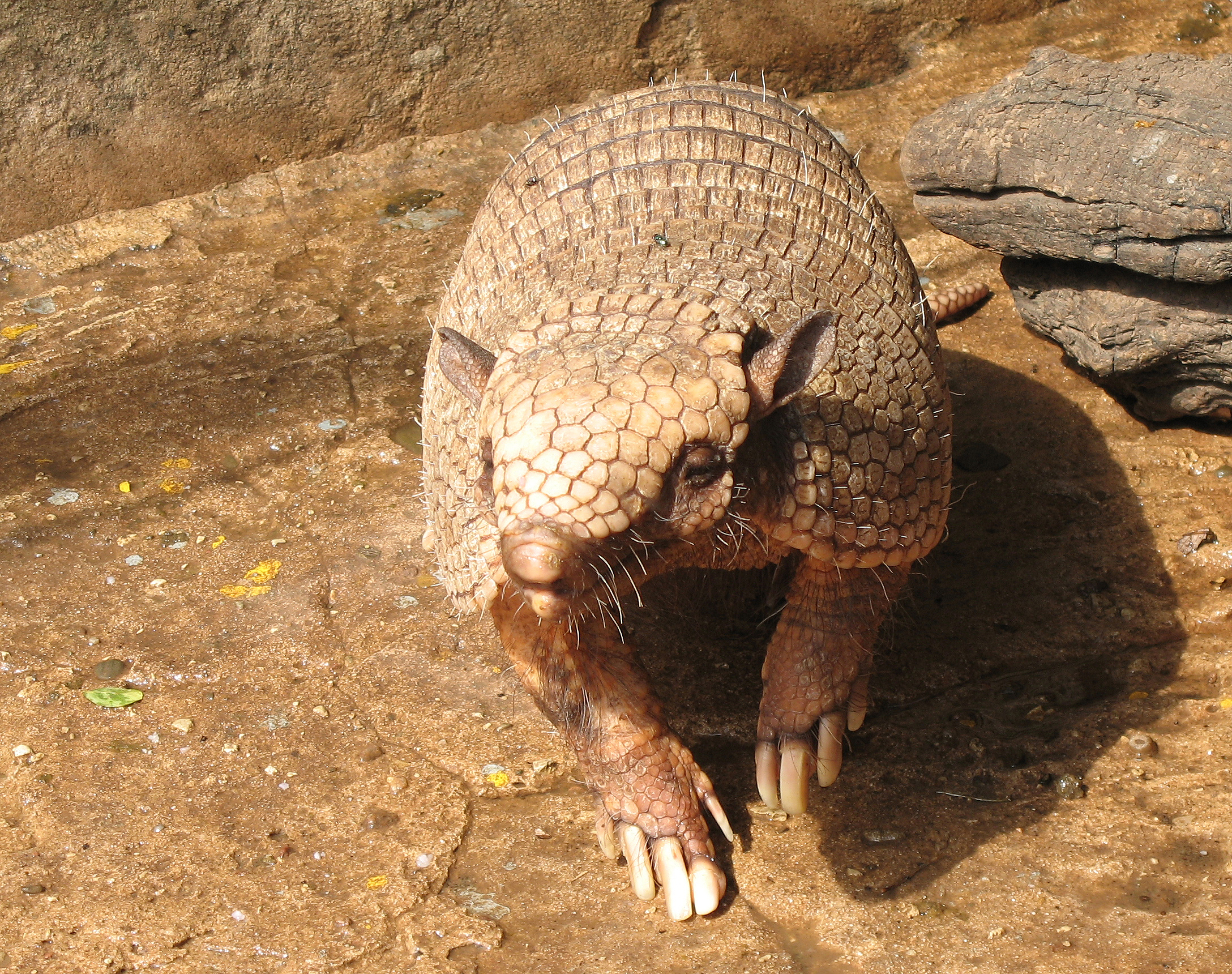
Six-banded armadillo

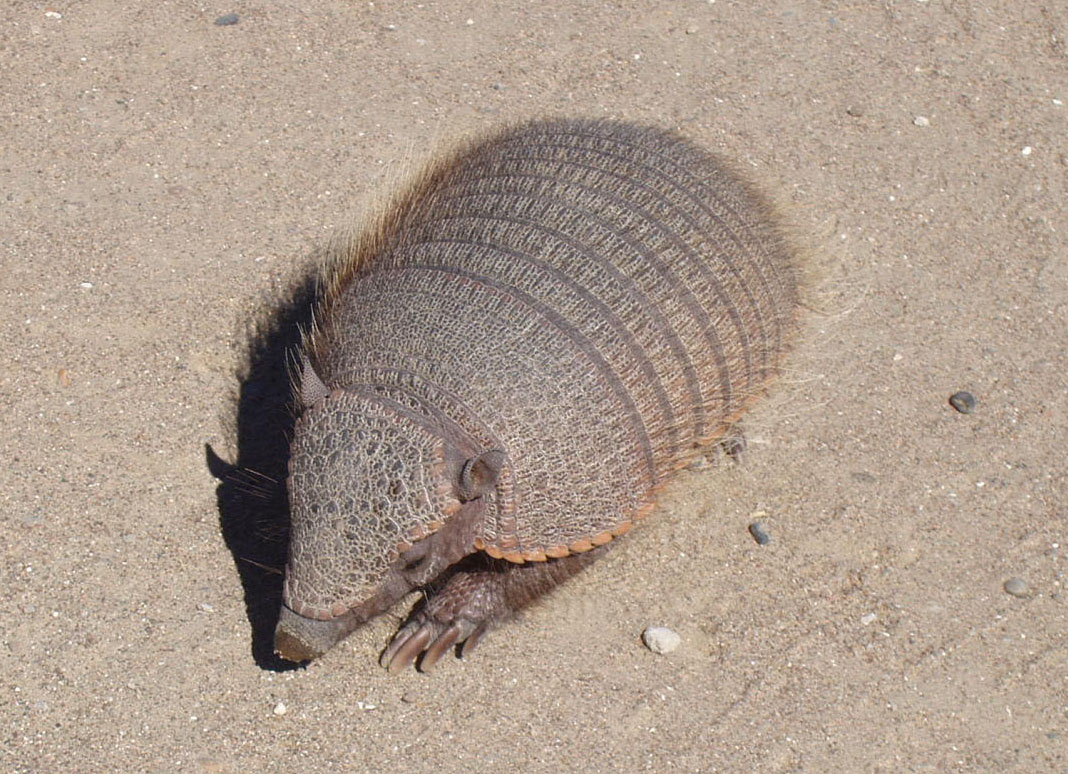
Pichi

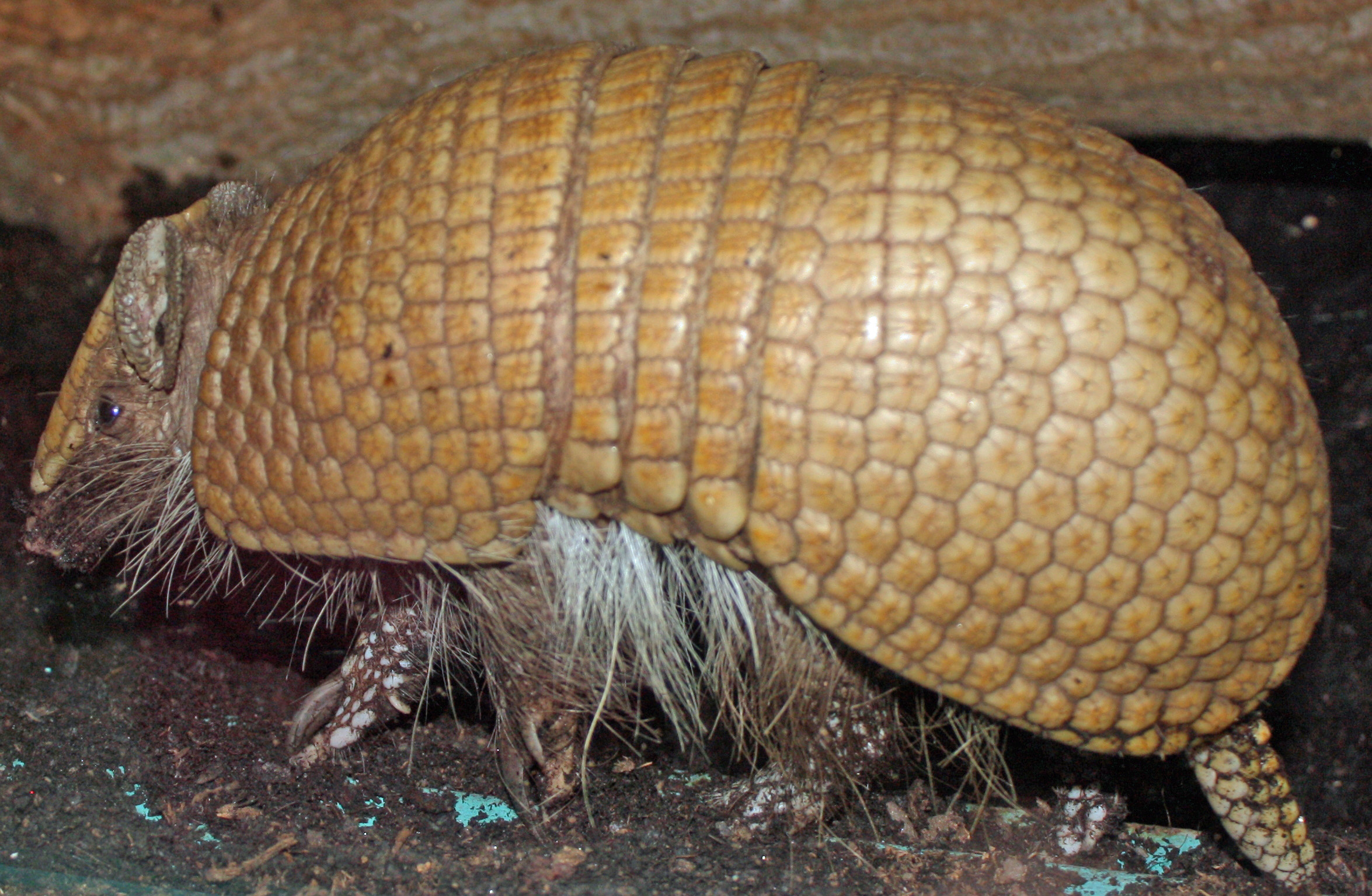
Southern three-banded armadillo

===== Order: Cingulata (armadillos) =====
Armadillos are small mammals with a bony armored shell. There are 21 extant species in the Americas, 19 of which are only found in South America, where they originated. Their much larger relatives, the pampatheres and glyptodonts, once lived in North and South America but became extinct following the appearance of humans.

- Family: Dasypodidae (long-nosed armadillos)
  - Subfamily: Dasypodinae
    - Genus: Dasypus
      - Southern long-nosed armadillo, Dasypus hybridus NT
      - Nine-banded armadillo, Dasypus novemcinctus LC
      - Seven-banded armadillo, Dasypus septemcinctus LC
      - Yepes's mulita, Dasypus yepesi DD
- Family: Chlamyphoridae (armadillos)
  - Subfamily Chlamyphorinae
    - Genus: Calyptophractus
      - Greater fairy armadillo, Calyptophractus retusus DD
    - Genus: Chlamyphorus
      - Pink fairy armadillo, Chlamyphorus truncatus DD
  - Subfamily: Euphractinae
    - Genus: Chaetophractus
      - Andean hairy armadillo, Chaetophractus nationi NE
      - Screaming hairy armadillo, Chaetophractus vellerosus LC
      - Big hairy armadillo, Chaetophractus villosus LC
    - Genus: Euphractus
      - Six-banded armadillo, Euphractus sexcinctus LC
    - Genus: Zaedyus
      - Pichi, Zaedyus pichiy NT
  - Subfamily: Tolypeutinae
    - Genus: Cabassous
      - Chacoan naked-tailed armadillo, Cabassous chacoensis NT
      - Greater naked-tailed armadillo, Cabassous tatouay LC
    - Genus: Priodontes
      - Giant armadillo, Priodontes maximus VU
    - Genus: Tolypeutes
      - Southern three-banded armadillo, Tolypeutes matacus NT

===== Order: Pilosa (anteaters, sloths and tamanduas) =====
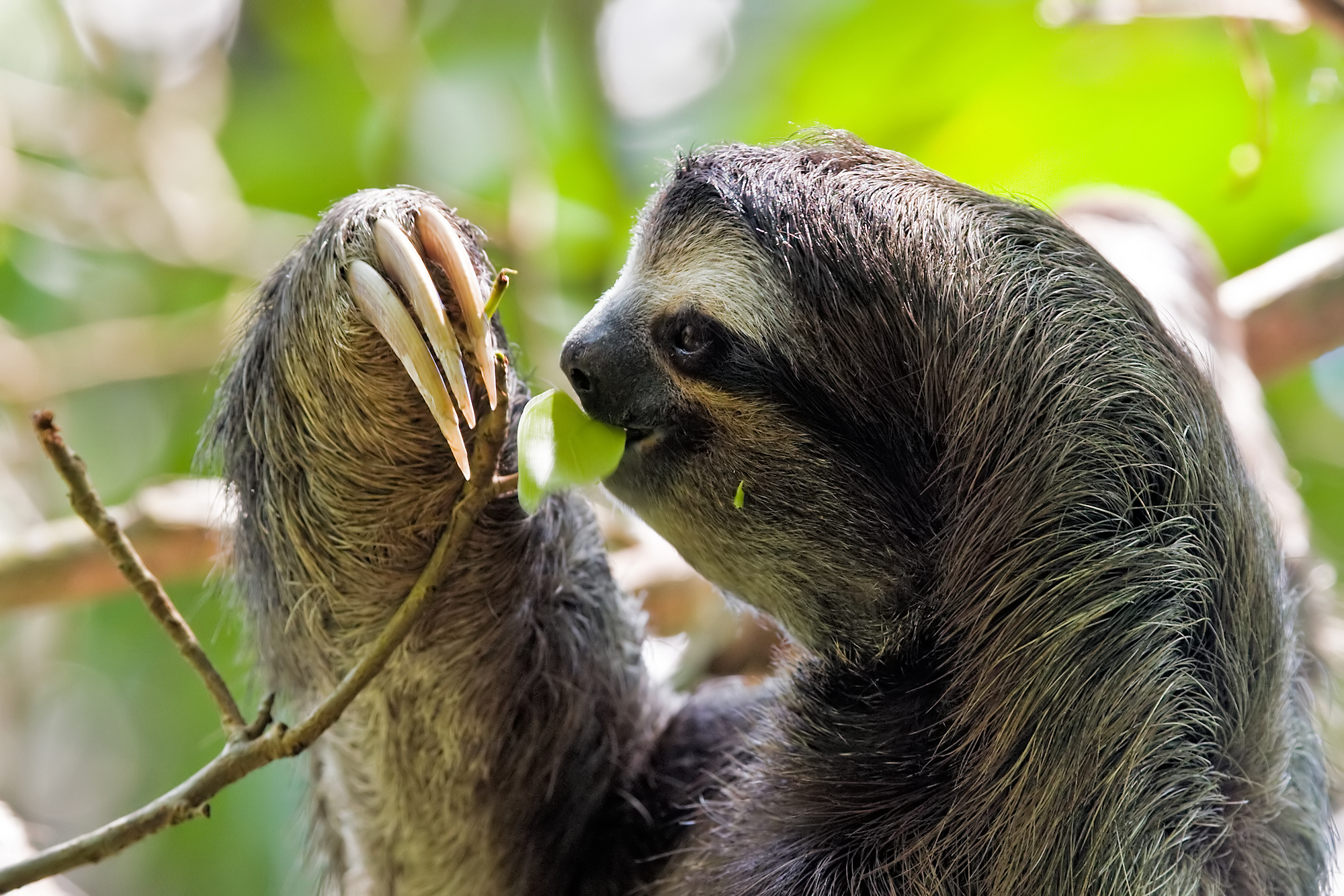
Brown-throated sloth

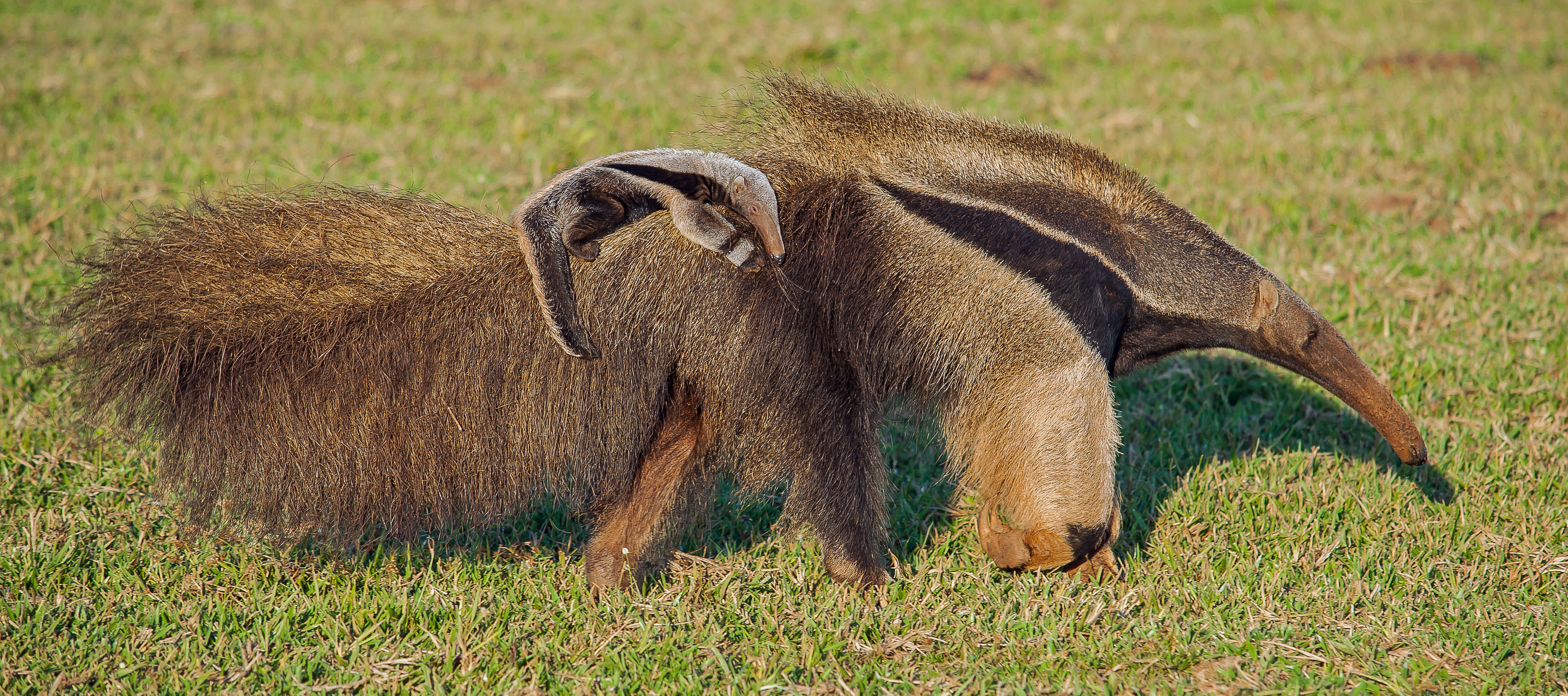
Giant anteater

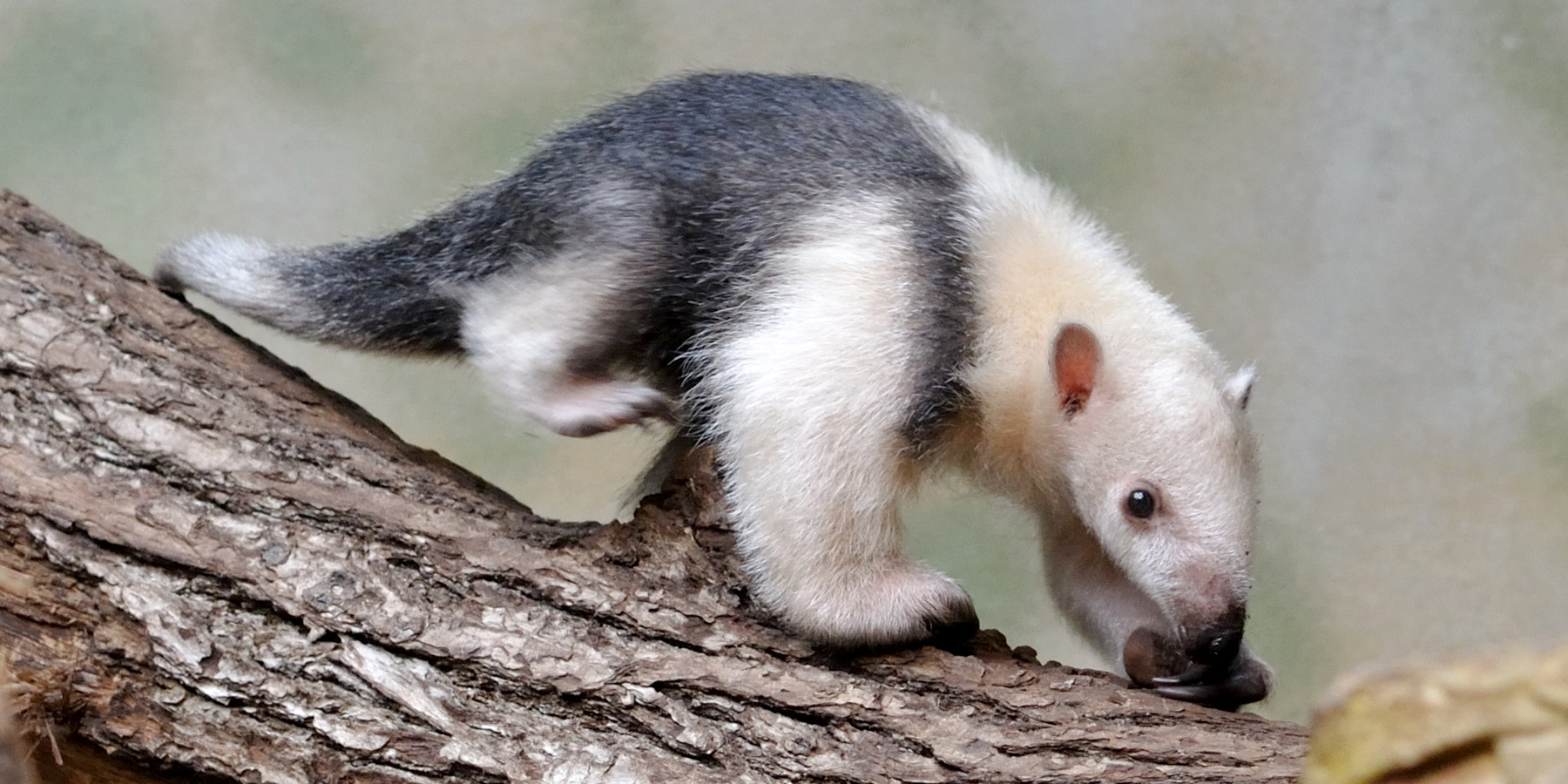
Southern tamandua

The order Pilosa is extant only in the Americas and includes the anteaters, sloths, and tamanduas. Their ancestral home is South America. Numerous ground sloths, some of which reached the size of elephants, were once present in both North and South America, as well as on the Antilles, but all went extinct following the arrival of humans.

- Suborder: Folivora
  - Family: Bradypodidae (three-toed sloths)
    - Genus: Bradypus
      - Brown-throated sloth, Bradypus variegatus LC possibly extirpated
- Suborder: Vermilingua
  - Family: Myrmecophagidae (American anteaters)
    - Genus: Myrmecophaga
      - Giant anteater, Myrmecophaga tridactyla VU
    - Genus: Tamandua
      - Southern tamandua, Tamandua tetradactyla LC

==== Superorder: Euarchontoglires ====
===== Order: Primates =====
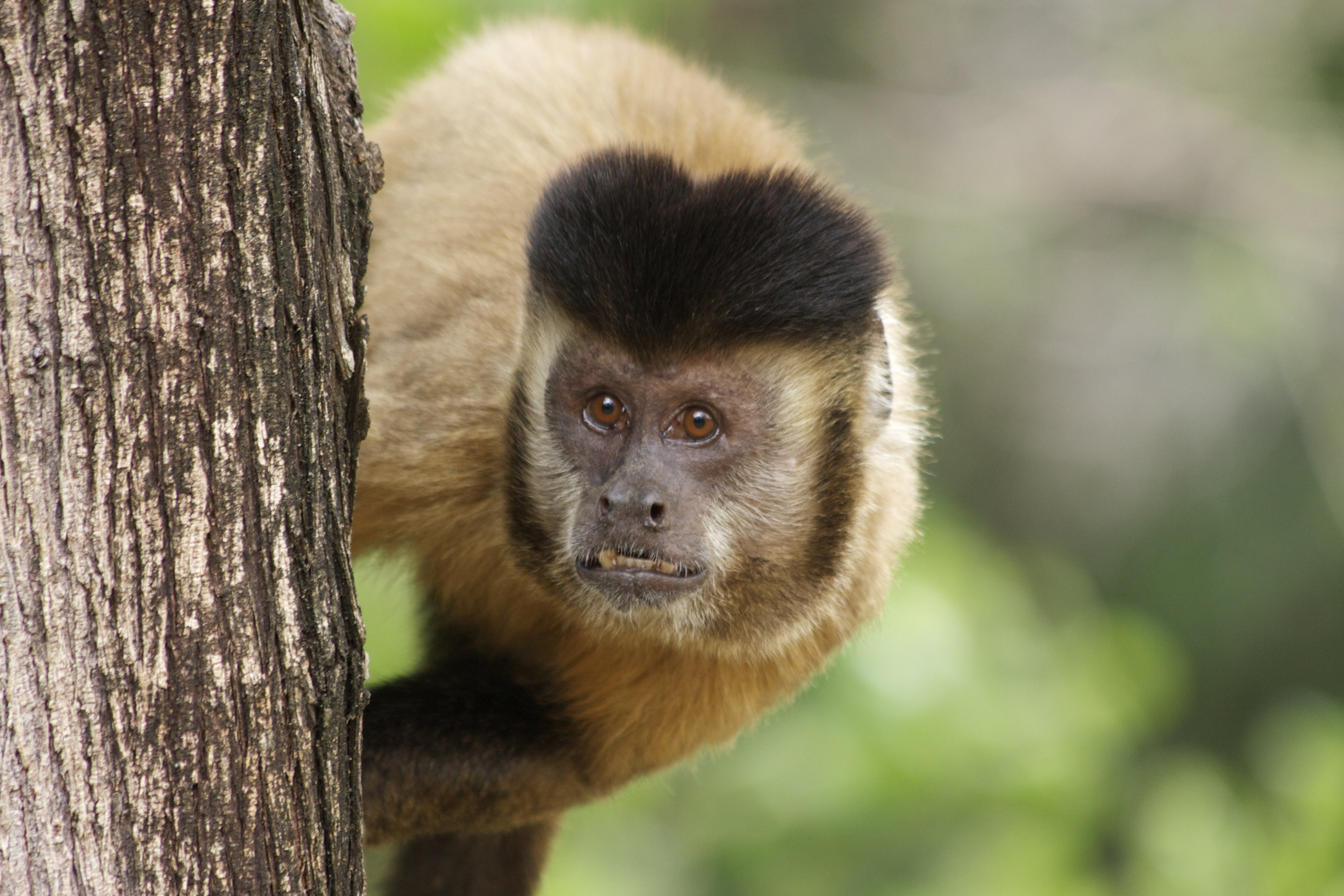
Black-striped capuchin

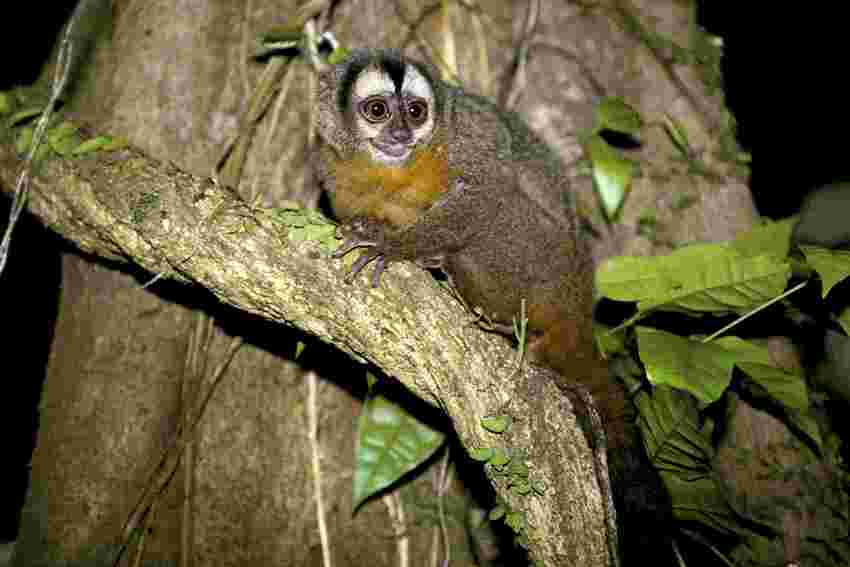
Azara's night monkey

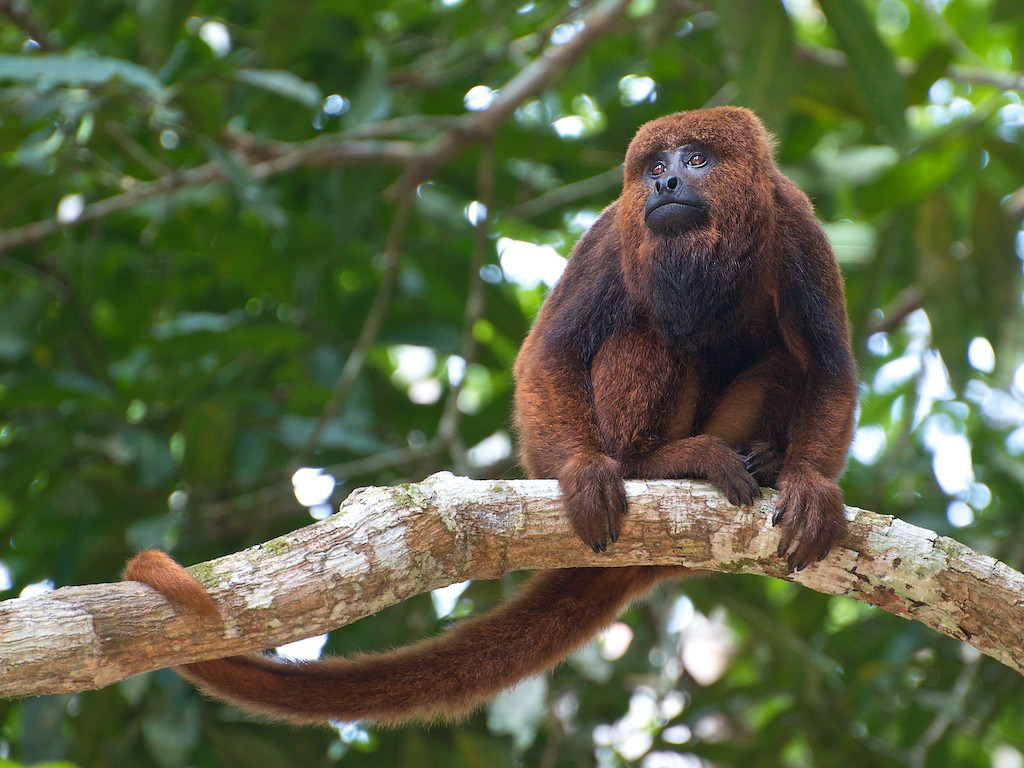
Brown howler

The order Primates contains humans and their closest relatives: lemurs, lorisoids, tarsiers, monkeys, and apes.

- Suborder: Haplorhini
  - Infraorder: Simiiformes
    - Parvorder: Platyrrhini
      - Family: Cebidae
        - Subfamily: Cebinae
          - Genus: Sapajus
            - Black-striped capuchin, Sapajus libidinosus NT
            - Black capuchin, Sapajus nigritus NT
      - Family: Aotidae
        - Genus: Aotus
          - Azara's night monkey, Aotus azarae LC
      - Family: Atelidae
        - Subfamily: Alouattinae
          - Genus: Alouatta
            - Black howler, Alouatta caraya LC
            - Brown howler, Alouatta guariba LC

===== Order: Rodentia (rodents) =====
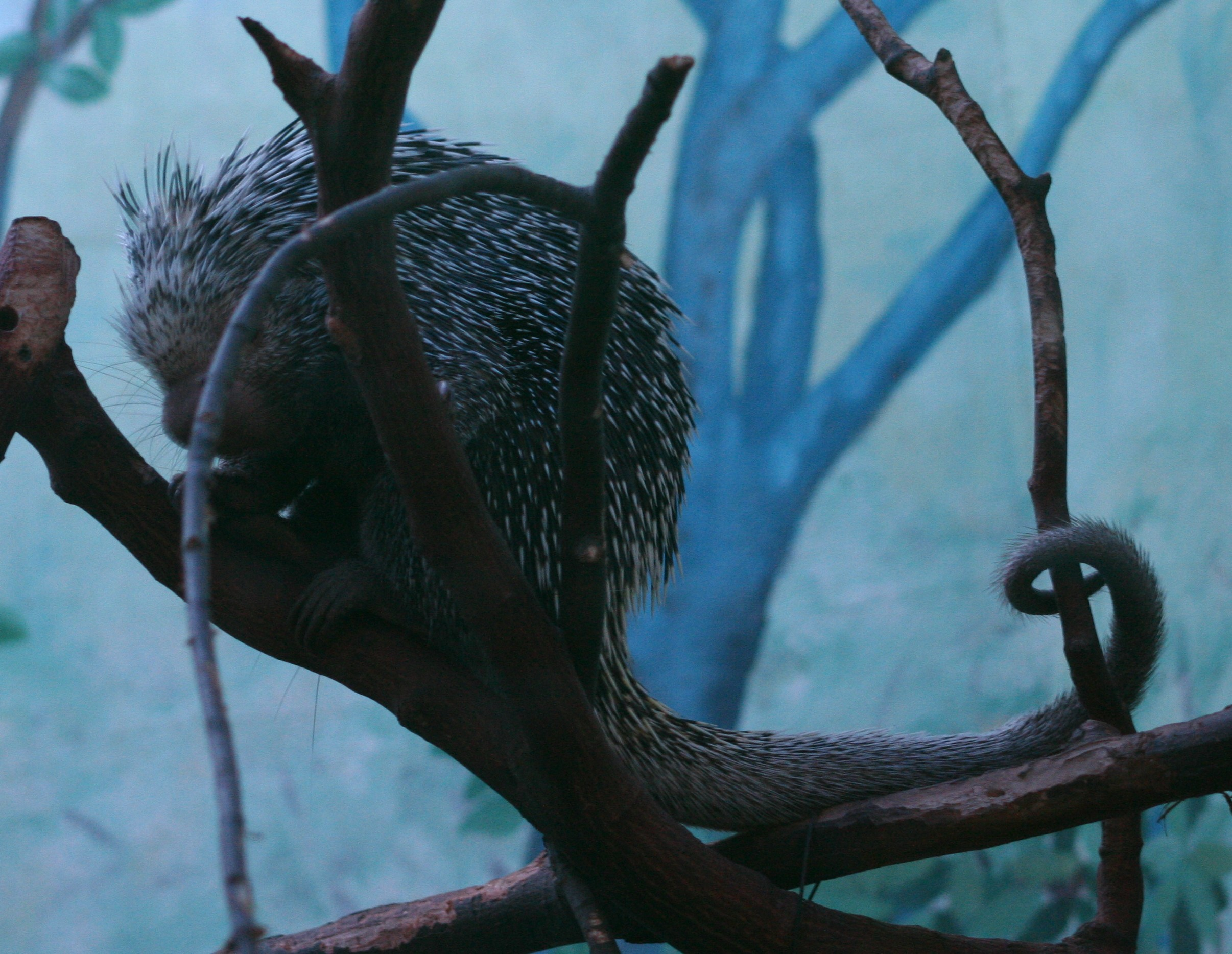
Brazilian porcupine

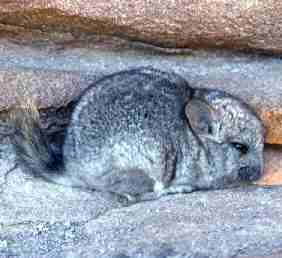
Short-tailed chinchilla

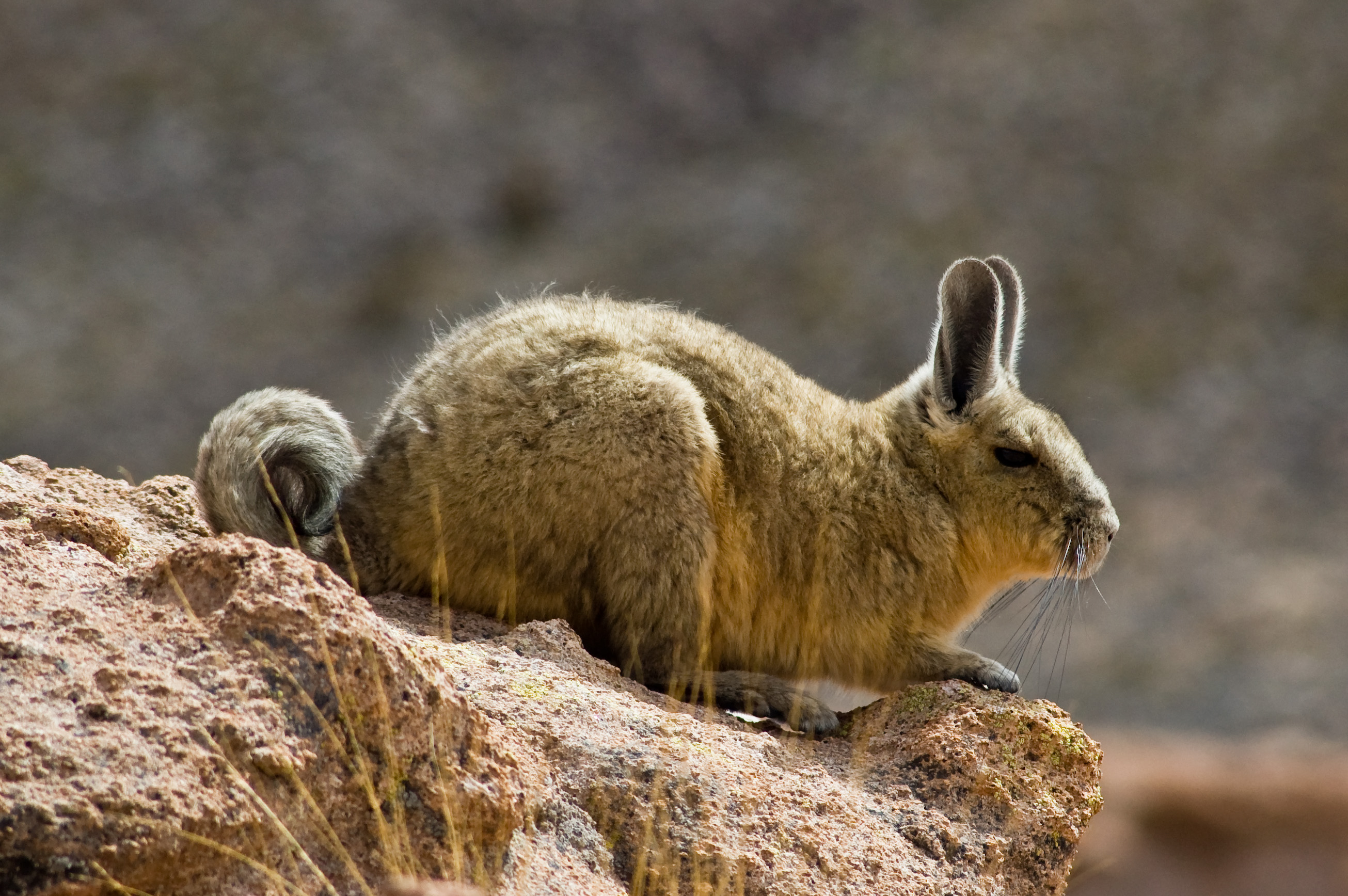
Southern viscacha

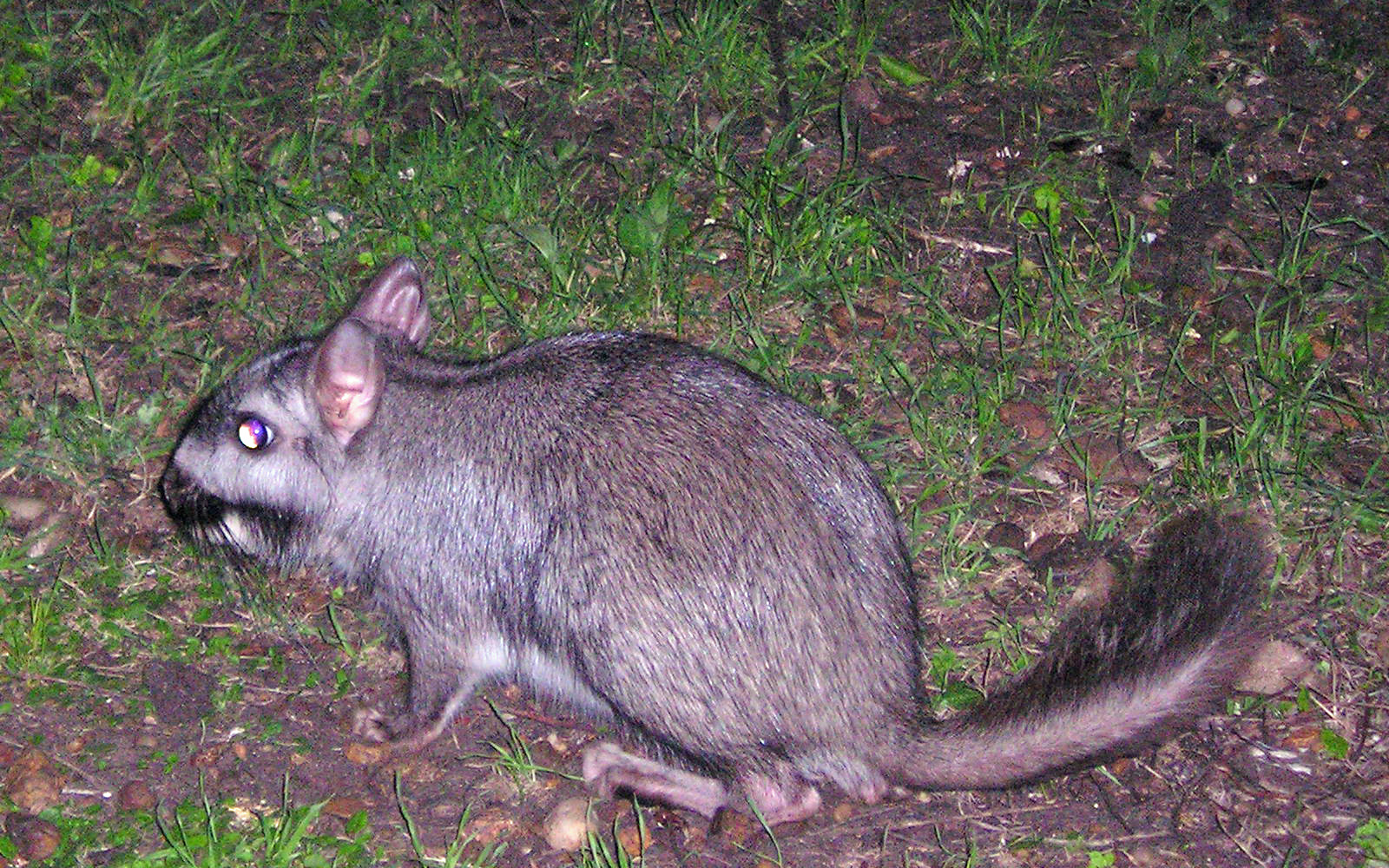
Plains viscacha

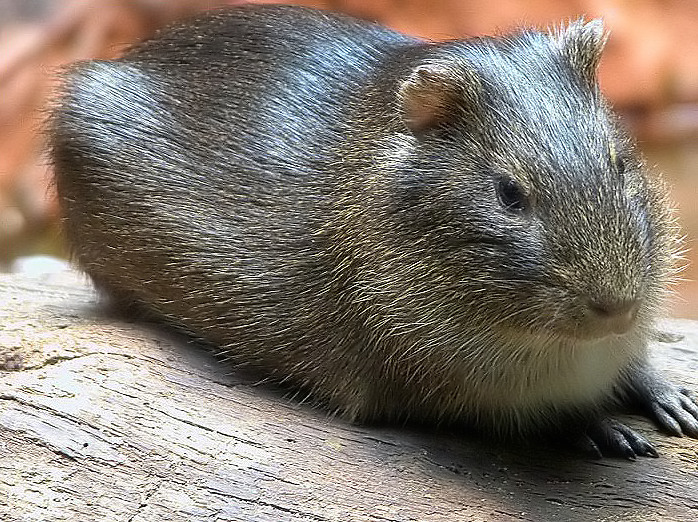
Brazilian guinea pig

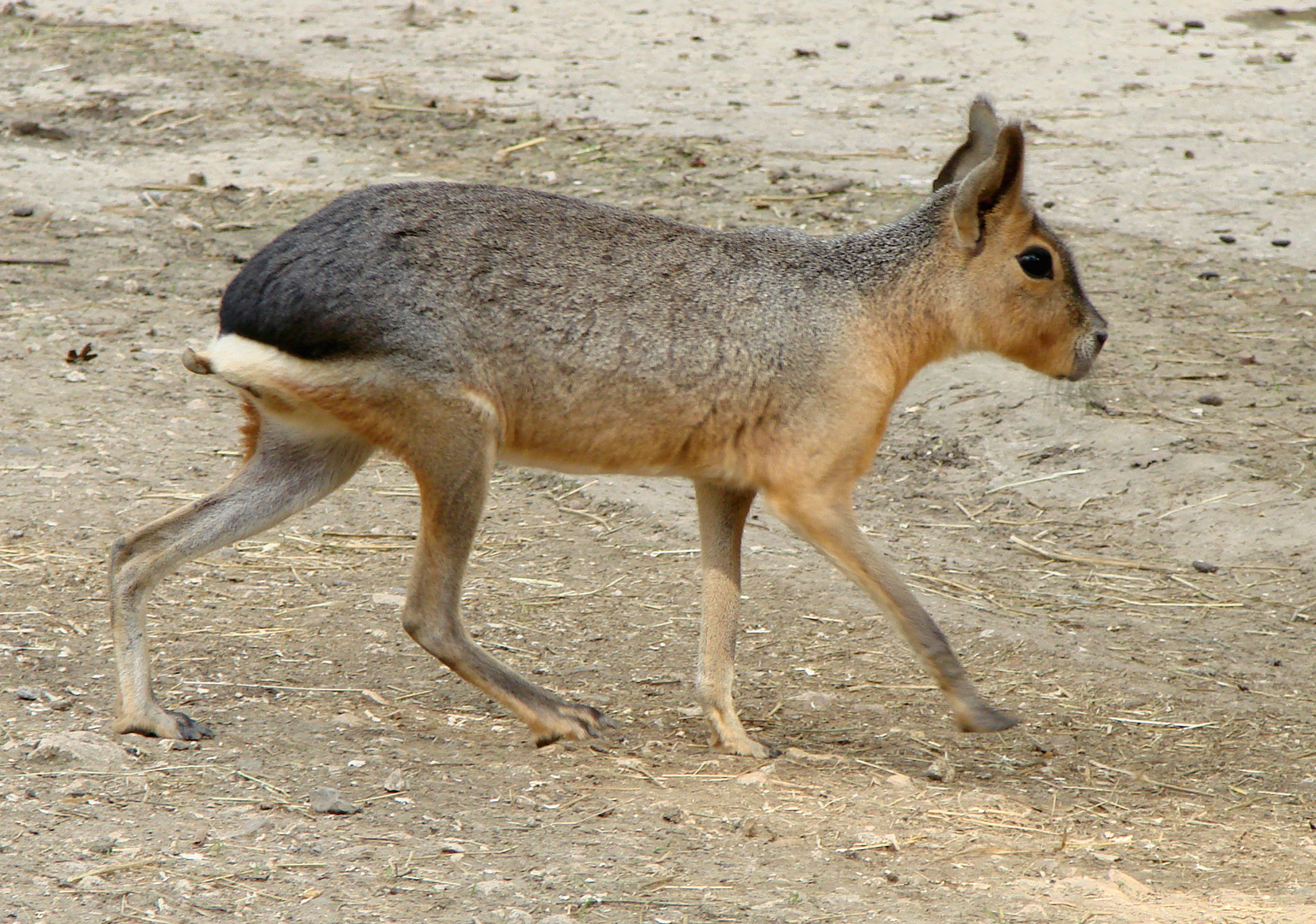
Patagonian mara

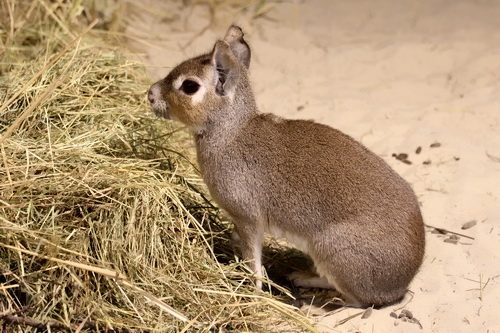
Chacoan mara

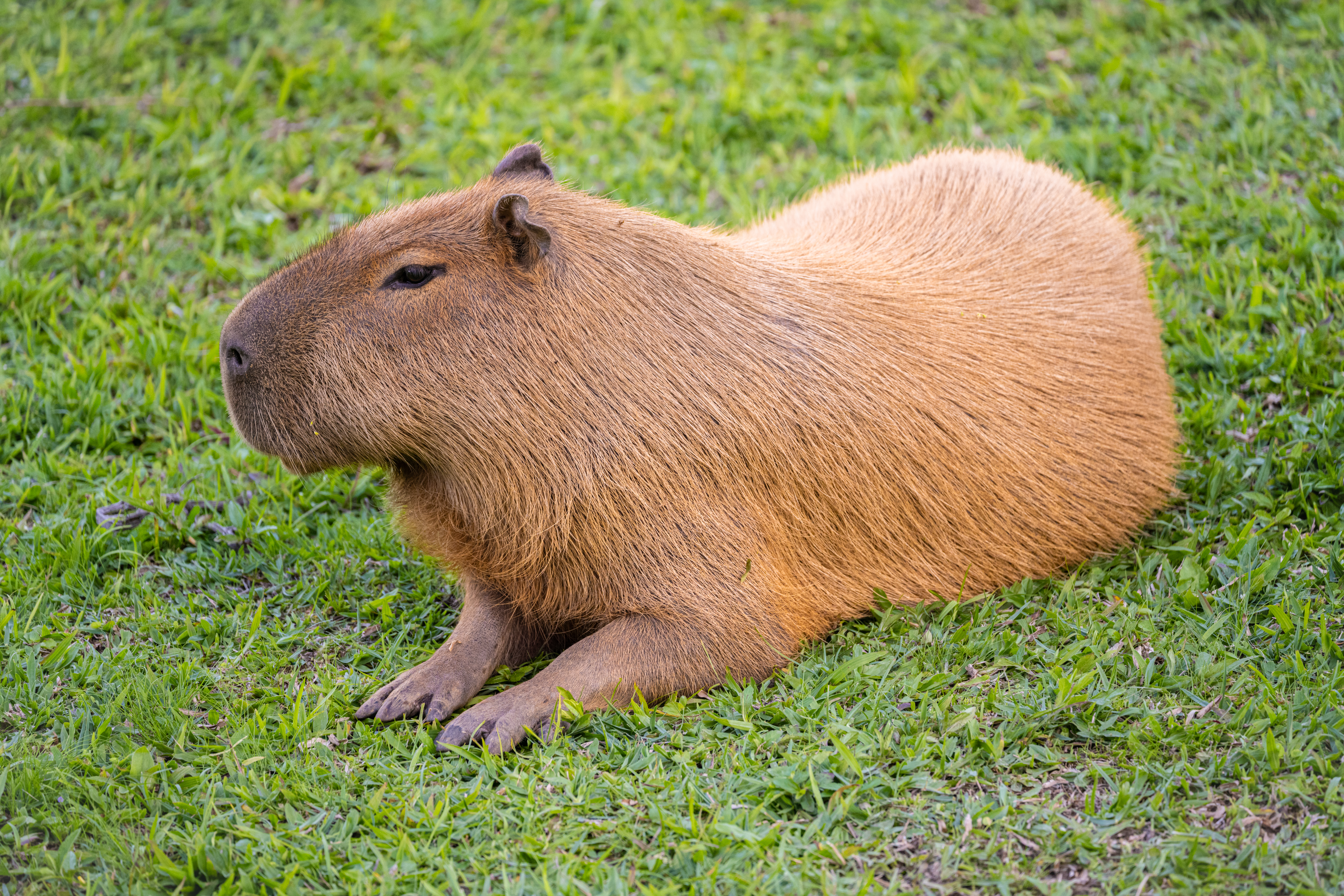
Capybara

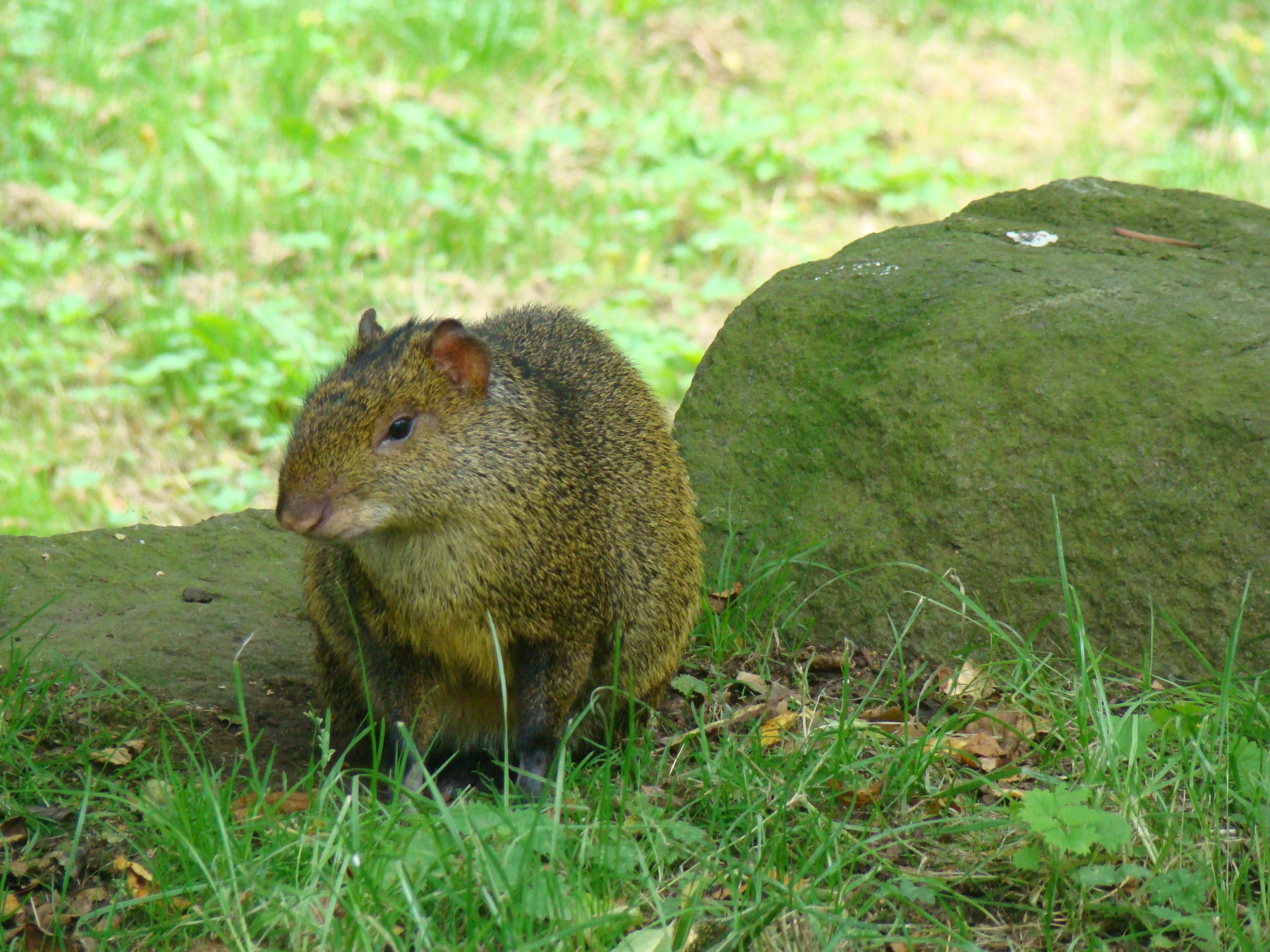
Azara's agouti

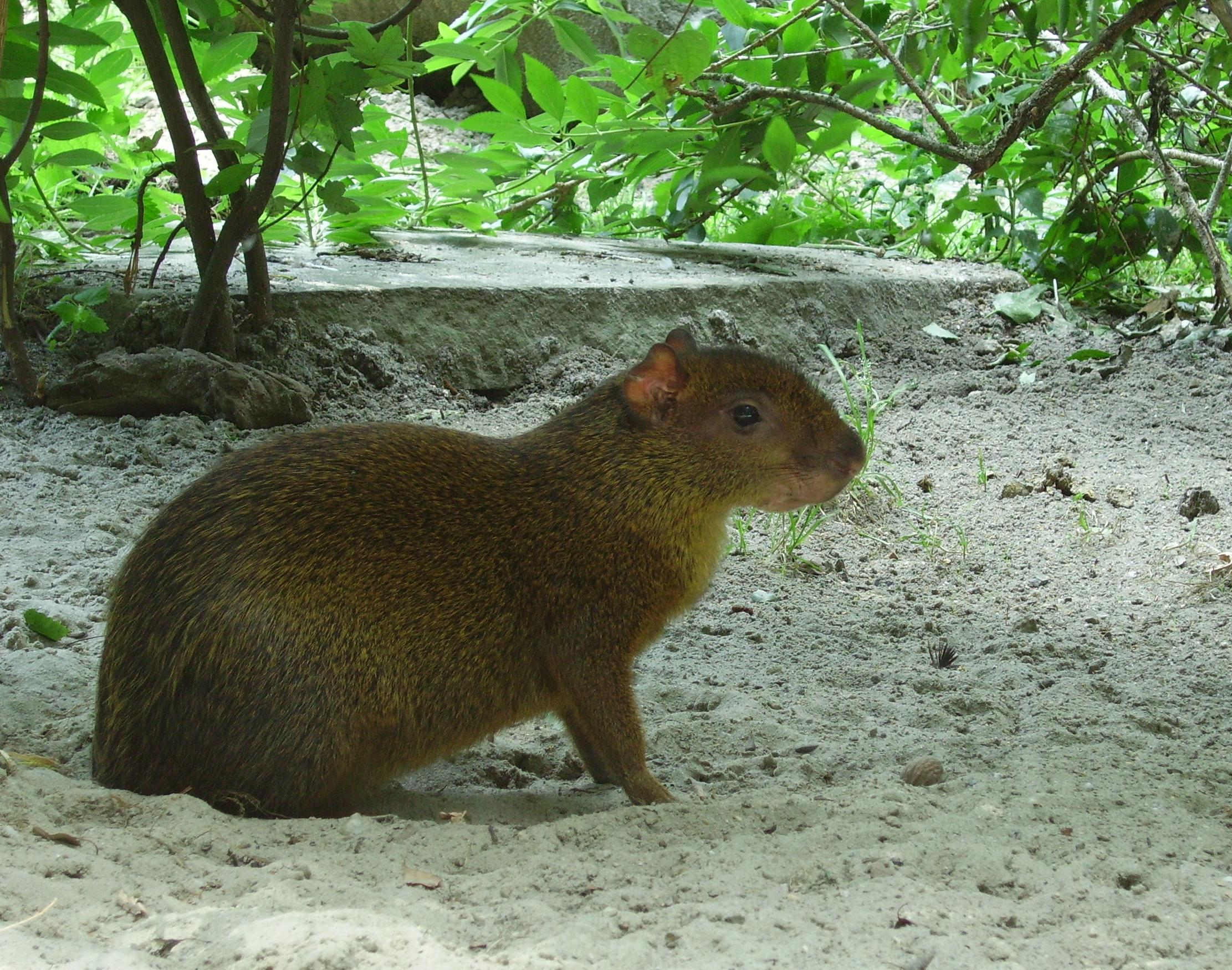
Central American agouti

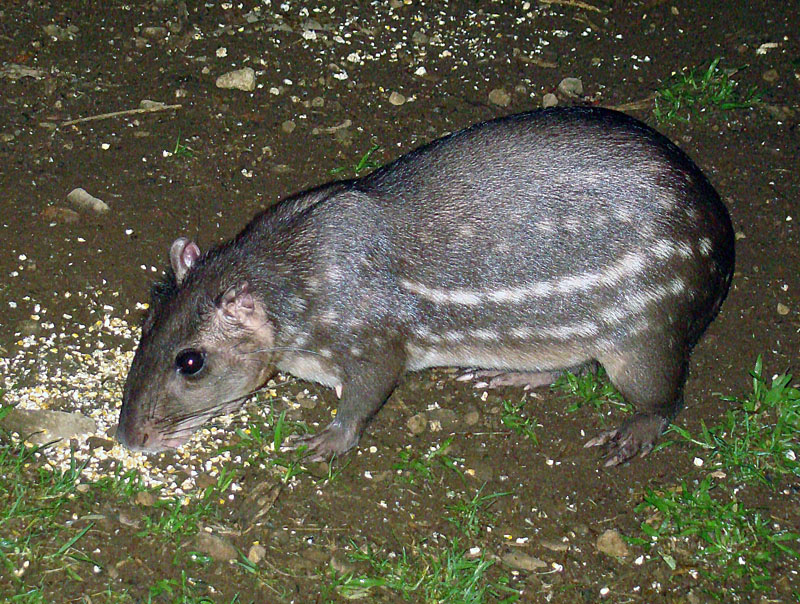
Lowland paca

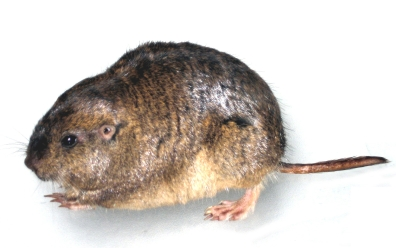
Haig's tuco-tuco

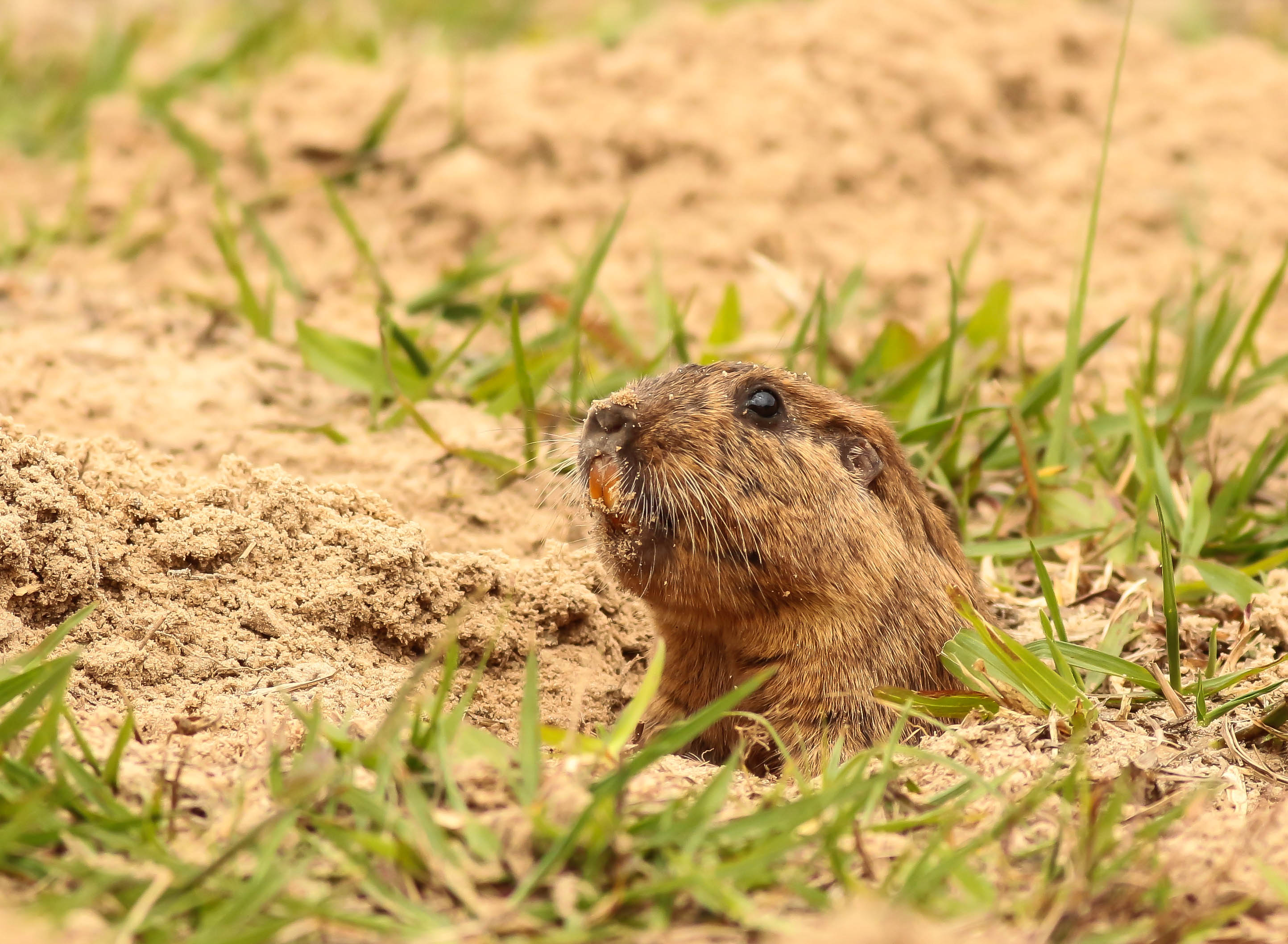
Tiny tuco-tuco

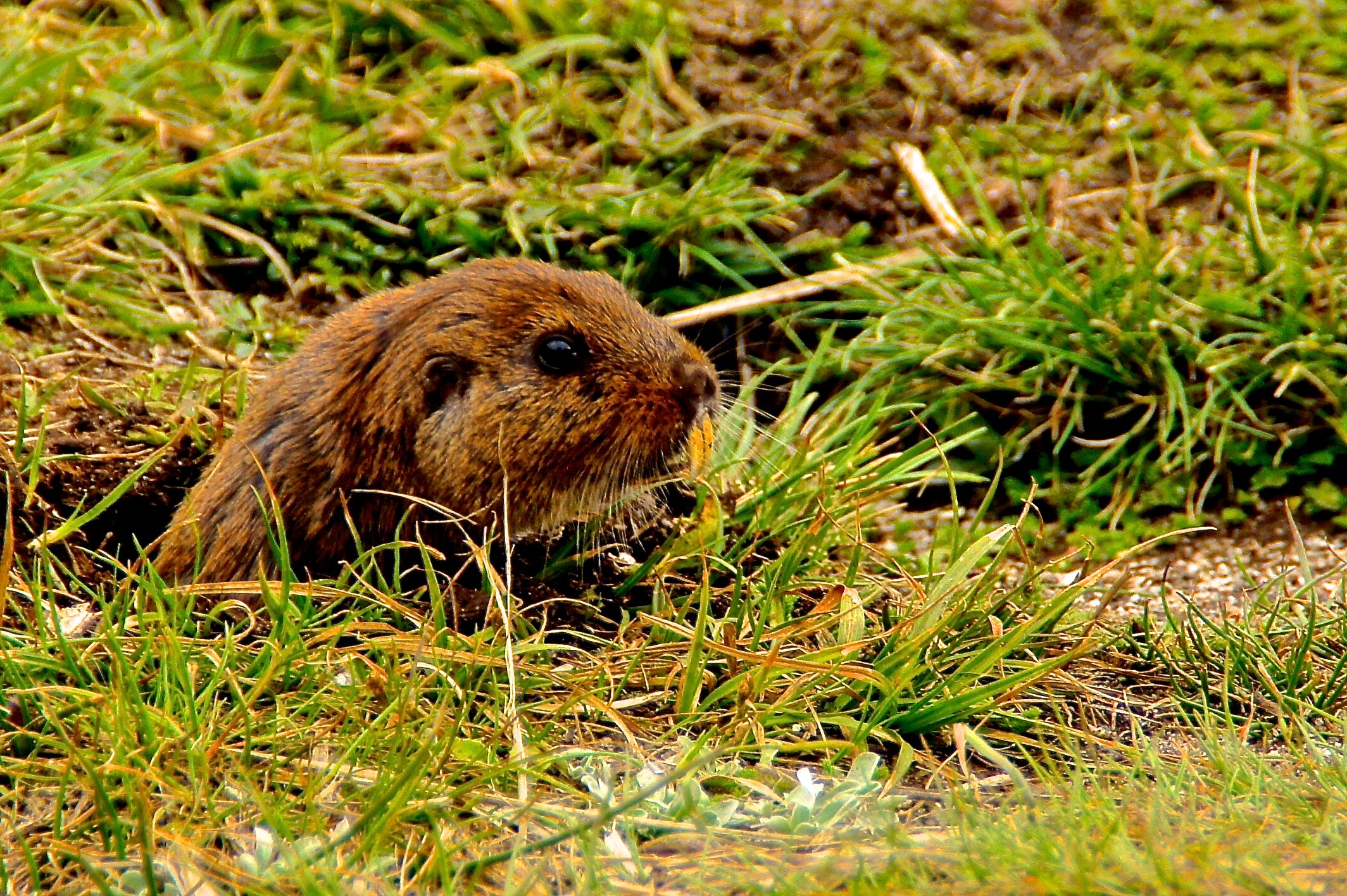
Reig's tuco-tuco

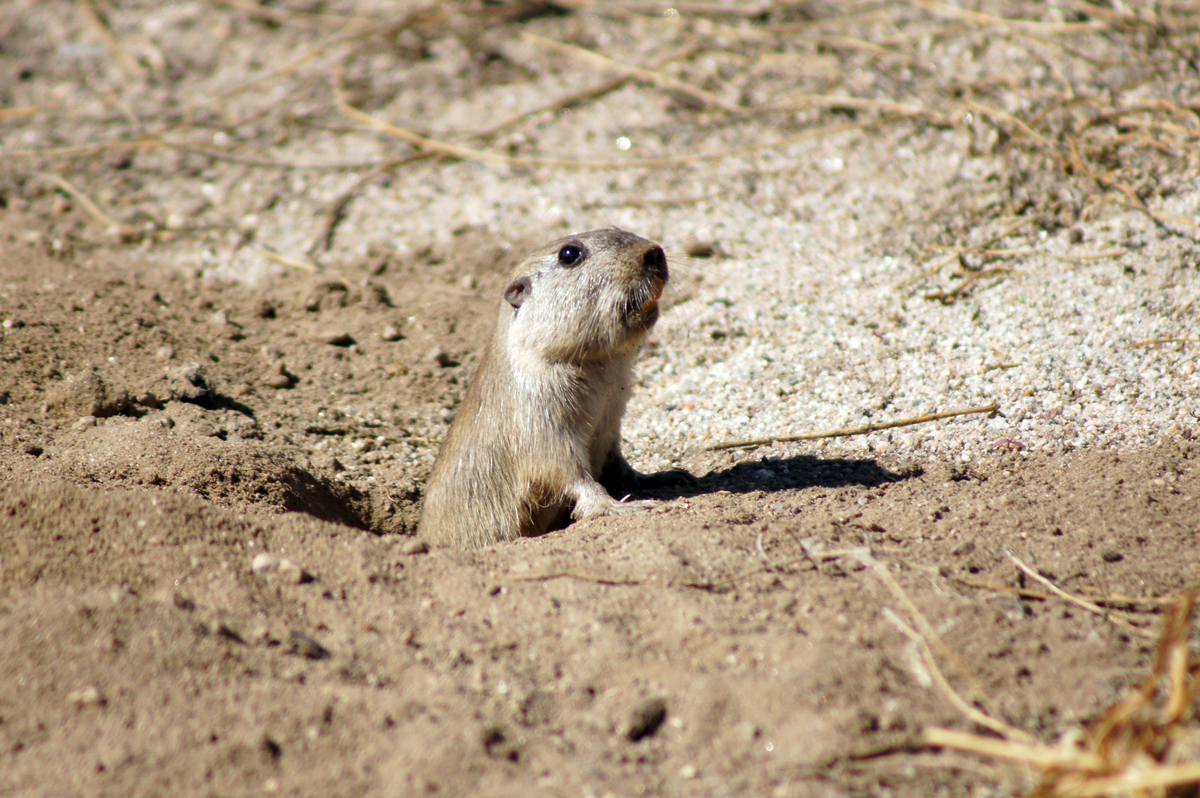
Tucuman tuco-tuco

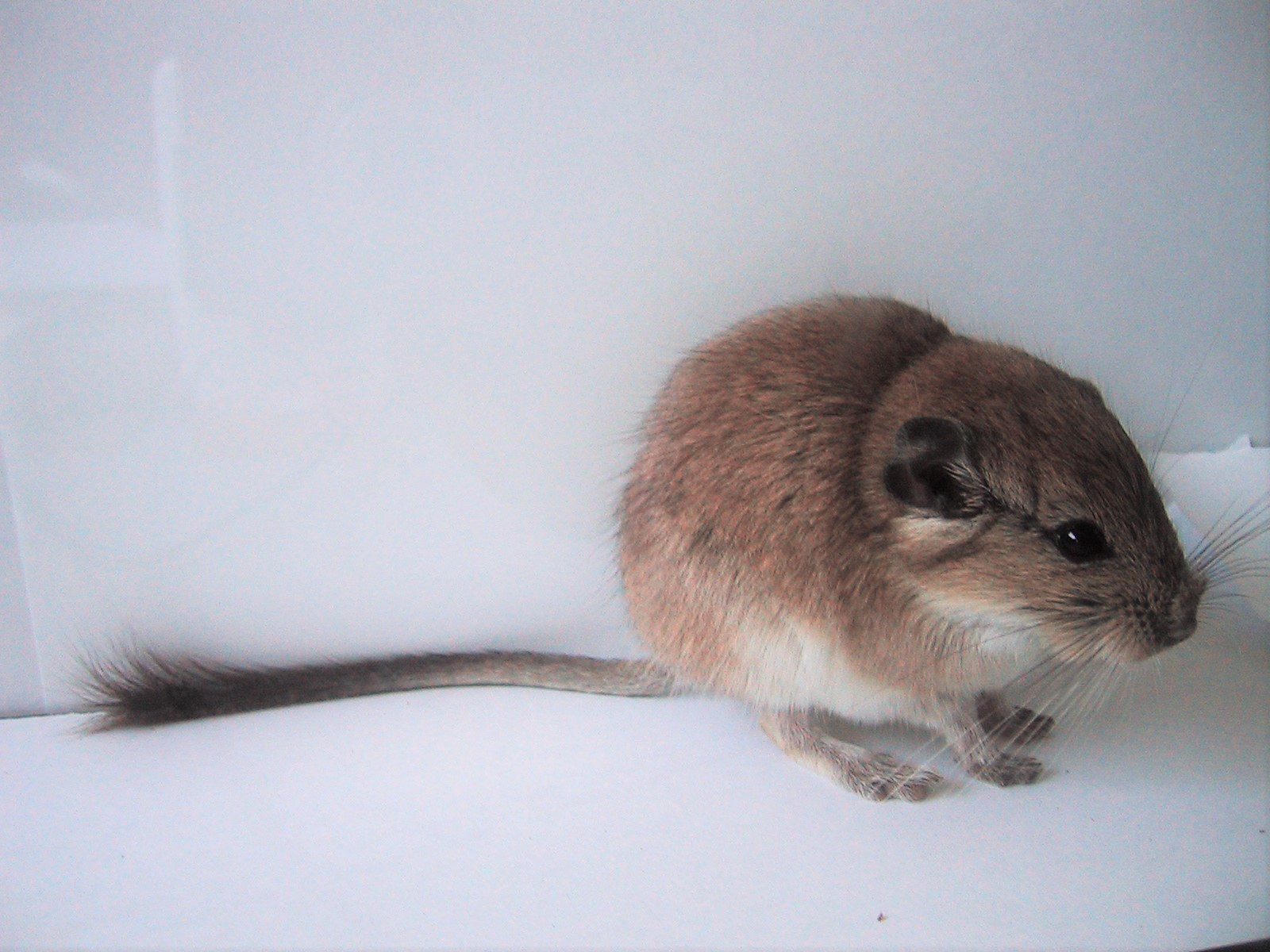
Plains viscacha rat

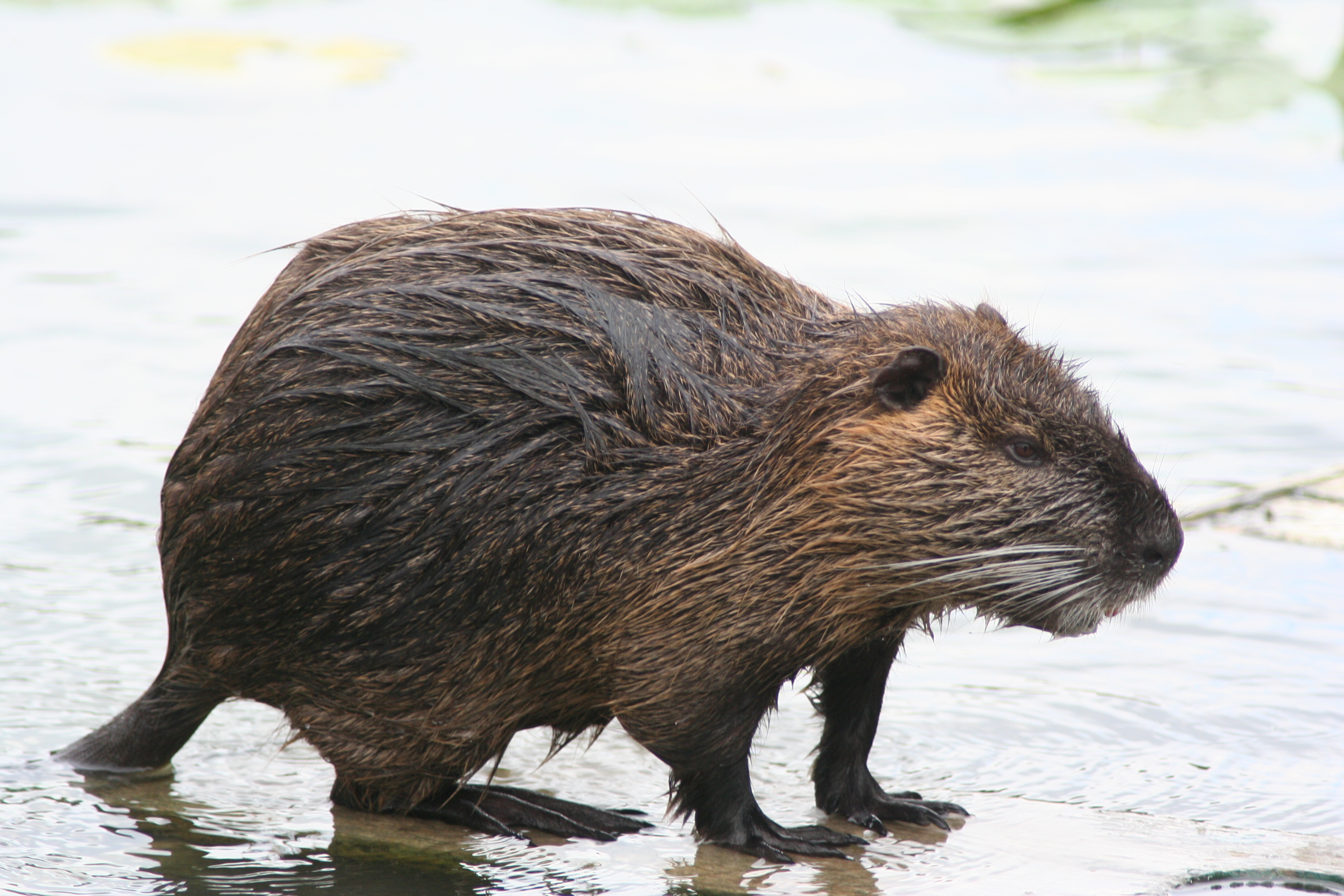
Coypu

Rodents make up the largest order of mammals, with over 40 percent of mammalian species. They have two incisors in the upper and lower jaw which grow continually and must be kept short by gnawing. Most rodents are small though the capybara can weigh up to 45 kg (100 lb).

- Suborder: Hystricomorpha
  - Family: Erethizontidae (New World porcupines)
    - Subfamily: Erethizontinae
      - Genus: Coendou
        - Bicolored-spined porcupine, Coendou bicolor LC
        - Brazilian porcupine, Coendou prehensilis LC
        - Paraguaian hairy dwarf porcupine, Coendou spinosus LC
  - Family: Chinchillidae (viscachas and chinchillas)
    - Genus: Chinchilla
      - Short-tailed chinchilla, Chinchilla chinchilla EN
    - Genus: Lagidium
      - Southern viscacha, Lagidium viscacia LC
      - Wolffsohn's viscacha, Lagidium wolffsohni DD
    - Genus: Lagostomus
      - Plains viscacha, Lagostomus maximus LC
  - Family: Caviidae (guinea pigs)
    - Subfamily: Caviinae
      - Genus: Cavia
        - Brazilian guinea pig, Cavia aperea LC
        - Montane guinea pig, Cavia tschudii LC
      - Genus: Galea
        - Common yellow-toothed cavy, Galea musteloides LC
      - Genus: Microcavia
        - Southern mountain cavy, Microcavia australis LC
        - Shipton's mountain cavy, Microcavia shiptoni NT
    - Subfamily: Dolichotinae
      - Genus: Dolichotis
        - Patagonian mara, Dolichotis patagonum NT
        - Chacoan mara, Dolichotis salinicola LC
    - Subfamily: Hydrochoerinae (capybaras and rock cavies)
      - Genus: Hydrochoerus
        - Capybara, Hydrochoerus hydrochaeris LC
  - Family: Dasyproctidae (agoutis and pacas)
    - Genus: Dasyprocta
      - Azara's agouti, Dasyprocta azarae DD
      - Central American agouti, Dasyprocta punctata LC
  - Family: Cuniculidae
    - Genus: Cuniculus
      - Lowland paca, Cuniculus paca LC
  - Family: Ctenomyidae
    - Genus: Ctenomys
      - Argentine tuco-tuco, Ctenomys argentinus NT
      - Southern tuco-tuco, Ctenomys australis EN
      - Azara's tuco-tuco, Ctenomys azarae EN
      - Berg's tuco-tuco, Ctenomys bergi EN
      - Bolivian tuco-tuco, Ctenomys boliviensis LC
      - Bonetto's tuco-tuco, Ctenomys bonettoi EN
      - Budin's tuco-tuco, Ctenomys budini NE
      - Colburn's tuco-tuco, Ctenomys colburni DD
      - Puntilla tuco-tuco, Ctenomys coludo DD
      - Conover's tuco-tuco, Ctenomys conoveri LC
      - D'Orbigny's tuco-tuco, Ctenomys dorbignyi NT
      - Emily's tuco-tuco, Ctenomys emilianus LC
      - Famatina tuco-tuco, Ctenomys famosus DD
      - Foch's tuco-tuco, Ctenomys fochi DD
      - Lago Blanco tuco-tuco, Ctenomys fodax DD
      - Reddish tuco-tuco, Ctenomys frater LC
      - Tawny tuco-tuco, Ctenomys fulvus DD
      - Haig's tuco-tuco, Ctenomys haigi LC
      - San Juan tuco-tuco, Ctenomys johannis DD
      - Jujuy tuco-tuco, Ctenomys juris DD
      - Catamarca tuco-tuco, Ctenomys knighti DD
      - Mottled tuco-tuco, Ctenomys latro EN
      - Magellanic tuco-tuco, Ctenomys magellanicus LC
      - Maule tuco-tuco, Ctenomys maulinus LC
      - Mendoza tuco-tuco, Ctenomys mendocinus LC
      - Tiny tuco-tuco, Ctenomys minutus DD
      - Furtive tuco-tuco, Ctenomys occultus EN
      - Highland tuco-tuco, Ctenomys opimus LC
      - Reig's tuco-tuco, Ctenomys osvaldoreigi CR
      - Goya tuco-tuco, Ctenomys perrensis LC
      - San Luis tuco-tuco, Ctenomys pontifex DD
      - Porteous's tuco-tuco, Ctenomys porteousi NT
      - Pundt's tuco-tuco, Ctenomys pundti EN
      - Rio Negro tuco-tuco, Ctenomys rionegrensis EN
      - Roig's tuco-tuco, Ctenomys roigi CR
      - Salta tuco-tuco, Ctenomys saltarius DD
      - Scaglia's tuco-tuco, Ctenomys scagliai DD
      - Silky tuco-tuco, Ctenomys sericeus DD
      - Social tuco-tuco, Ctenomys sociabilis CR
      - Forest tuco-tuco, Ctenomys sylvanus DD
      - Talas tuco-tuco, Ctenomys talarum LC
      - Collared tuco-tuco, Ctenomys torquatus LC
      - Robust tuco-tuco, Ctenomys tuconax DD
      - Tucuman tuco-tuco, Ctenomys tucumanus DD
      - Sierra Tontal tuco-tuco, Ctenomys tulduco DD
      - Strong tuco-tuco, Ctenomys validus DD
      - Vipos tuco-tuco, Ctenomys viperinus DD
      - Yolanda's tuco-tuco, Ctenomys yolandae DD
  - Family: Octodontidae
    - Genus: Aconaemys
      - Chilean rock rat, Aconaemys fuscus LC
      - Sage's rock rat, Aconaemys sagei DD
    - Genus: Octodon
      - Bridges's degu, Octodon bridgesi VU
    - Genus: Octodontomys
      - Mountain degu, Octodontomys gliroides LC
    - Genus: Octomys
      - Mountain viscacha rat, Octomys mimax LC
    - Genus: Pipanacoctomys
      - Golden viscacha rat, Pipanacoctomys aureus CR
    - Genus: Tympanoctomys
      - Plains viscacha rat, Tympanoctomys barrerae NT
      - Kirchner's viscacha rat, Tympanoctomys kirchnerorum DD
      - Chalchalero viscacha rat, Tympanoctomys loschalchalerosorum CR
  - Family: Abrocomidae
    - Genus: Abrocoma
      - Budin's chinchilla rat, Abrocoma budini DD
      - Ashy chinchilla rat, Abrocoma cinerea LC
      - Famatina chinchilla rat, Abrocoma famatina DD
      - Sierra del Tontal chinchilla rat, Abrocoma shistacea LC
      - Uspallata chinchilla rat, Abrocoma uspallata DD
      - Punta de Vacas chinchilla rat, Abrocoma vaccarum DD
  - Family: Echimyidae
    - Subfamily: Dactylomyinae
      - Genus: Kannabateomys
        - Atlantic bamboo rat, Kannabateomys amblyonyx LC
    - Subfamily: Eumysopinae
      - Genus: Euryzygomatomys
        - Fischer's guiara, Euryzygomatomys spinosus LC
  - Family: Myocastoridae (coypus)
    - Genus: Myocastor
      - Coypu, Myocastor coypus LC

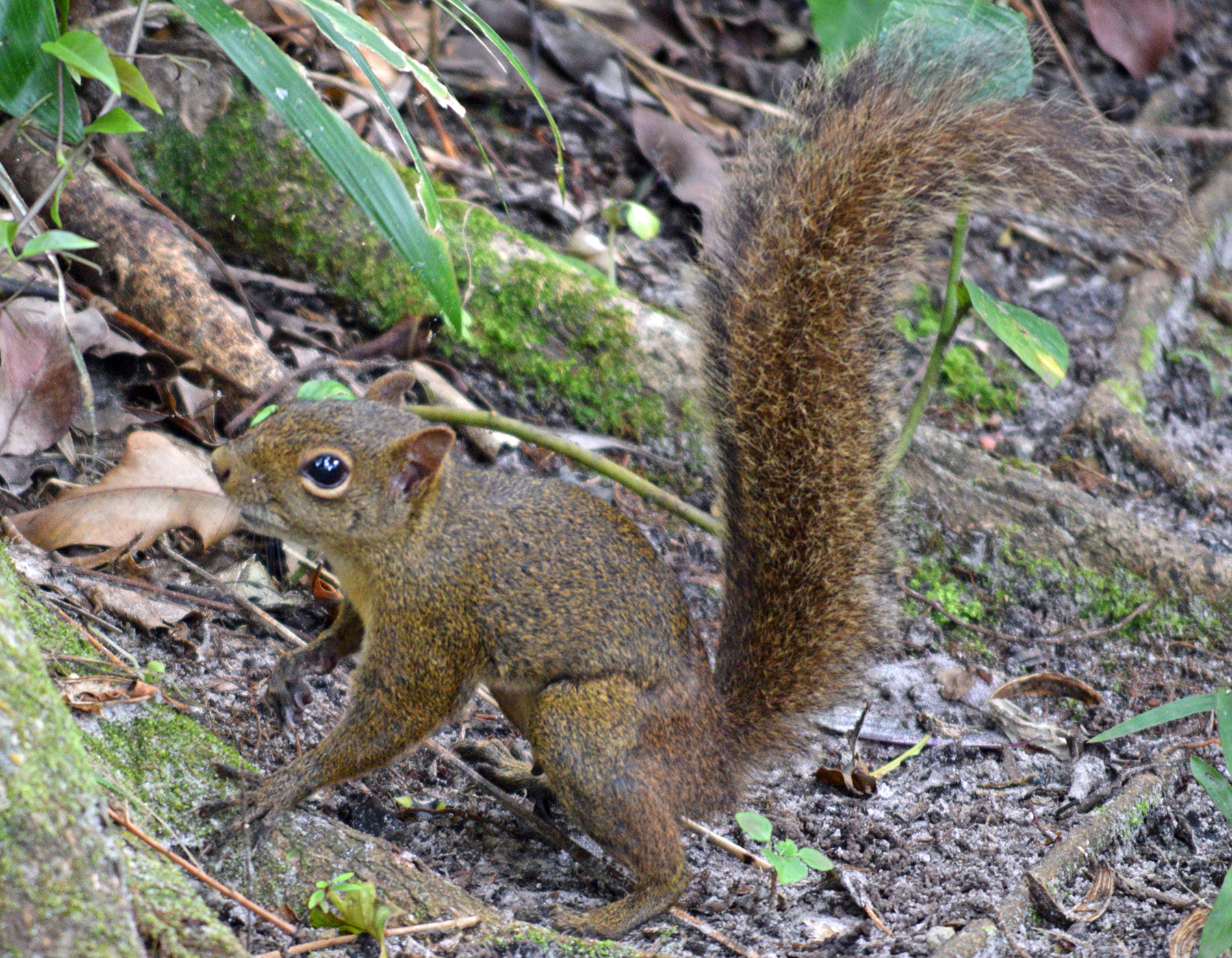
Brazilian squirrel

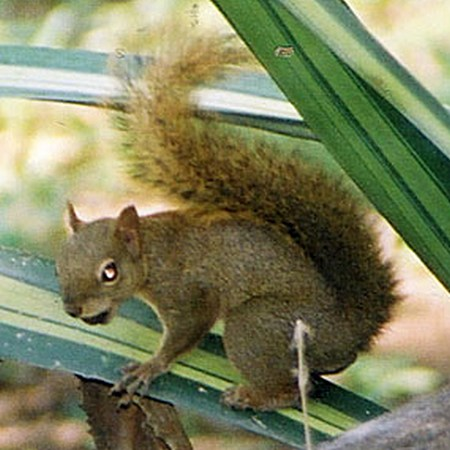
Bolivian squirrel

- Suborder: Sciurognathi
  - Family: Castoridae (beavers)
    - Genus: Castor
      - American beaver, C. canadensis LC introduced
  - Family: Sciuridae (squirrels)
    - Subfamily: Sciurinae
      - Tribe: Sciurini
        - Genus: Sciurus
          - Brazilian squirrel, Sciurus aestuans LC
          - Bolivian squirrel, Sciurus ignitus LC

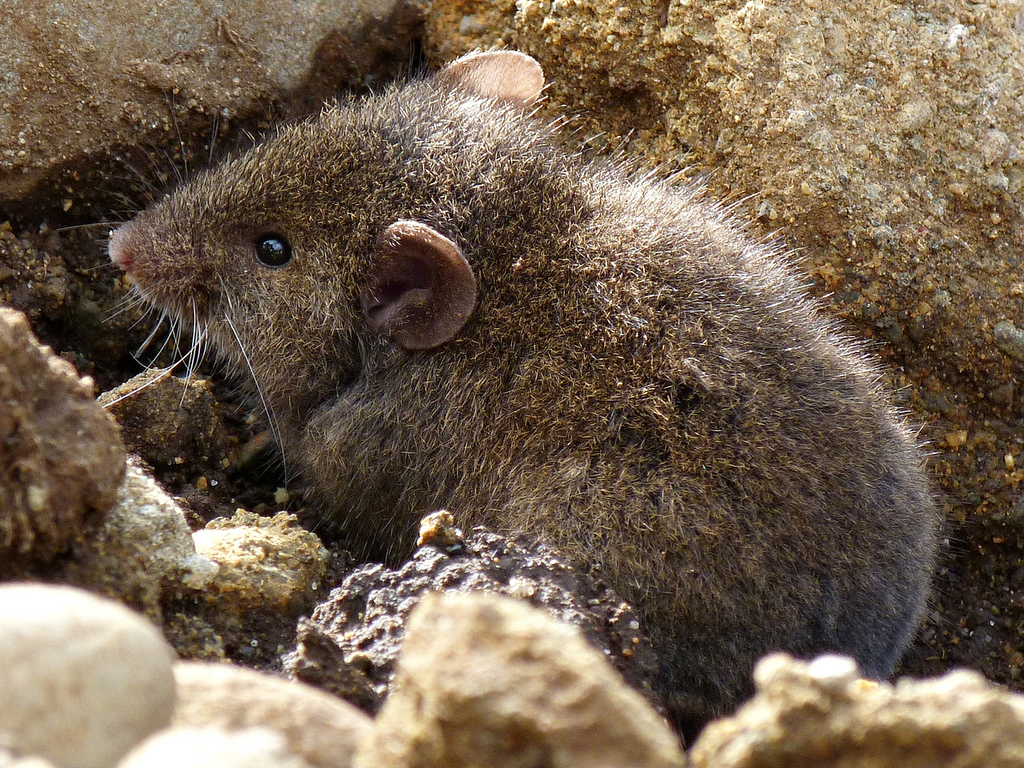
Sanborn's grass mouse

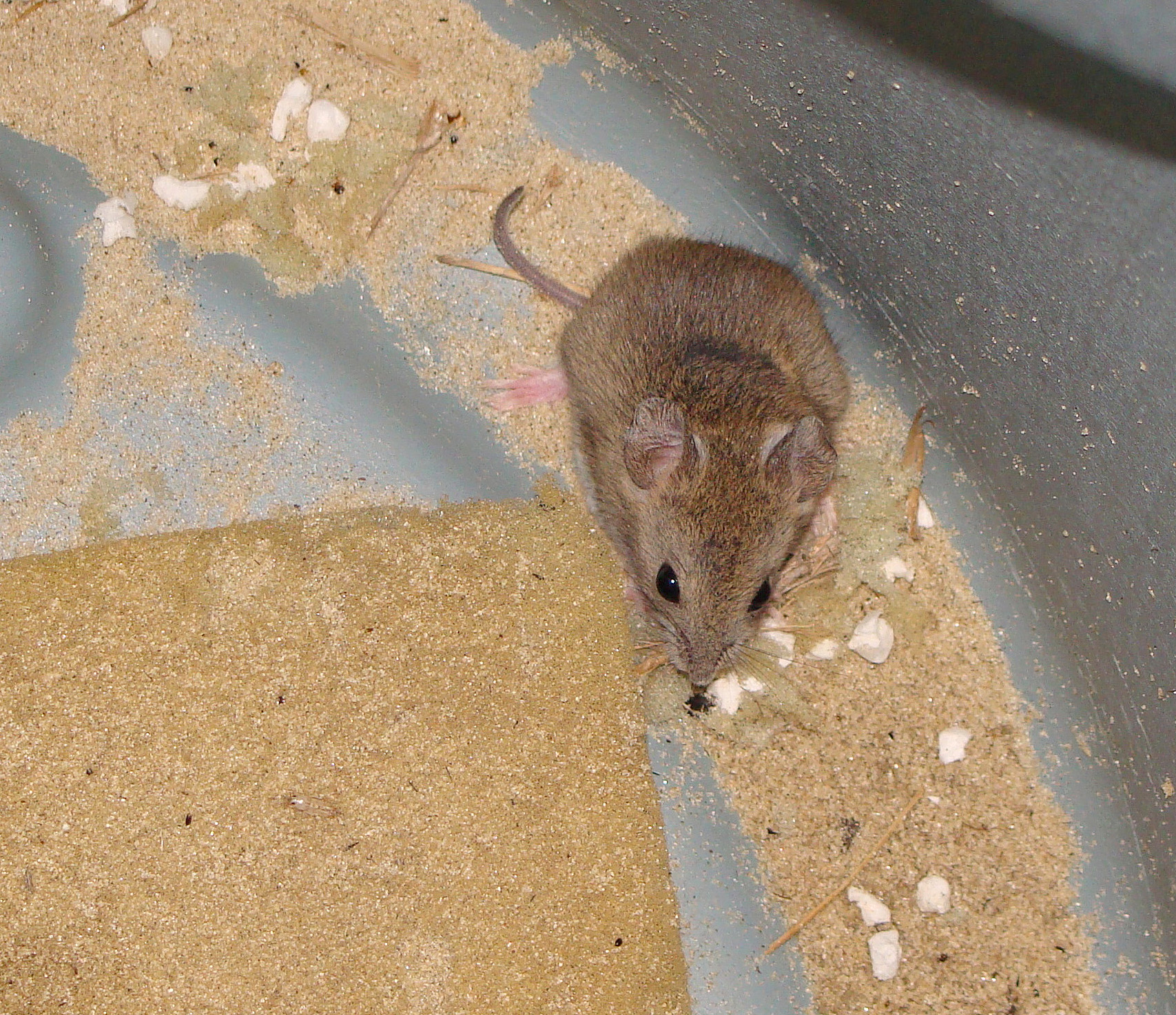
Small vesper mouse

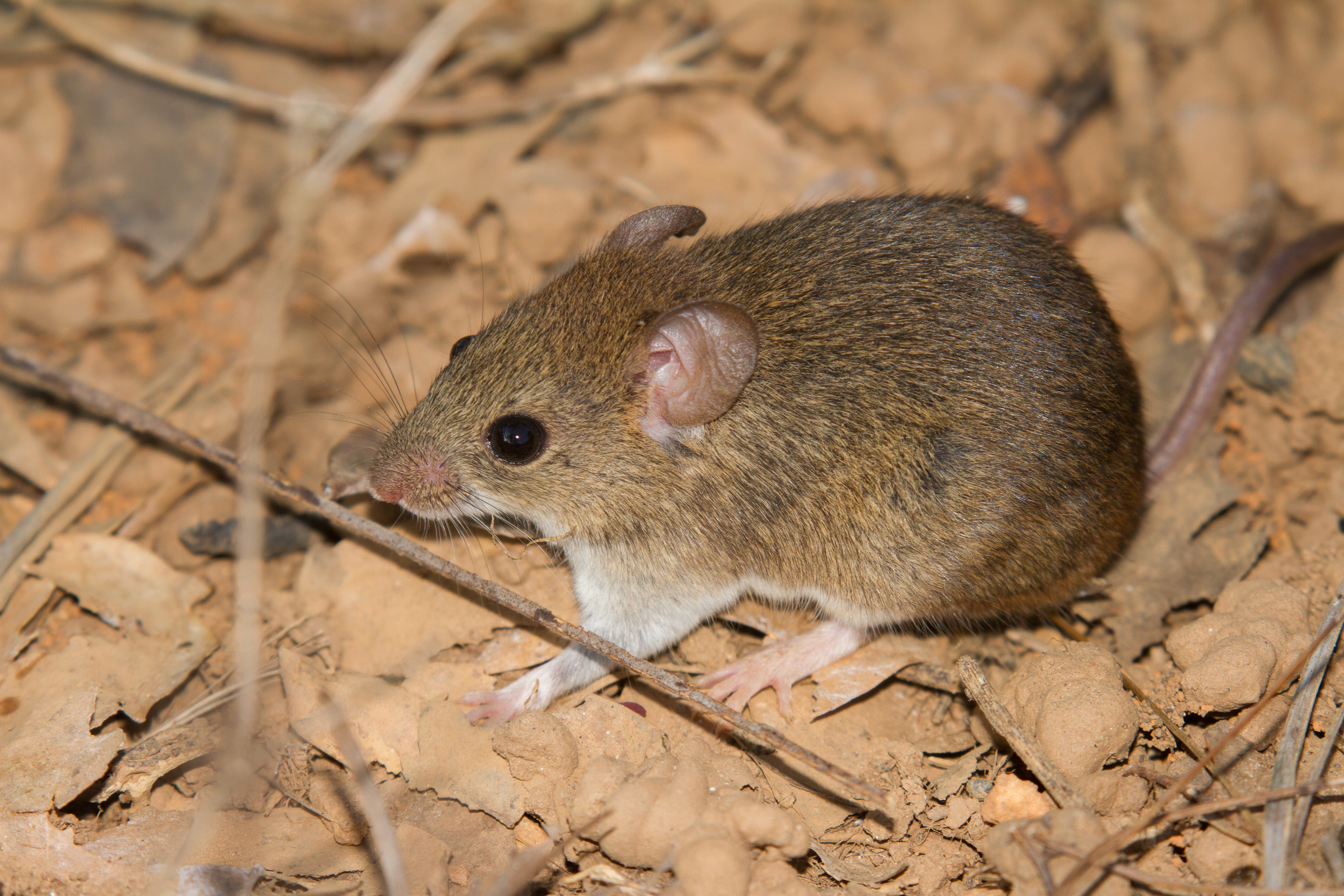
Hairy-tailed bolo mouse

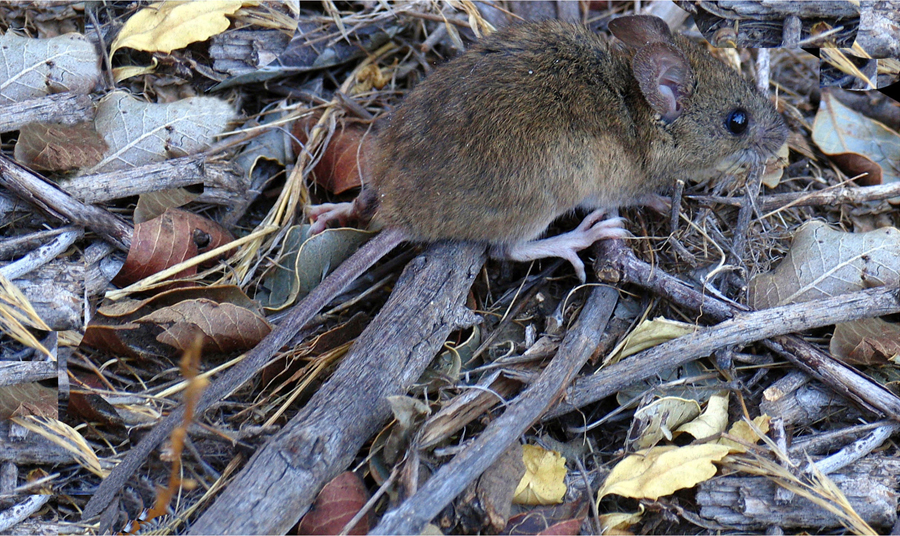
Long-tailed pygmy rice rat

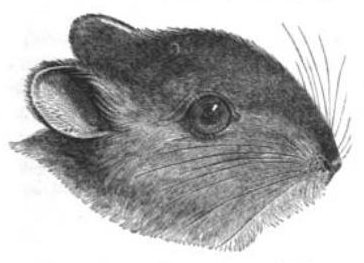
Bunny rat

  - Family: Cricetidae
    - Subfamily: Sigmodontinae
      - Genus: Abrawayaomys
        - Abrawayaomys chebezi DD
        - Ruschi's rat, Abrawayaomys ruschii LC
      - Genus: Abrothrix
        - Andean Altiplano mouse, Abrothrix andinus LC
        - Gray grass mouse, Abrothrix illuteus LC
        - Jelski's Altiplano mouse, Abrothrix jelskii LC
        - Woolly grass mouse, Abrothrix lanosus LC
        - Long-haired grass mouse, Abrothrix longipilis LC
        - Olive grass mouse, Abrothrix olivaceus LC
        - Sanborn's grass mouse, Abrothrix sanborni NT
      - Genus: Akodon
        - White-bellied grass mouse, Akodon albiventer LC
        - Azara's grass mouse, Akodon azarae LC
        - Bolivian grass mouse, Akodon boliviensis LC
        - Budin's grass mouse, Akodon budini LC
        - Akodon caenosus DD
        - Cursor grass mouse, Akodon cursor LC
        - Dolorous grass mouse, Akodon dolores LC
        - Smoky grass mouse, Akodon fumeus LC
        - Akodon glaucinus
        - Intelligent grass mouse, Akodon iniscatus LC
        - Altiplano grass mouse, Akodon lutescens LC
        - Montane grass mouse, Akodon montensis LC
        - Neuquén grass mouse, Akodon neocenus NE
        - Paraná grass mouse, Akodon paranaensis LC
        - Philip Myers's akodont, Akodon philipmyersi DD
        - Akodon polopi LC
        - White-throated grass mouse, Akodon simulator LC
        - Spegazzini's grass mouse, Akodon spegazzinii LC
        - Forest grass mouse, Akodon sylvanus LC
        - Akodon tartareus
        - Chaco grass mouse, Akodon toba LC
      - Genus: Andalgalomys
        - Olrog's chaco mouse, Andalgalomys olrogi LC
      - Genus: Andinomys
        - Andean mouse, Andinomys edax LC
      - Genus: Auliscomys
        - Andean big-eared mouse, Auliscomys sublimis LC
      - Genus: Bibimys
        - Chaco crimson-nosed rat, Bibimys chacoensis LC
        - Large-lipped crimson-nosed rat, Bibimys labiosus LC
        - Torres' crimson-nosed rat, Bibimys torresi VU
      - Genus: Blarinomys
        - Brazilian shrew-mouse, Blarinomys breviceps LC
      - Genus: Brucepattersonius
        - Guaraní brucie, Brucepattersonius guarani DD
        - Ihering's hocicudo, Brucepattersonius iheringi LC
        - Misiones brucie, Brucepattersonius misionensis DD
        - Arroyo of Paradise brucie, Brucepattersonius paradisus DD
      - Genus: Calomys
        - Bolivian vesper mouse, Calomys boliviae LC
        - Crafty vesper mouse, Calomys callidus LC
        - Large vesper mouse, Calomys callosus LC
        - Small vesper mouse, Calomys laucha LC
        - Andean vesper mouse, Calomys lepidus LC
        - Drylands vesper mouse, Calomys musculinus LC
        - Delicate vesper mouse, Calomys tener LC
        - Córdoba vesper mouse, Calomys venustus LC
      - Genus: Chelemys
        - Andean long-clawed mouse, Chelemys macronyx LC
      - Genus: Chinchillula
        - Altiplano chinchilla mouse, Chinchillula sahamae LC
      - Genus: Delomys
        - Striped Atlantic Forest rat, Delomys dorsalis LC
      - Genus: Deltamys
        - Kemp's grass mouse, Deltamys kempi LC
      - Genus: Eligmodontia
        - Monte gerbil mouse, Eligmodontia moreni LC
        - Morgan's gerbil mouse, Eligmodontia morgani LC
        - Andean gerbil mouse, Eligmodontia puerulus LC
        - Highland gerbil mouse, eastern Patagonian gerbil mouse, Eligmodontia typus LC
      - Genus: Euneomys
        - Patagonian chinchilla mouse, Euneomys chinchilloides DD
        - Burrowing chinchilla mouse, Euneomys fossor DD
        - Biting chinchilla mouse, Euneomys mordax LC
        - Peterson's chinchilla mouse, Euneomys petersoni LC
      - Genus: Euryoryzomys
        - Tarija rice rat, Euryoryzomys legatus LC
        - Russet rice rat, Euryoryzomys russatus LC
      - Genus: Geoxus
        - Long-clawed mole mouse, Geoxus valdivianus LC
      - Genus: Graomys
        - Graomys chacoensis (contains the former Graomys centralis) DD
        - Pale leaf-eared mouse, Graomys domorum LC
        - Edith's leaf-eared mouse, Graomys edithae DD
        - Gray leaf-eared mouse, Graomys griseoflavus LC
      - Genus: Holochilus
        - Web-footed marsh rat, Holochilus brasiliensis LC
        - Chaco marsh rat, Holochilus chacarius LC
      - Genus: Irenomys
        - Chilean climbing mouse, Irenomys tarsalis LC
      - Genus: Juliomys
        - Lesser Wilfred's mouse, Juliomys pictipes LC
      - Genus: Gyldenstolpia
        - Fossorial giant rat, Gyldenstolpia fronto CR
      - Genus: Loxodontomys
        - Southern big-eared mouse, Loxodontomys micropus LC
      - Genus: Necromys
        - Argentine bolo mouse, Necromys benefactus LC
        - Rufous-bellied bolo mouse, Necromys lactens LC
        - Hairy-tailed bolo mouse, Necromys lasiurus LC
        - Paraguayan bolo mouse, Necromys lenguarum LC
        - Dark bolo mouse, Necromys obscurus LC
        - Temchuk's bolo mouse, Necromys temchuki LC
      - Genus: Nectomys
        - Scaly-footed water rat, Nectomys squamipes LC
      - Genus: Neotomys
        - Andean swamp rat, Neotomys ebriosus LC
      - Genus: Notiomys
        - Edward's long-clawed mouse, Notiomys edwardsii LC
      - Genus: Oligoryzomys
        - Brenda's colilargo, Oligoryzomys brendae DD
        - Chacoan pygmy rice rat, Oligoryzomys chacoensis LC
        - Destructive pygmy rice rat, Oligoryzomys destructor LC
        - Yellow pygmy rice rat, Oligoryzomys flavescens LC
        - Fornes' colilargo, Oligoryzomys fornesi LC
        - Long-tailed pygmy rice rat, Oligoryzomys longicaudatus LC
        - Magellanic pygmy rice rat, Oligoryzomys magellanicus LC
        - Black-footed pygmy rice rat, Oligoryzomys nigripes LC
      - Genus: Oxymycterus
        - Argentine hocicudo, Oxymycterus akodontius NE
        - Hispid hocicudo, Oxymycterus hispidus LC
        - Paramo hocicudo, Oxymycterus paramensis LC
        - Quaestor hocicudo, Oxymycterus quaestor LC
        - Red hocicudo, Oxymycterus rufus LC
      - Genus: Phyllotis
        - Los Alisos leaf-eared mouse, Phyllotis alisosiensis DD
        - Anita's leaf-eared mouse, Phyllotis anitae DD
        - Buenos Aires leaf-eared mouse, Phyllotis bonariensis NT
        - Capricorn leaf-eared mouse, Phyllotis caprinus LC
        - Bunchgrass leaf-eared mouse, Phyllotis osilae LC
        - Yellow-rumped leaf-eared mouse, Phyllotis xanthopygus LC
      - Genus: Pseudoryzomys
        - Brazilian false rice rat, Pseudoryzomys simplex LC
      - Genus: Reithrodon
        - Bunny rat, Reithrodon auritus LC
        - Naked-soled conyrat, Reithrodon typicus LC
      - Genus: Rhipidomys
        - Southern climbing mouse, Rhipidomys austrinus LC
      - Genus: Salinomys
        - Delicate salt flat mouse, Salinomys delicatus DD
      - Genus: Scapteromys
        - Argentine swamp rat, Scapteromys aquaticus LC
        - Waterhouse's swamp rat, Scapteromys tumidus LC
      - Genus: Sooretamys
        - Paraguayan rice rat, Sooretamys angouya LC
      - Genus: Tapecomys
        - Primordial tapecua, Tapecomys primus LC
      - Genus: Thaptomys
        - Blackish grass mouse, Thaptomys nigrita LC

===== Order: Lagomorpha (lagomorphs) =====
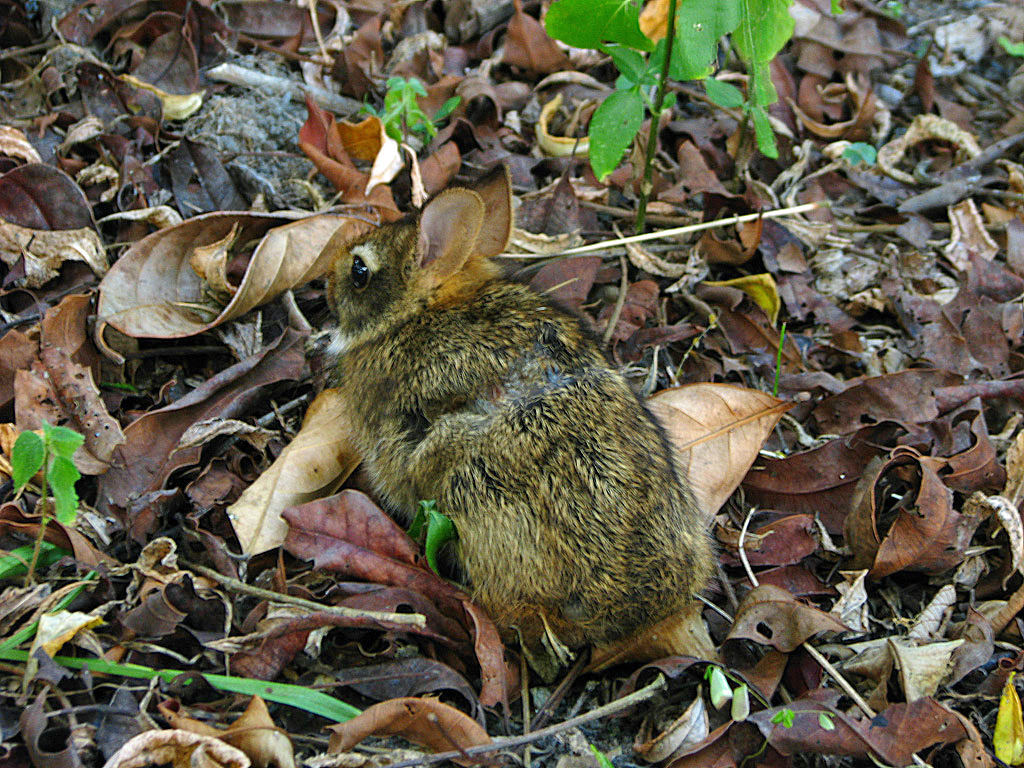
Tapeti

The lagomorphs comprise two families, Leporidae (hares and rabbits), and Ochotonidae (pikas). Though they can resemble rodents, and were classified as a superfamily in that order until the early 20th century, they have since been considered a separate order. They differ from rodents in a number of physical characteristics, such as having four incisors in the upper jaw rather than two.

- Family: Leporidae (rabbits, hares)
  - Genus: Sylvilagus
    - Common tapetí, Sylvilagus brasiliensis EN

==== Superorder: Laurasiatheria ====
===== Order: Chiroptera (bats) =====
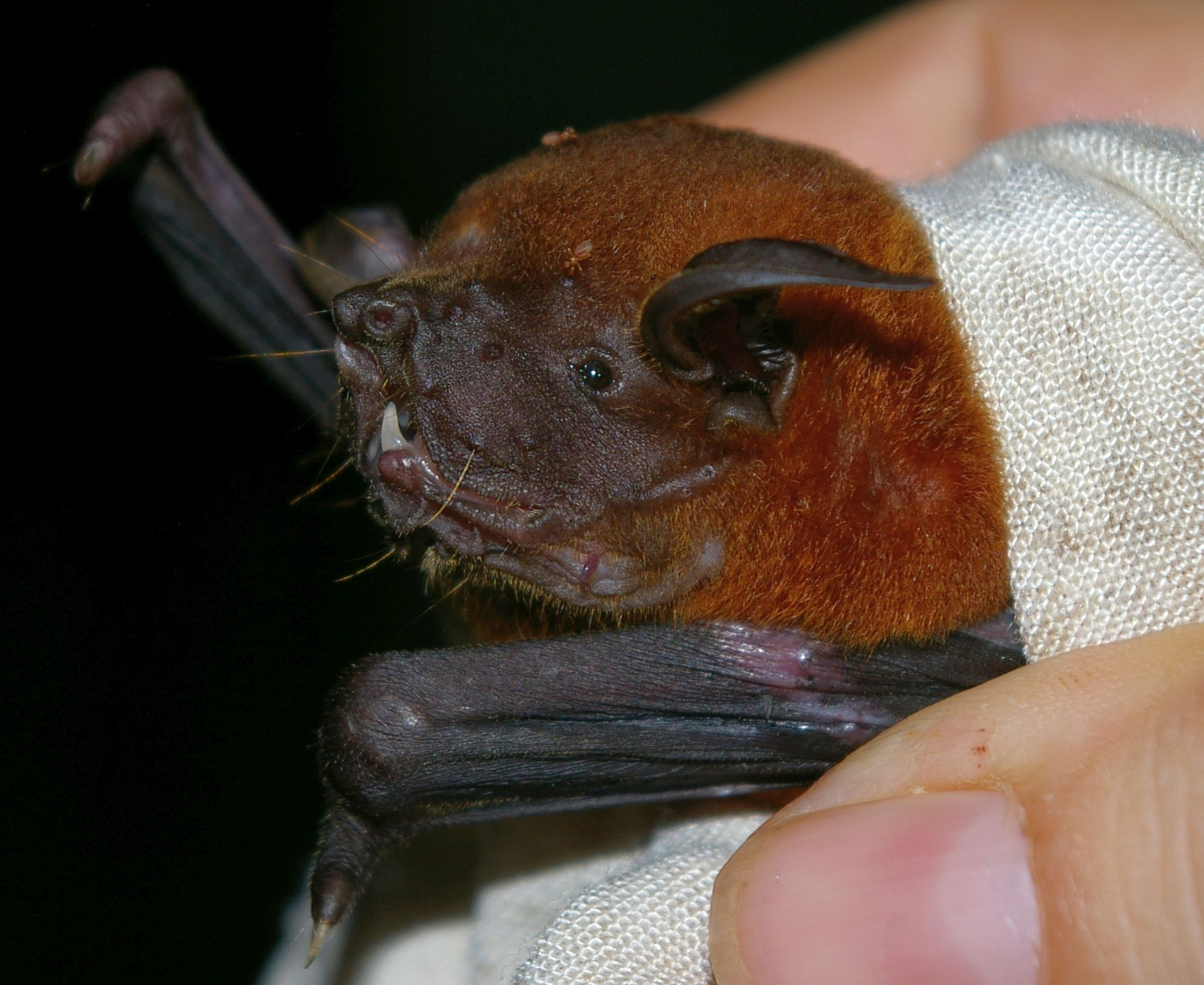
Lesser bulldog bat

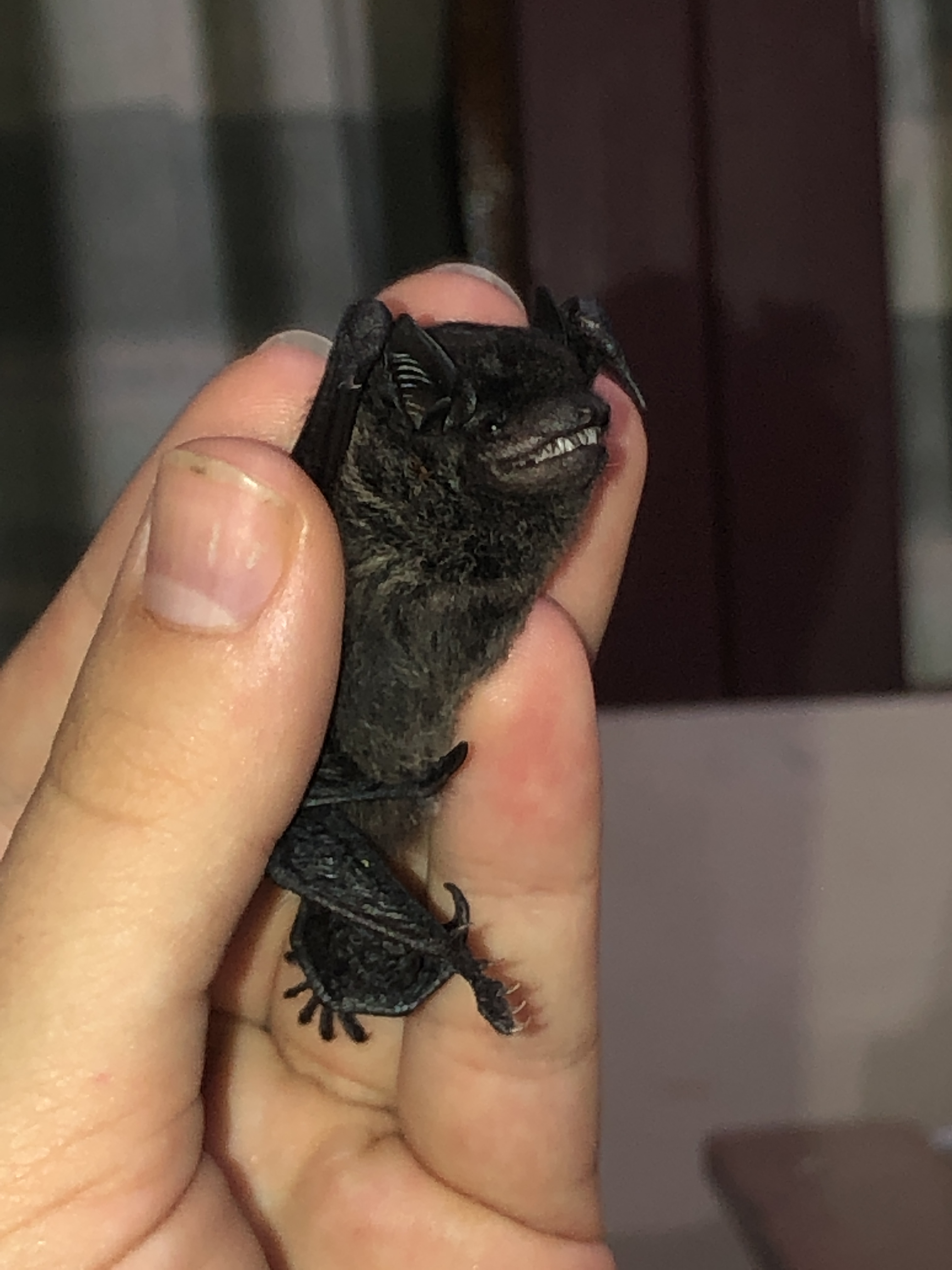
Black myotis

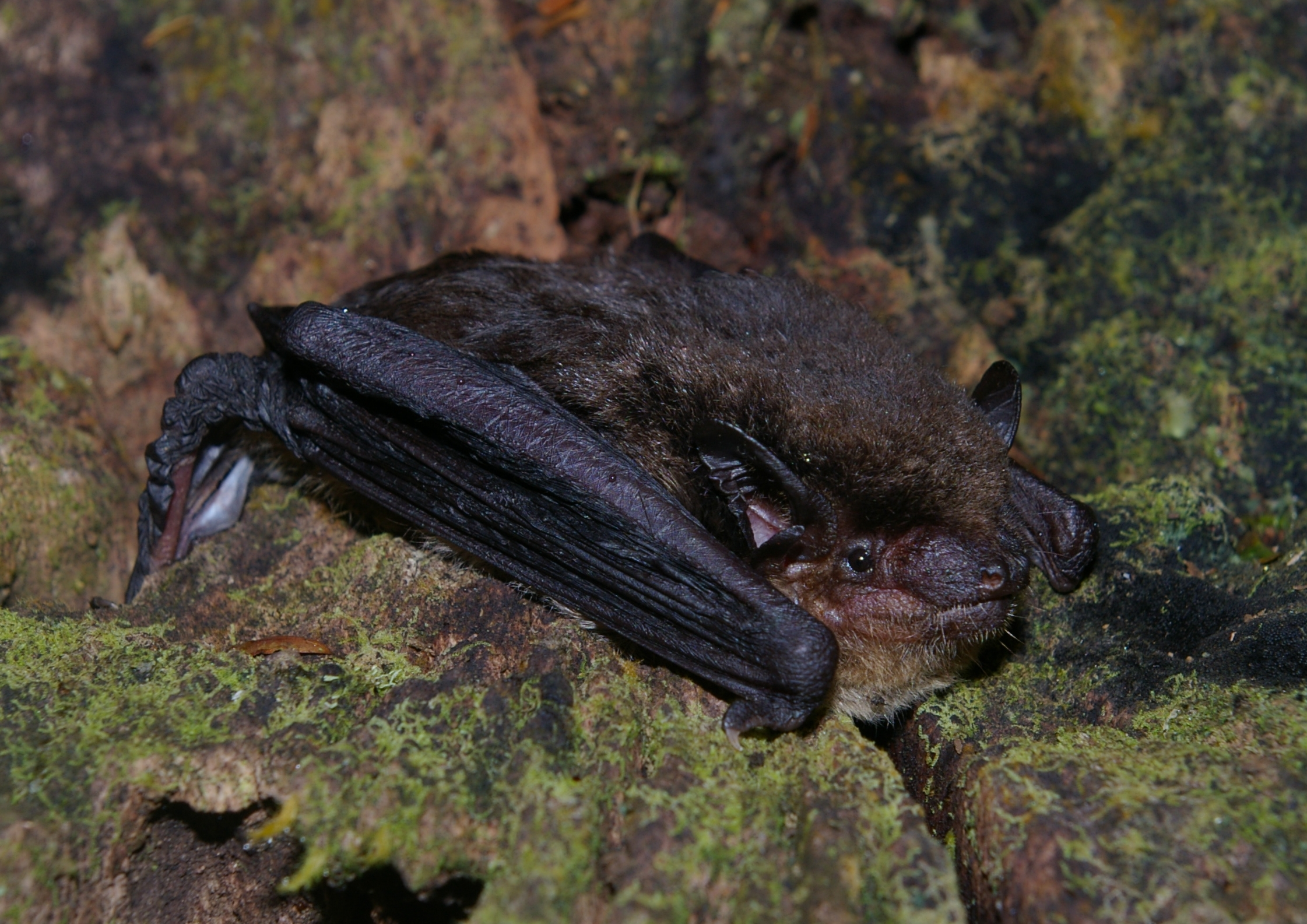
Argentine brown bat

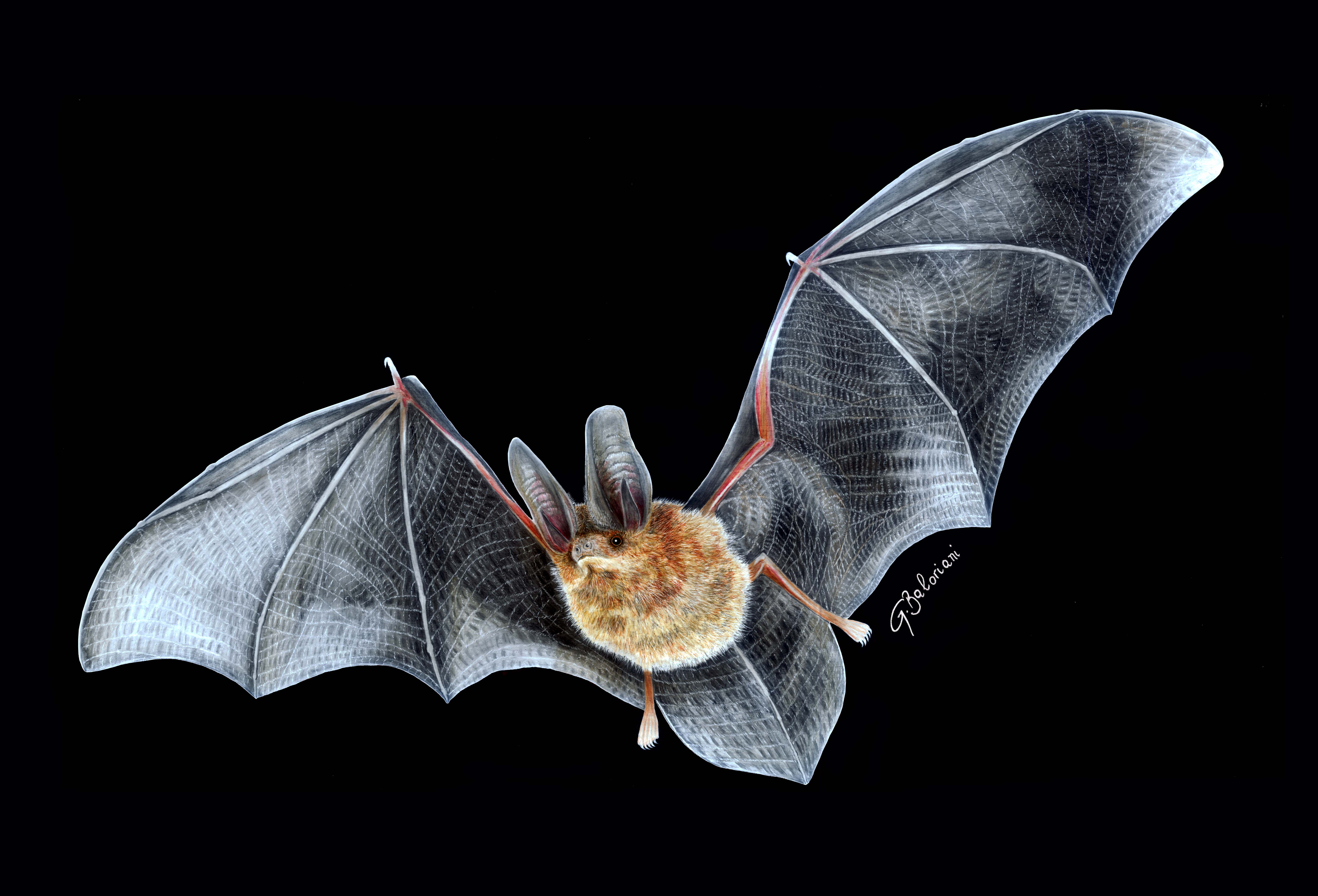
Small big-eared brown bat

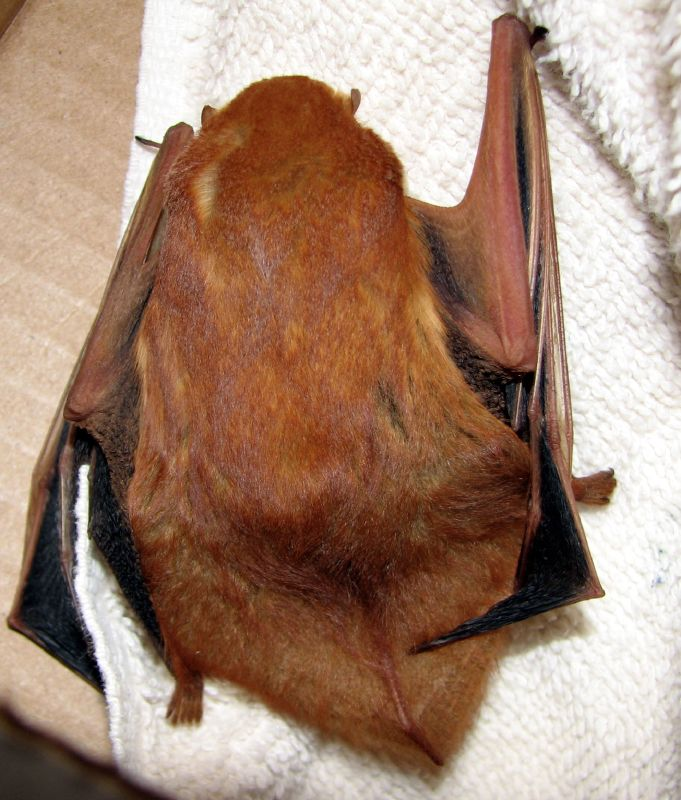
Desert red bat

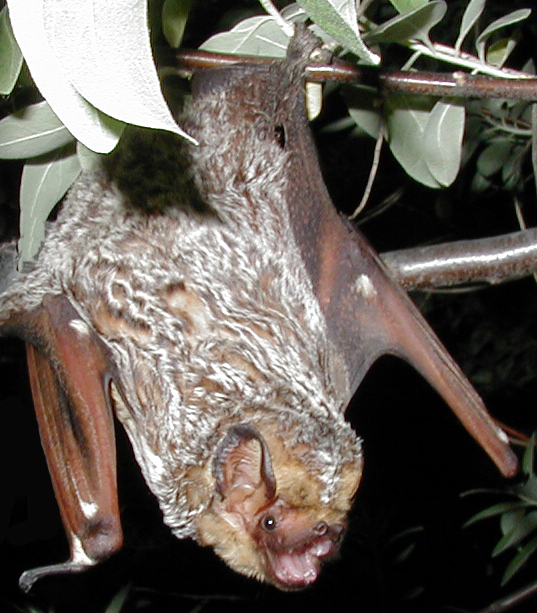
Hoary bat

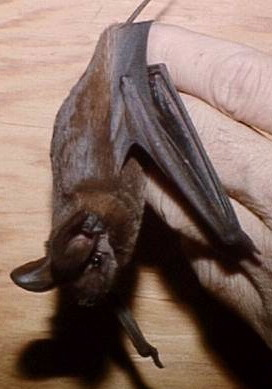
Big free-tailed bat

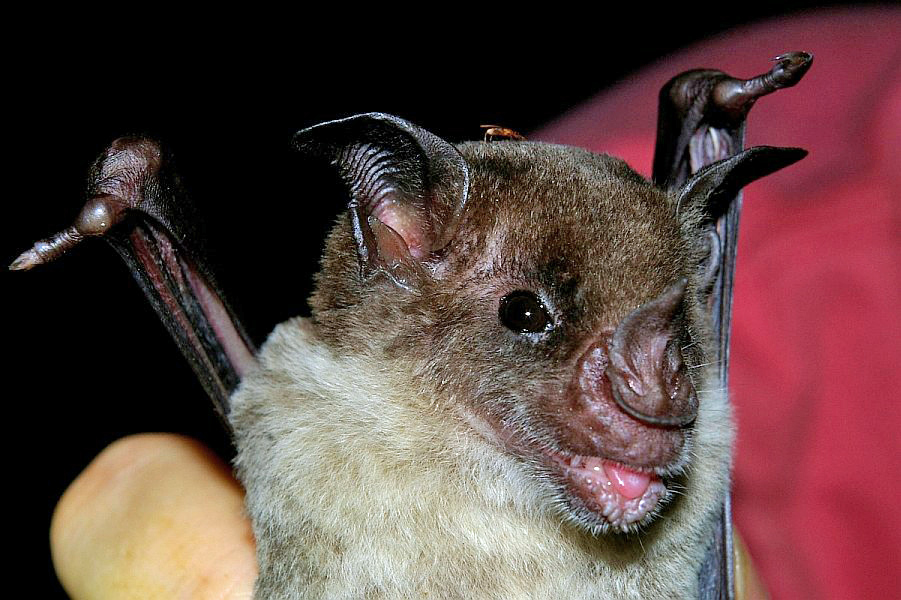
Pale spear-nosed bat

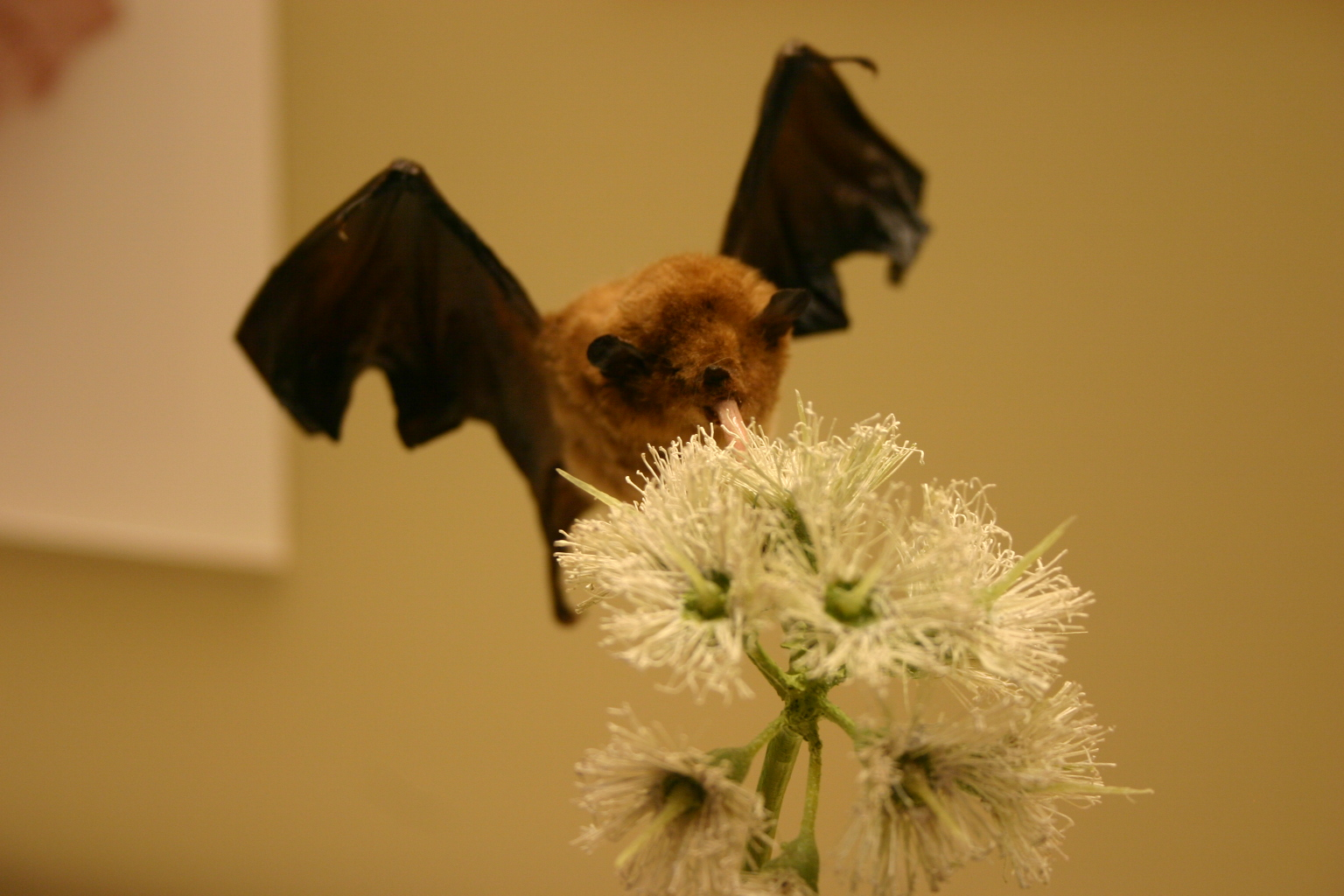
Pallas's long-tongued bat

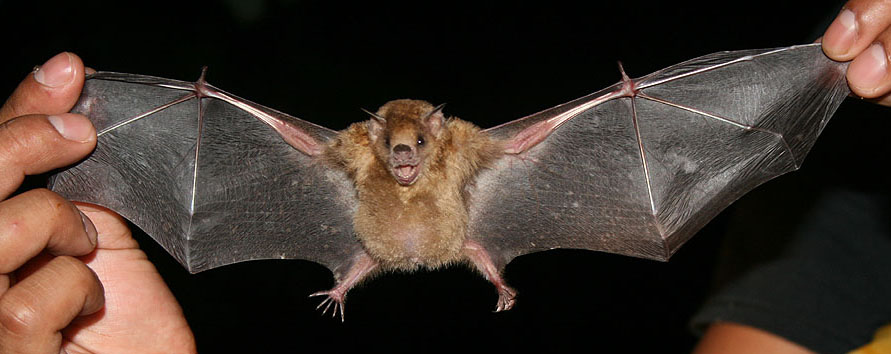
Little yellow-shouldered bat

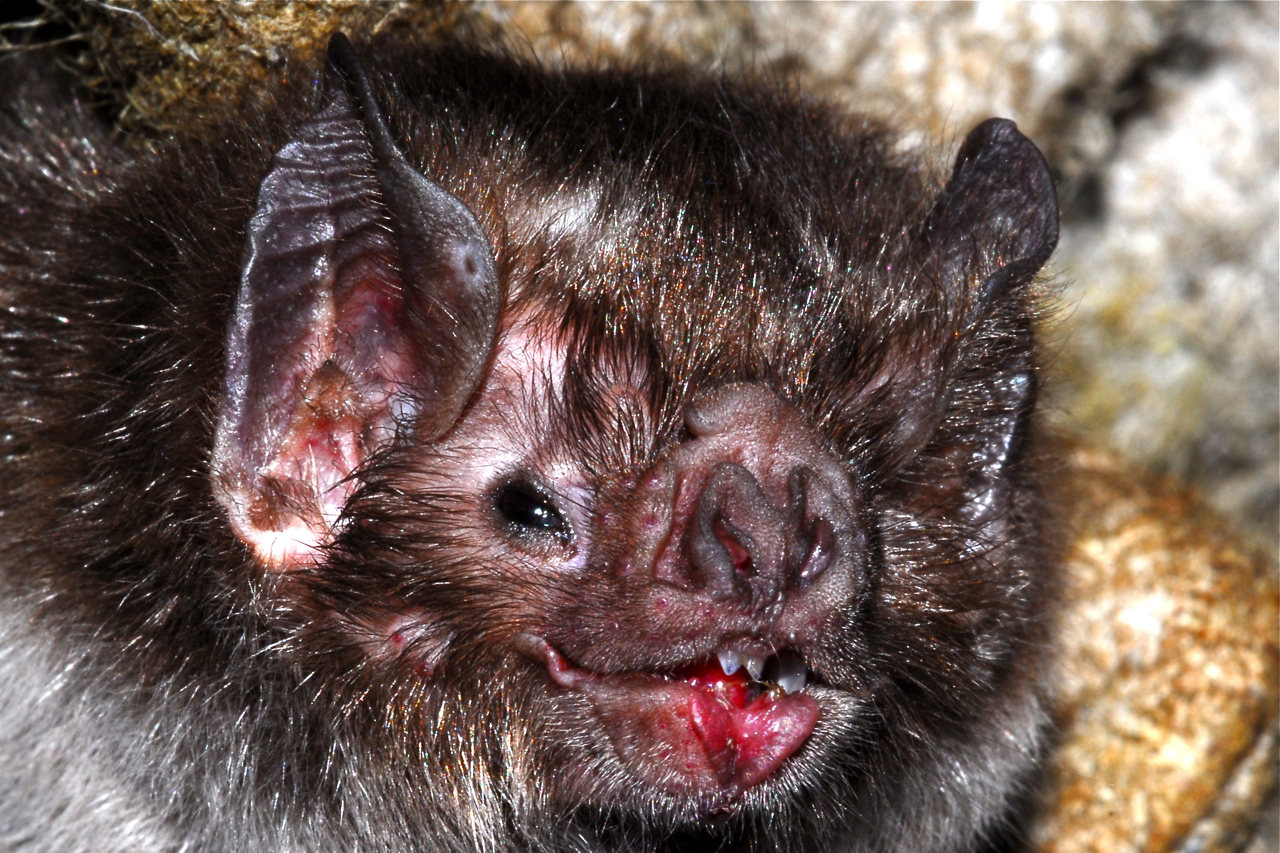
Common vampire bat

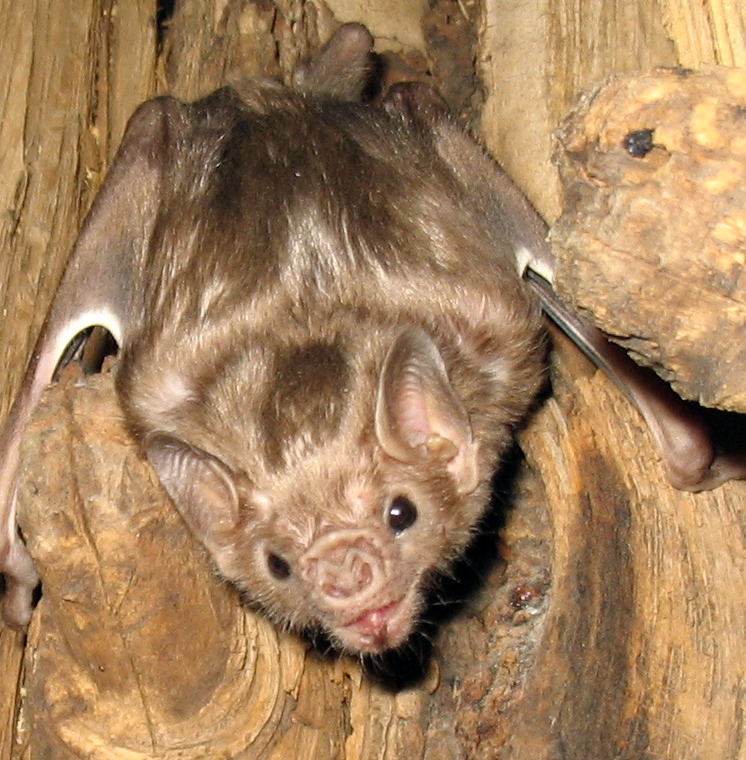
White-winged vampire bat

The bats' most distinguishing feature is that their forelimbs are developed as wings, making them the only mammals capable of flight. Bat species account for about 20% of all mammals.

- Family: Noctilionidae
  - Genus: Noctilio
    - Lesser bulldog bat, N. albiventris LC
    - Greater bulldog bat, N. leporinus LC
- Family: Vespertilionidae
  - Subfamily: Myotinae
    - Genus: Myotis
      - Southern myotis, Myotis aelleni DD
      - Silver-tipped myotis, Myotis albescens LC
      - Chilean myotis, Myotis chiloensis LC
      - Myotis dinellii LC
      - Hairy-legged myotis, Myotis keaysi LC
      - Yellowish myotis, Myotis levis LC
      - Black myotis, Myotis nigricans LC
      - Riparian myotis, Myotis riparius LC
      - Red myotis, Myotis ruber NT
      - Velvety myotis, Myotis simus DD
  - Subfamily: Vespertilioninae
    - Genus: Eptesicus
      - Brazilian brown bat, Eptesicus brasiliensis LC
      - Diminutive serotine, Eptesicus diminutus LC
      - Argentine brown bat, Eptesicus furinalis LC
    - Genus: Histiotus
      - Thomas's big-eared brown bat, Histiotus laephotis LC
      - Big-eared brown bat, Histiotus macrotus LC
      - Southern big-eared brown bat, Histiotus magellanicus LC
      - Small big-eared brown bat, Histiotus montanus LC
      - Tropical big-eared brown bat, Histiotus velatus DD
    - Genus: Lasiurus
      - Desert red bat, Lasiurus blossevillii LC
      - Hoary bat, Lasiurus cinereus LC
      - Southern yellow bat, Lasiurus ega LC
      - Cinnamon red bat, Lasiurus varius LC
- Family: Molossidae
  - Genus: Cynomops
    - Cinnamon dog-faced bat, Cynomops abrasus DD
    - Para dog-faced bat, Cynomops paranus DD
    - Southern dog-faced bat, Cynomops planirostris LC
  - Genus: Eumops
    - Black bonneted bat, Eumops auripendulus LC
    - Dwarf bonneted bat, Eumops bonariensis LC
    - Big bonneted bat, Eumops dabbenei LC
    - Wagner's bonneted bat, Eumops glaucinus LC
    - Patagonian bonneted bat, Eumops patagonicus LC
    - Western mastiff bat, Eumops perotis LC
  - Genus: Molossops
    - Rufous dog-faced bat, Molossops neglectus DD
    - Dwarf dog-faced bat, Molossops temminckii LC
  - Genus: Molossus
    - Bonda mastiff bat, Molossus currentium LC
    - Velvety free-tailed bat, Molossus molossus LC
    - Black mastiff bat, Molossus rufus LC
  - Genus: Nyctinomops
    - Broad-eared bat, Nyctinomops laticaudatus LC
    - Big free-tailed bat, Nyctinomops macrotis LC
  - Genus: Promops
    - Big crested mastiff bat, Promops centralis LC
    - Brown mastiff bat, Promops nasutus LC
  - Genus: Tadarida
    - Mexican free-tailed bat, Tadarida brasiliensis LC
- Family: Phyllostomidae
  - Subfamily: Phyllostominae
    - Genus: Chrotopterus
      - Big-eared woolly bat, Chrotopterus auritus LC
    - Genus: Macrophyllum
      - Long-legged bat, Macrophyllum macrophyllum LC
    - Genus: Phyllostomus
      - Pale spear-nosed bat, Phyllostomus discolor LC
    - Genus: Tonatia
      - Greater round-eared bat, Tonatia bidens DD
  - Subfamily: Glossophaginae
    - Genus: Anoura
      - Tailed tailless bat, Anoura caudifer LC
    - Genus: Glossophaga
      - Pallas's long-tongued bat, Glossophaga soricina LC
  - Subfamily: Carolliinae
    - Genus: Carollia
      - Seba's short-tailed bat, Carollia perspicillata LC
  - Subfamily: Stenodermatinae
    - Genus: Artibeus
      - Fringed fruit-eating bat, Artibeus fimbriatus LC
      - Great fruit-eating bat, Artibeus lituratus LC
      - Flat-faced fruit-eating bat, Artibeus planirostris LC
    - Genus: Platyrrhinus
      - White-lined broad-nosed bat, Platyrrhinus lineatus LC
    - Genus: Pygoderma
      - Ipanema bat, Pygoderma bilabiatum LC
    - Genus: Sturnira
      - Hairy yellow-shouldered bat, Sturnira erythromos LC
      - Little yellow-shouldered bat, Sturnira lilium LC
      - Tschudi's yellow-shouldered bat, Sturnira oporaphilum LC
    - Genus: Vampyressa
      - Southern little yellow-eared bat, Vampyressa pusilla DD
  - Subfamily: Desmodontinae
    - Genus: Desmodus
      - Common vampire bat, Desmodus rotundus LC
    - Genus: Diaemus
      - White-winged vampire bat, Diaemus youngi LC

===== Order: Carnivora (carnivorans) =====
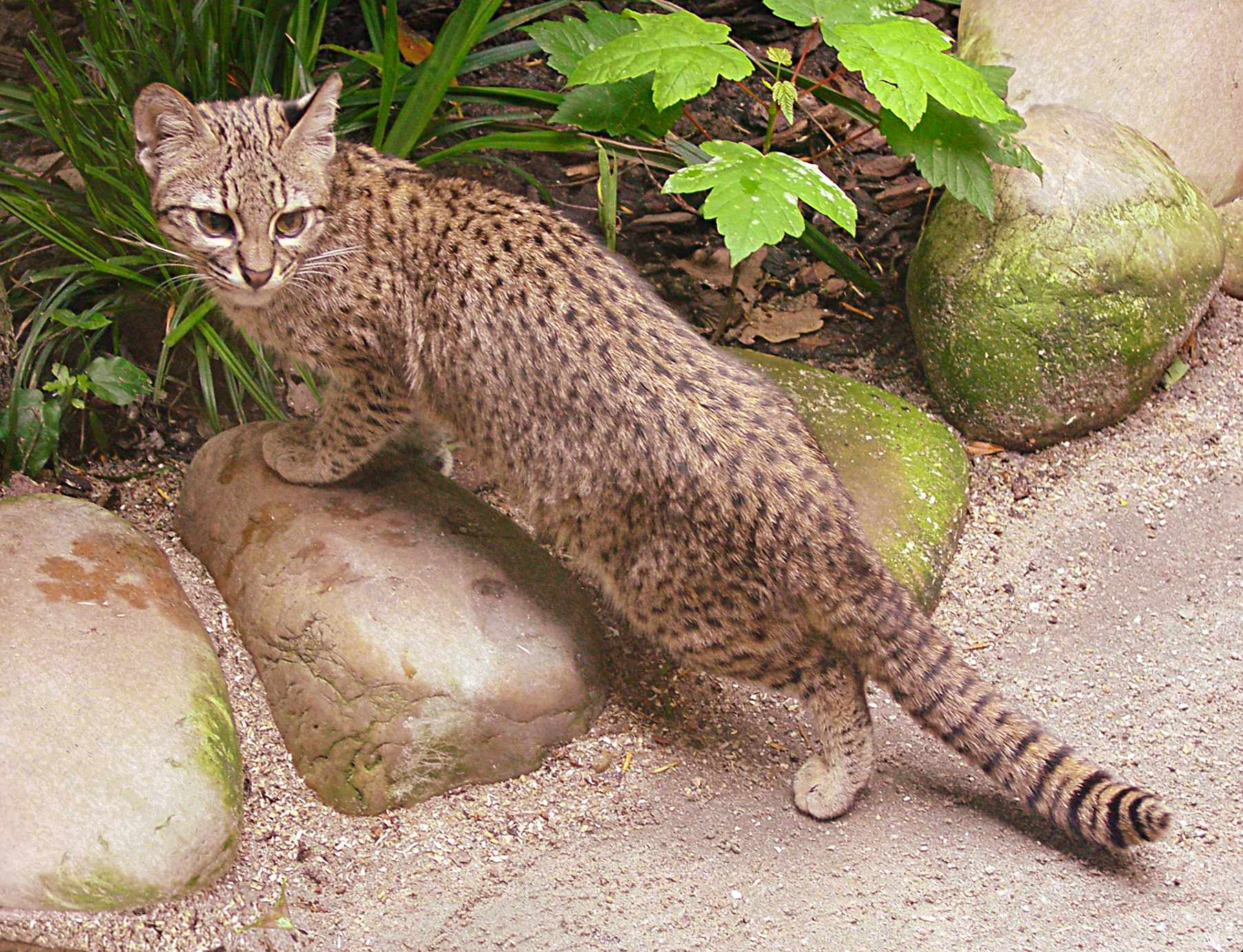
Geoffroy's cat

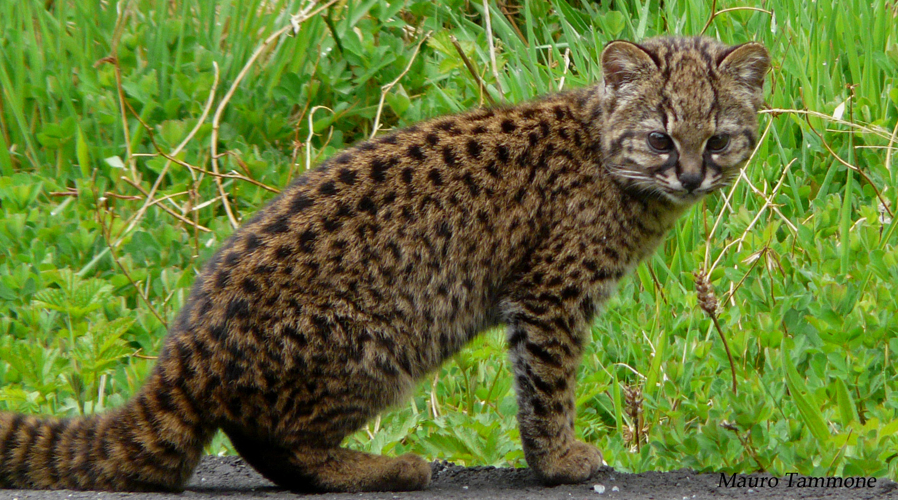
Kodkod

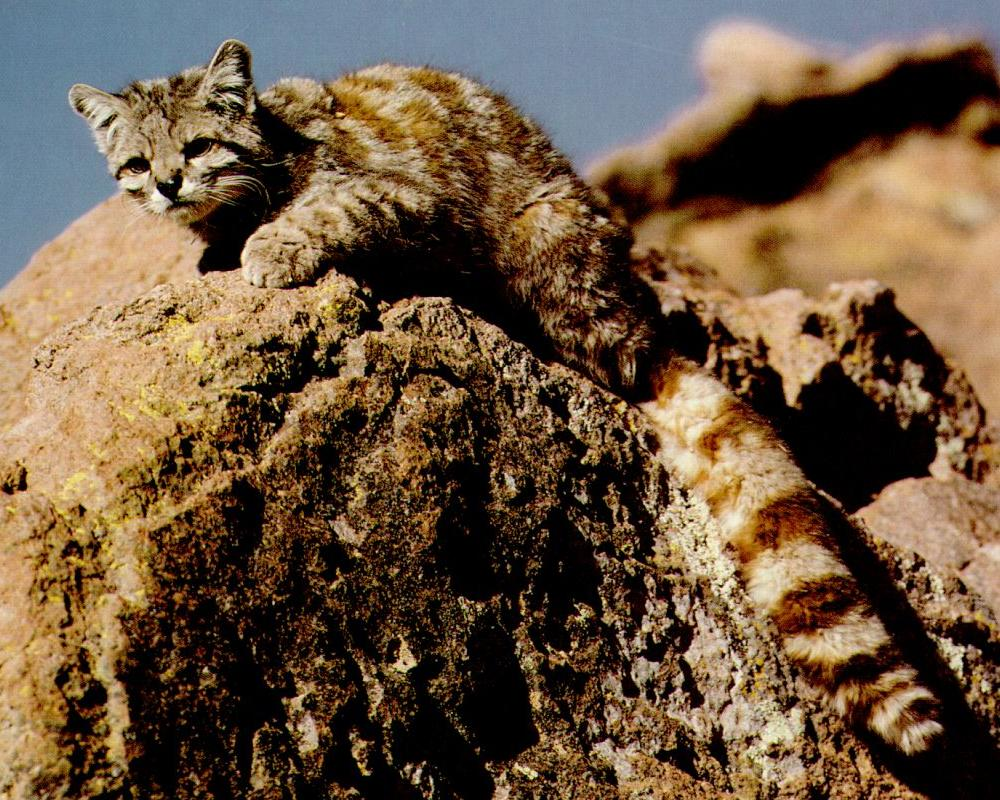
Andean mountain cat

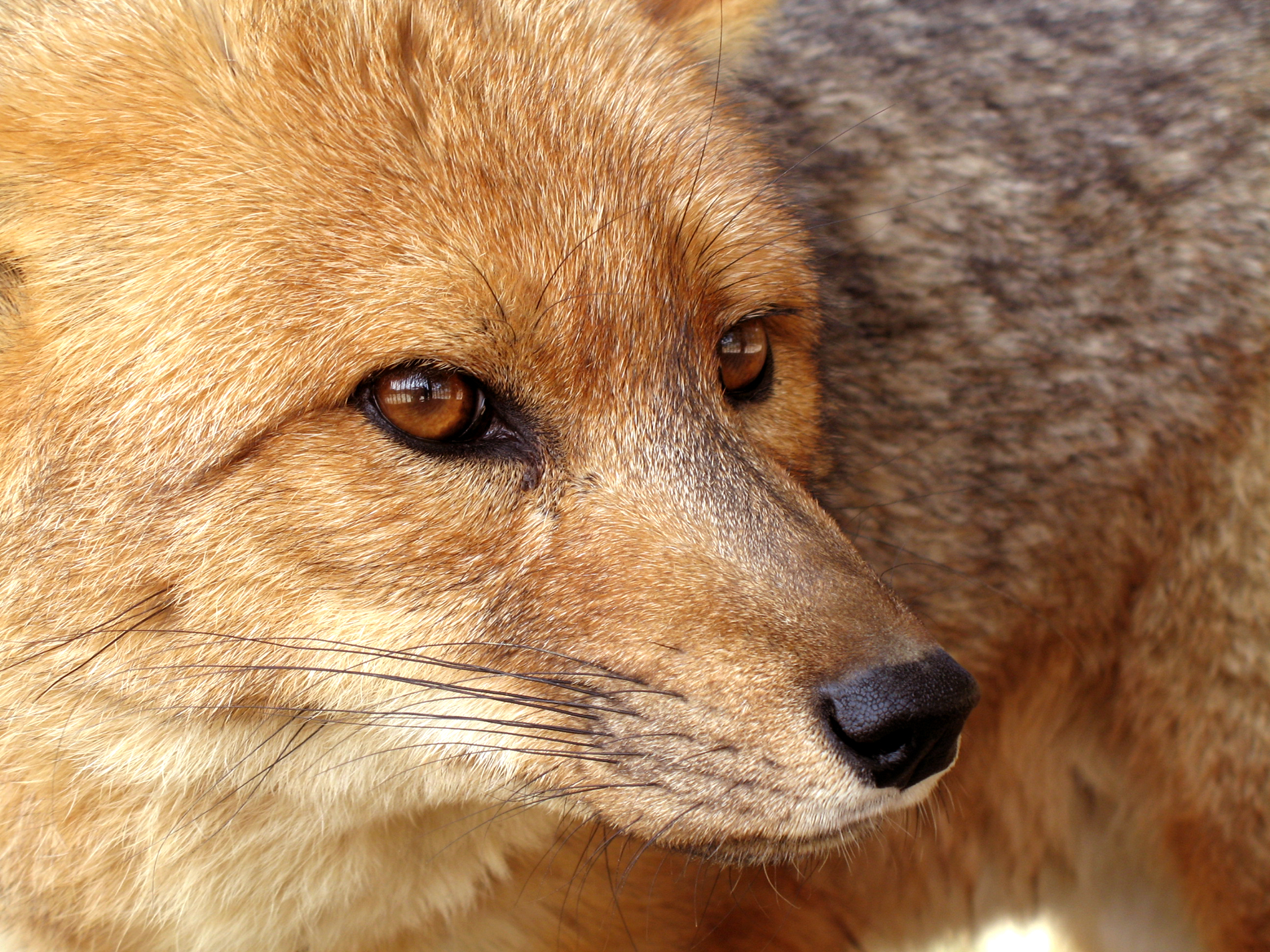
Culpeo

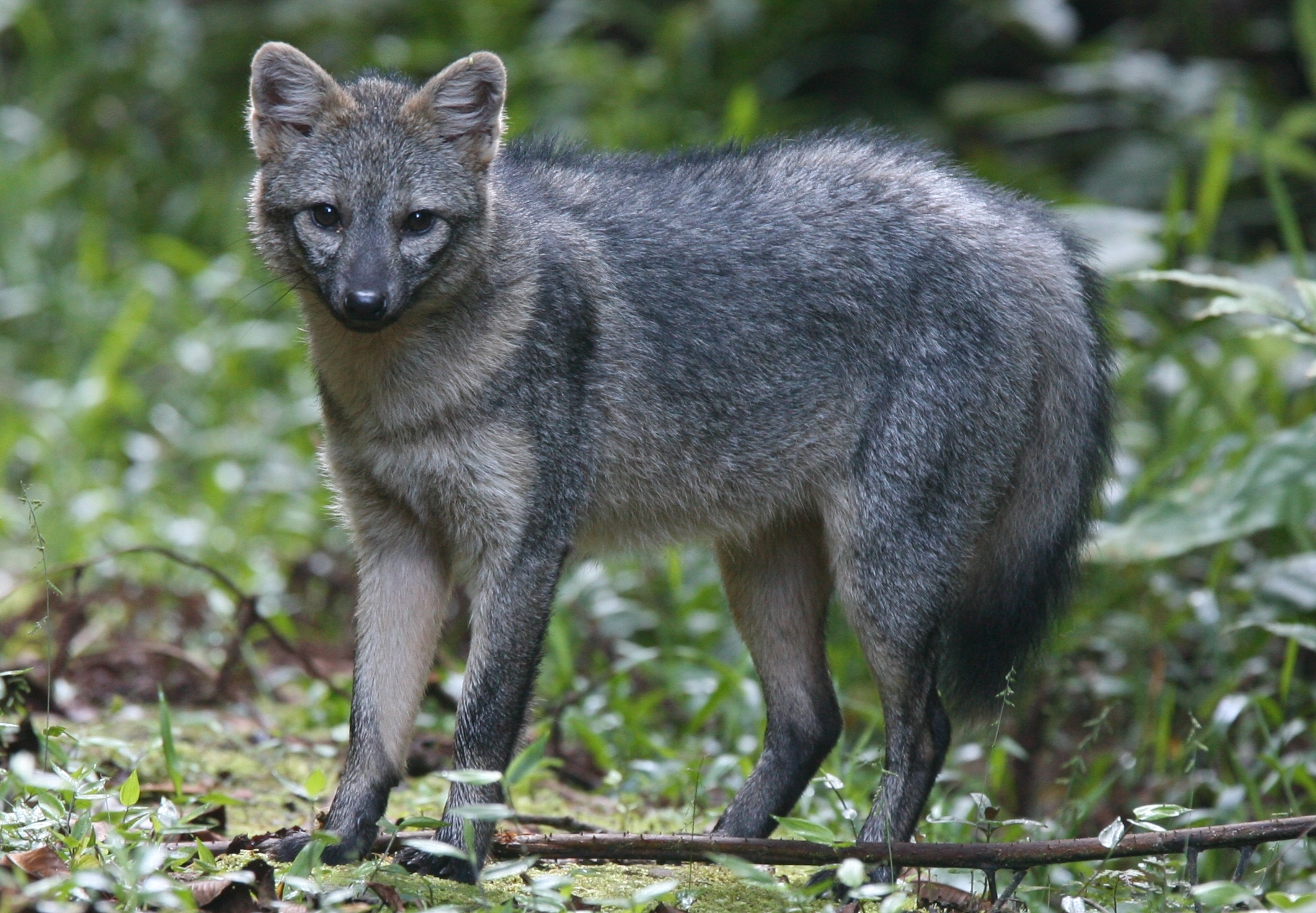
Crab-eating fox

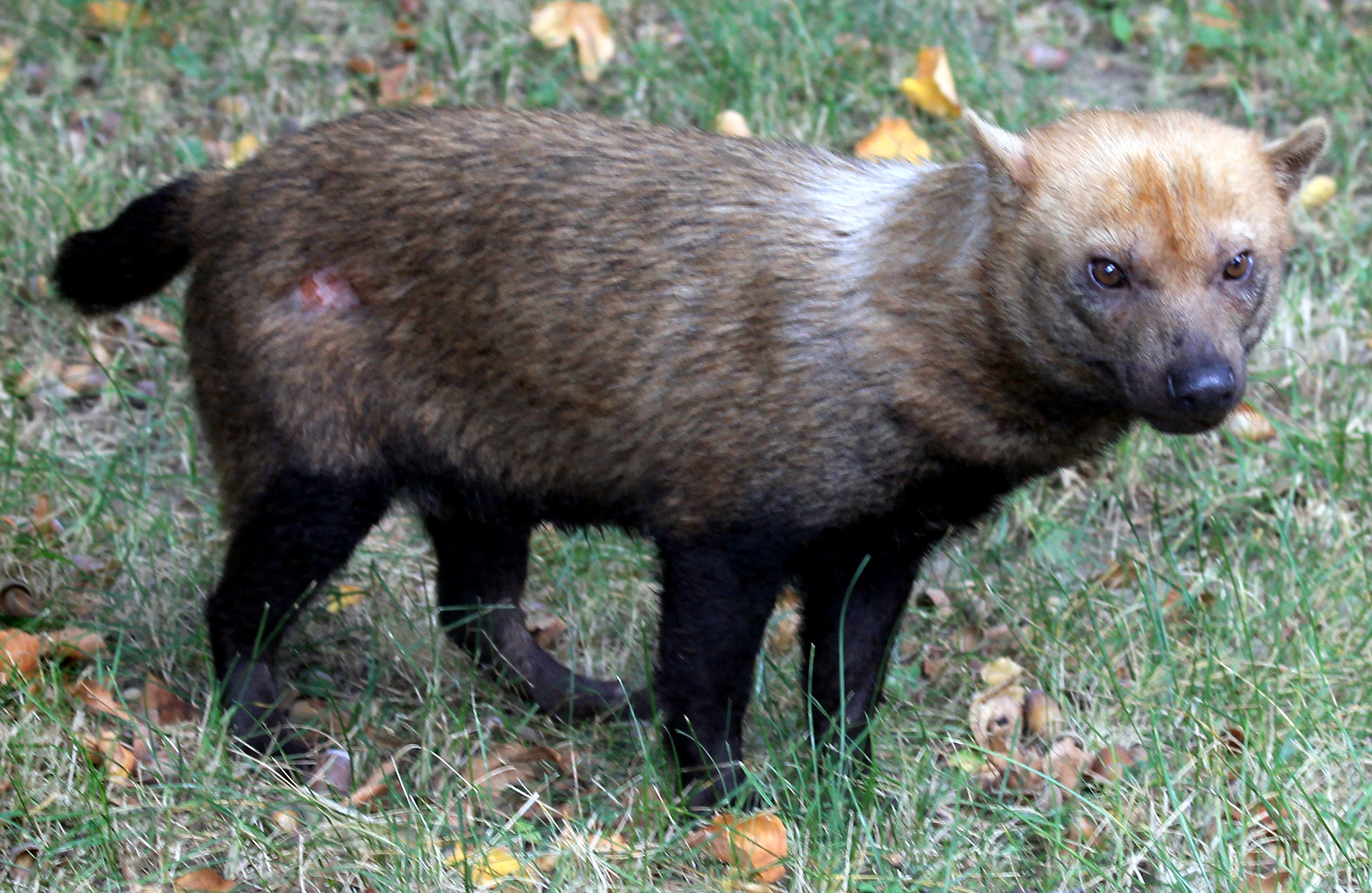
Bush dog

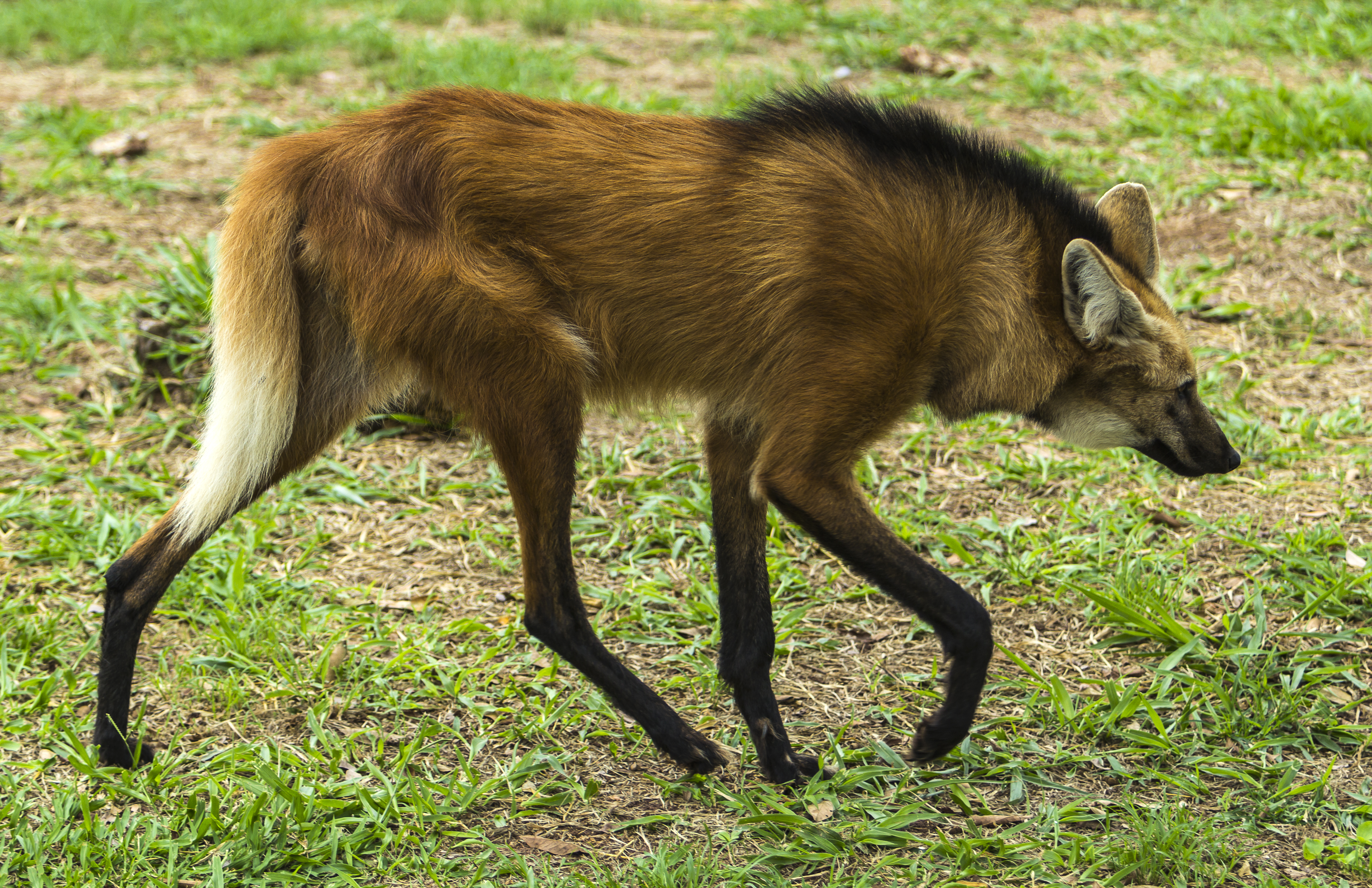
Maned wolf

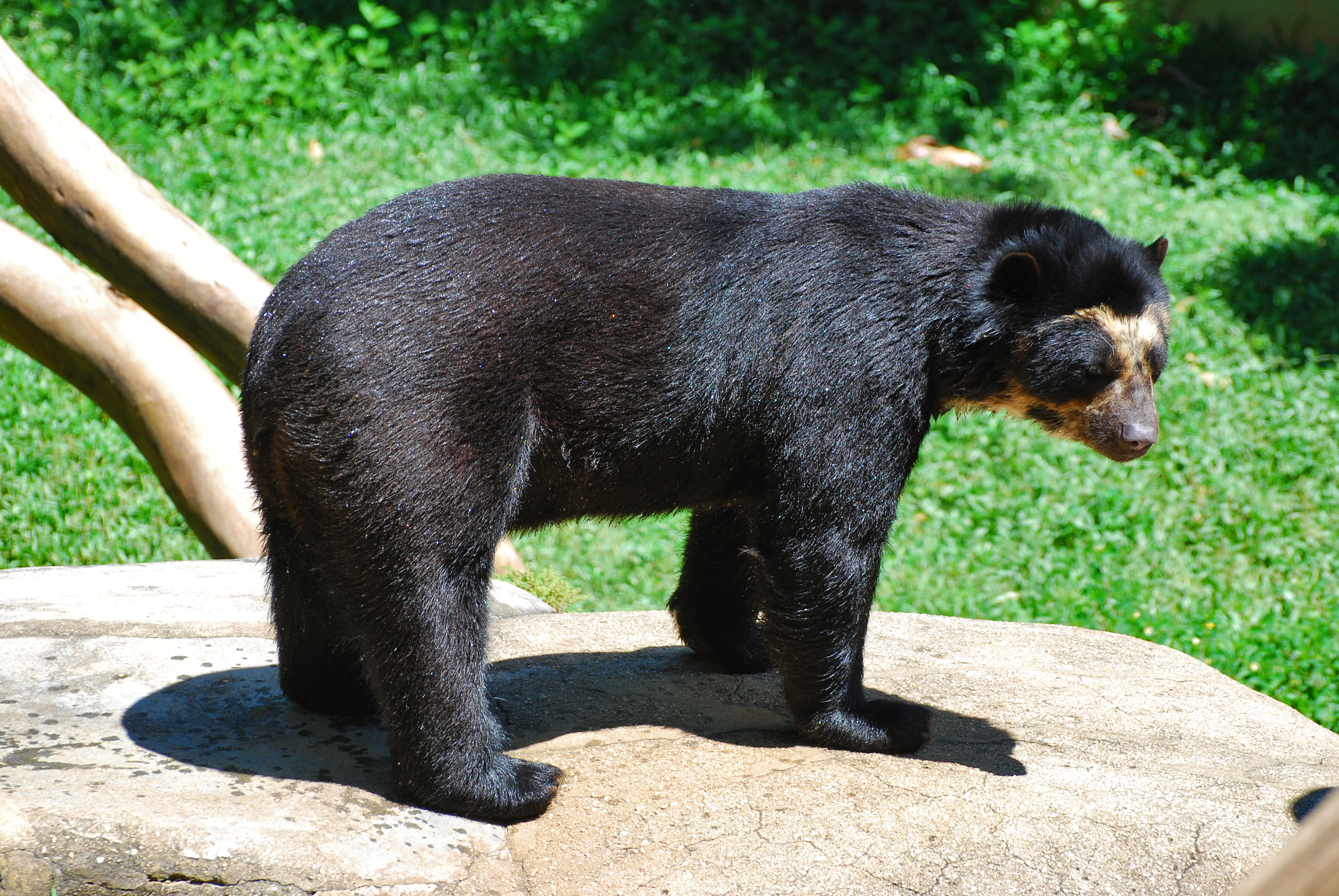
Spectacled bear

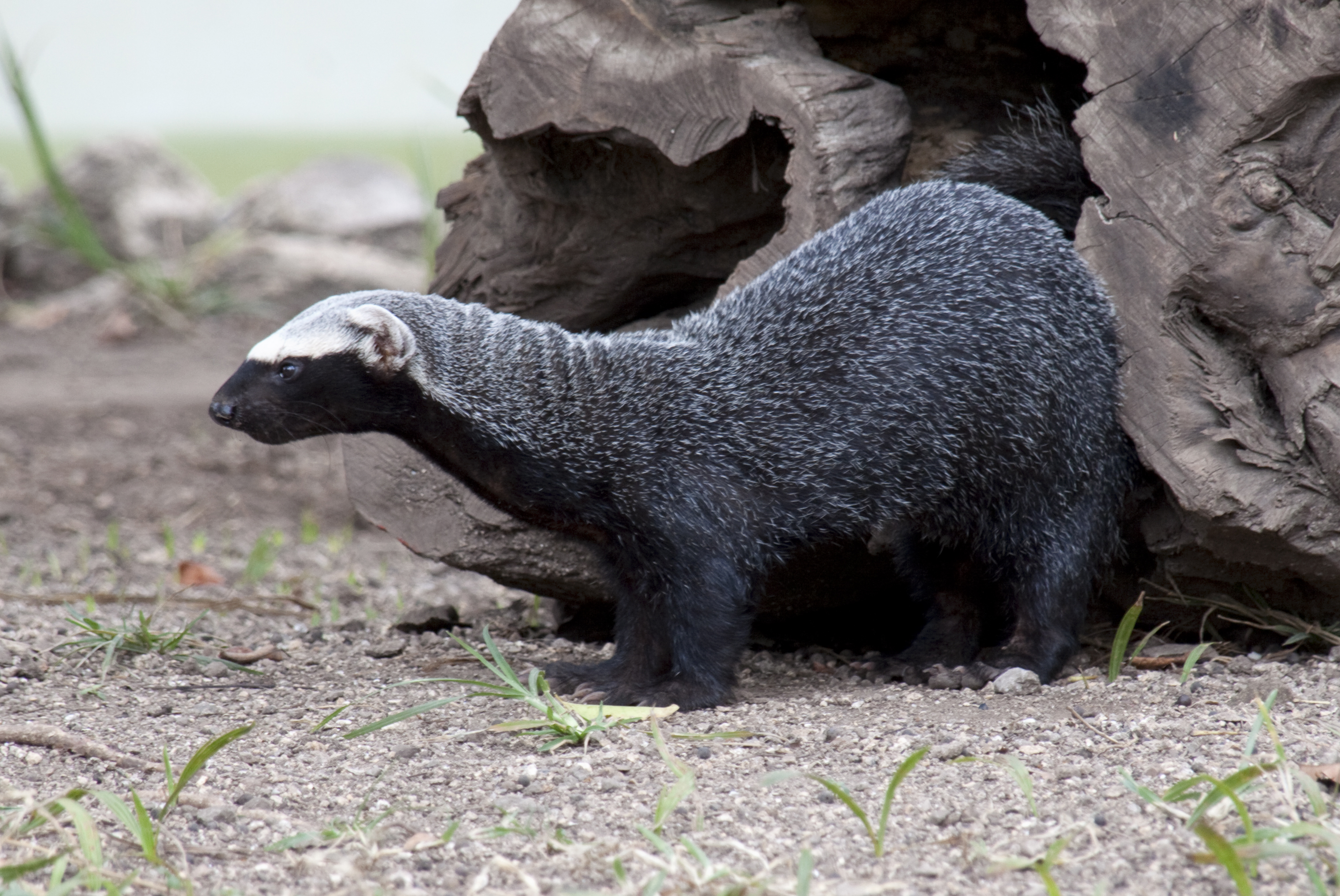
Greater grison

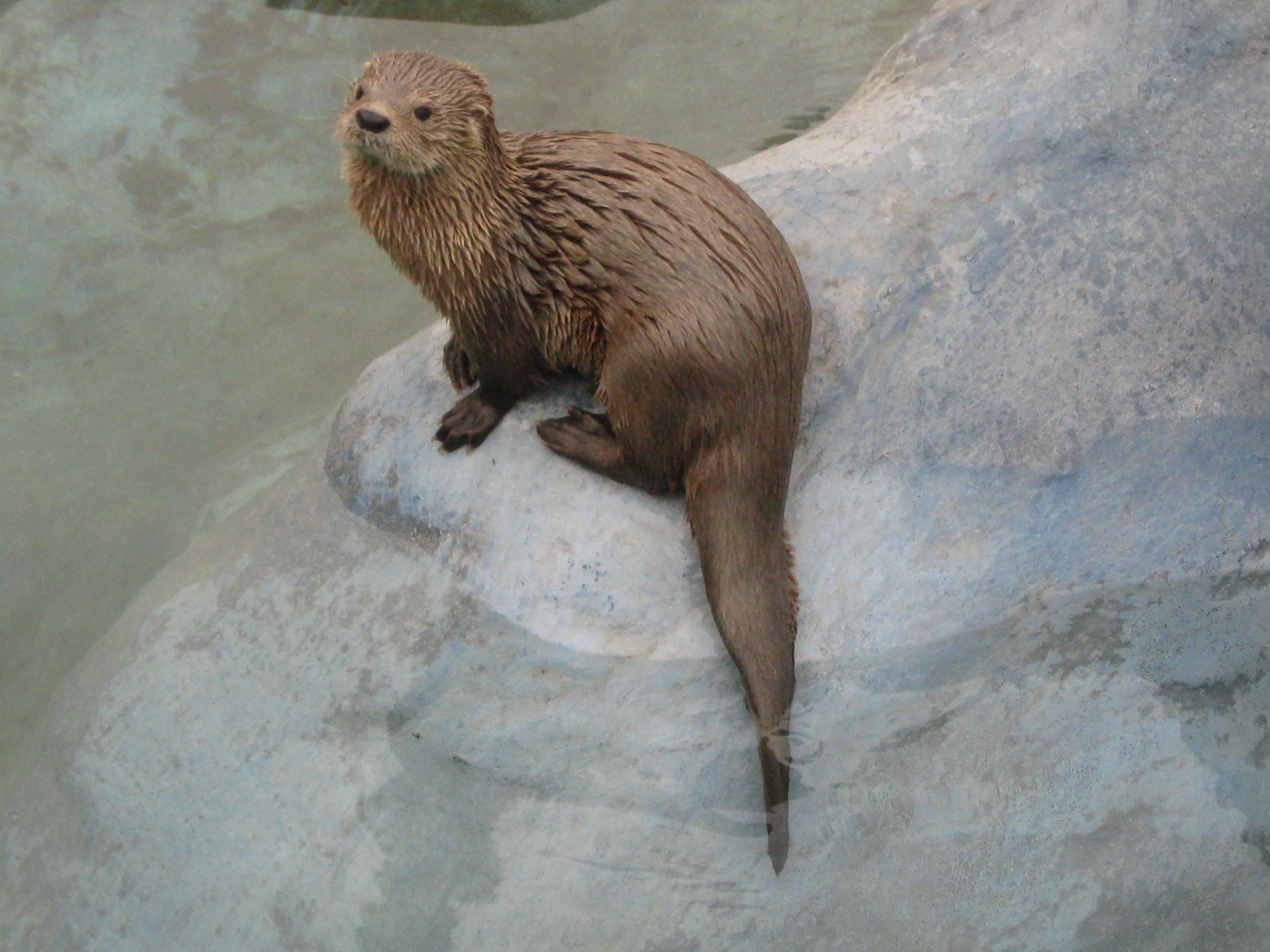
Marine otter

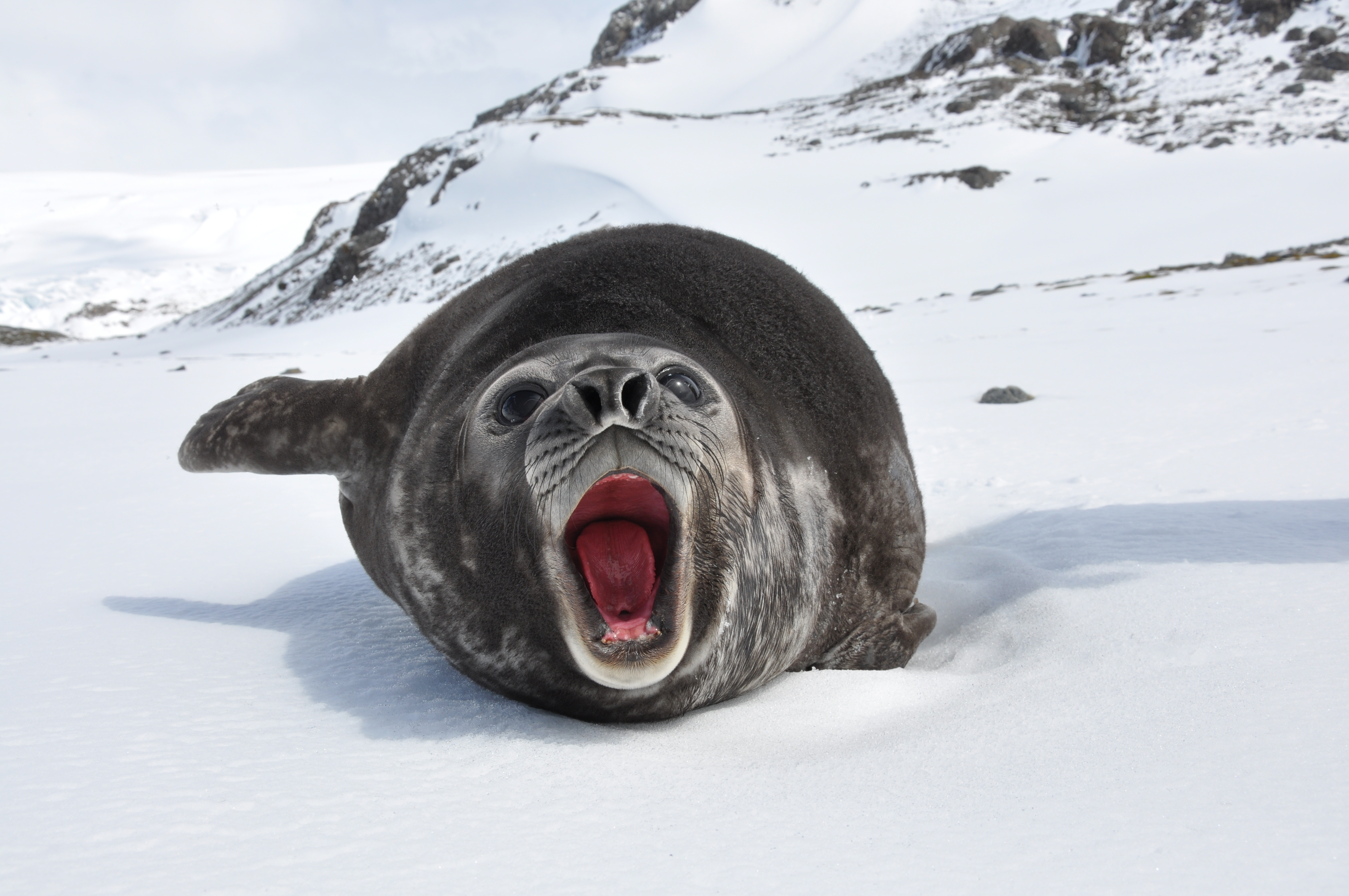
Juvenile southern elephant seal

There are over 260 species of carnivorans, the majority of which feed primarily on meat. They have a characteristic skull shape and dentition.

- Suborder: Feliformia
  - Family: Felidae (cats)
    - Subfamily: Felinae
      - Genus: Herpailurus
        - Jaguarundi, H. yagouaroundi LC
      - Genus: Leopardus
        - Pampas cat L. colocola NT
        - Geoffroy's cat L. geoffroyi LC
        - Kodkod, L. guigna VU
        - Southern tigrina L. guttulus VU
        - Andean mountain cat L. jacobitus EN
        - Ocelot L. pardalis LC
        - Oncilla L. tigrinus VU
        - Margay L. wiedii NT
      - Genus: Puma
        - Cougar, P. concolor LC
    - Subfamily: Pantherinae
      - Genus: Panthera
        - Jaguar, P. onca NT
- Suborder: Caniformia
  - Family: Canidae (dogs, foxes)
    - Genus: Dusicyon
      - Dusicyon avus EX
    - Genus: Lycalopex
      - Culpeo, Lycalopex culpaeus LC
      - South American gray fox, Lycalopex griseus LC
      - Pampas fox, Lycalopex gymnocercus LC
    - Genus: Cerdocyon
      - Crab-eating fox, Cerdocyon thous LC
    - Genus: Speothos
      - Bush dog, Speothos venaticus NT
    - Genus: Chrysocyon
      - Maned wolf, Chrysocyon brachyurus NT
  - Family: Ursidae (bears)
    - Genus: Tremarctos
      - Spectacled bear, Tremarctos ornatus VU presence uncertain, possible vagrant
  - Family: Procyonidae (raccoons)
    - Genus: Procyon
      - Crab-eating raccoon, Procyon cancrivorus LC
    - Genus: Nasua
      - South American coati, Nasua nasua LC
  - Family: Mustelidae (mustelids)
    - Genus: Eira
      - Tayra, Eira barbara LC
    - Genus: Galictis
      - Lesser grison, Galictis cuja LC
      - Greater grison, Galictis vittata LC
    - Genus: Lyncodon
      - Patagonian weasel, Lyncodon patagonicus LC
    - Genus: Lontra
      - Marine otter, Lontra felina EN
      - Neotropical river otter, Lontra longicaudis NT
      - Southern river otter, Lontra provocax EN
    - Genus: Neogale
      - American mink, N. vison LC introduced
    - Genus: Pteronura
      - Giant otter, Pteronura brasiliensis EN presence uncertain
  - Family: Mephitidae
    - Genus: Conepatus
      - Molina's hog-nosed skunk, Conepatus chinga LC
      - Humboldt's hog-nosed skunk, Conepatus humboldtii LC
  - Clade: Pinnipedia (seals, sea lions, walruses)
    - Family: Otariidae (eared seals, sea lions)
      - Genus: Arctocephalus
        - South American fur seal, Arctocephalus australis LC
        - Subantarctic fur seal, Arctocephalus tropicalis LC
      - Genus: Otaria
        - South American sea lion, Otaria flavescens LC
    - Family: Phocidae (earless seals)
      - Genus: Leptonychotes
        - Weddell seal, Leptonychotes weddellii LC
      - Genus: Lobodon
        - Crabeater seal, Lobodon carcinophaga LC
      - Genus: Mirounga
        - Southern elephant seal, Mirounga leonina LC

===== Order: Perissodactyla (odd-toed ungulates) =====
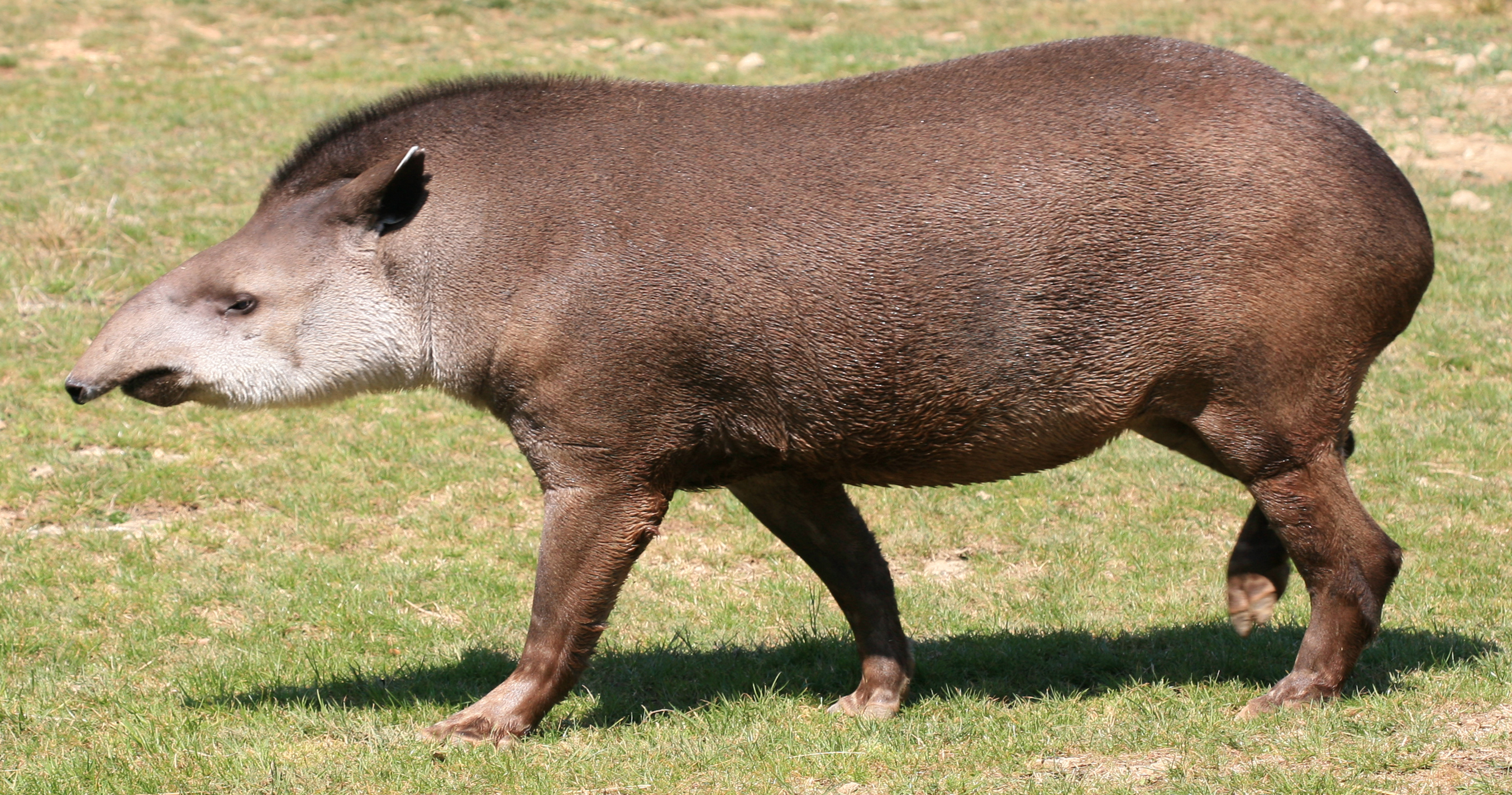
Lowland tapir

The odd-toed ungulates are browsing and grazing mammals. They are usually large to very large, and have relatively simple stomachs and a large middle toe. South America once had a great diversity of ungulates of native origin, but these dwindled after the interchange with North America, and disappeared entirely following the arrival of humans. Sequencing of collagen from fossils of one recently extinct species each of notoungulates and litopterns has indicated that these orders comprise a sister group to the perissodactyls.

- Family: Tapiridae (tapirs)
  - Genus: Tapirus
    - Lowland tapir, Tapirus terrestris VU

===== Order: Artiodactyla (even-toed ungulates and cetaceans) =====
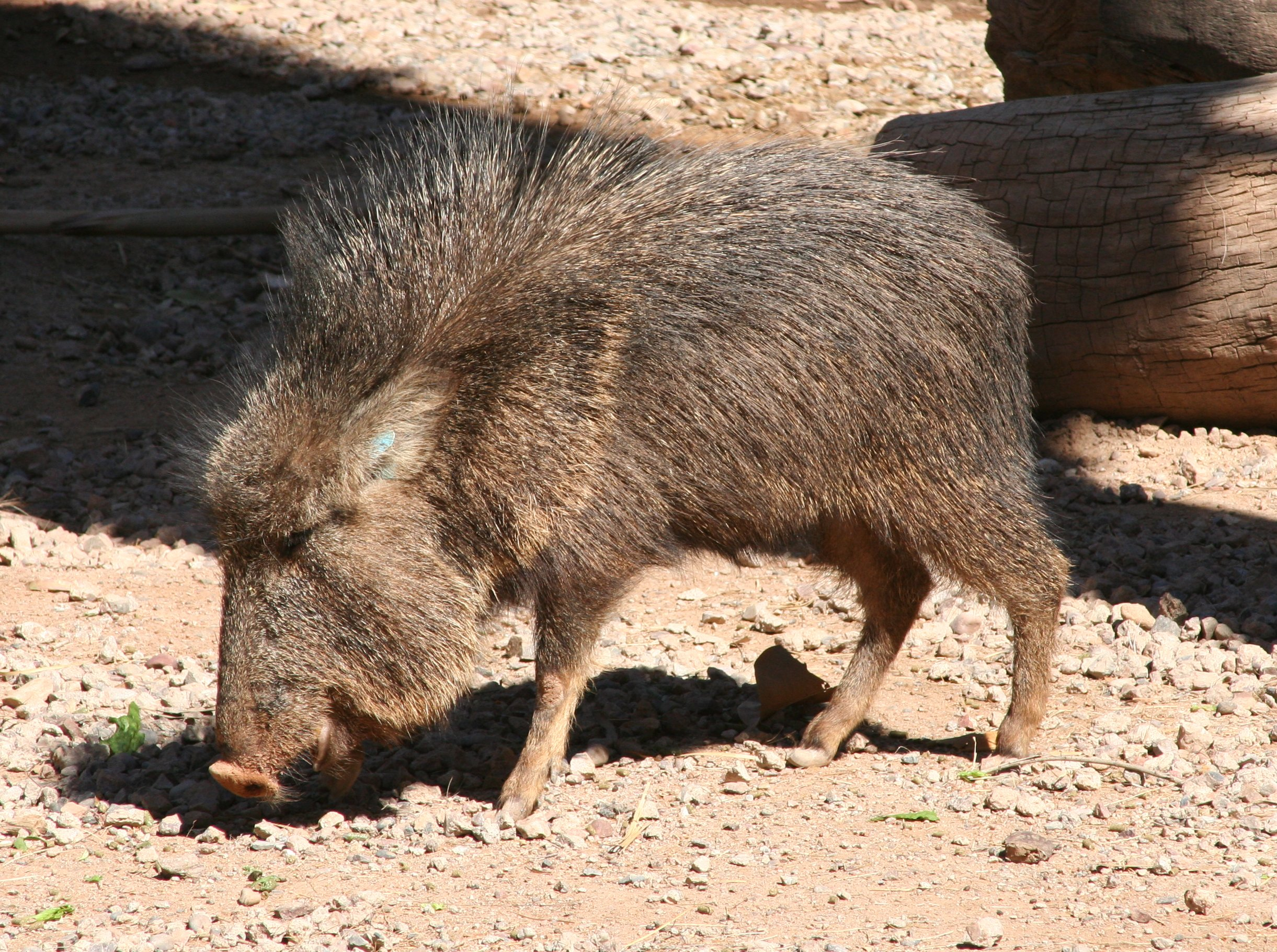
Chacoan peccary

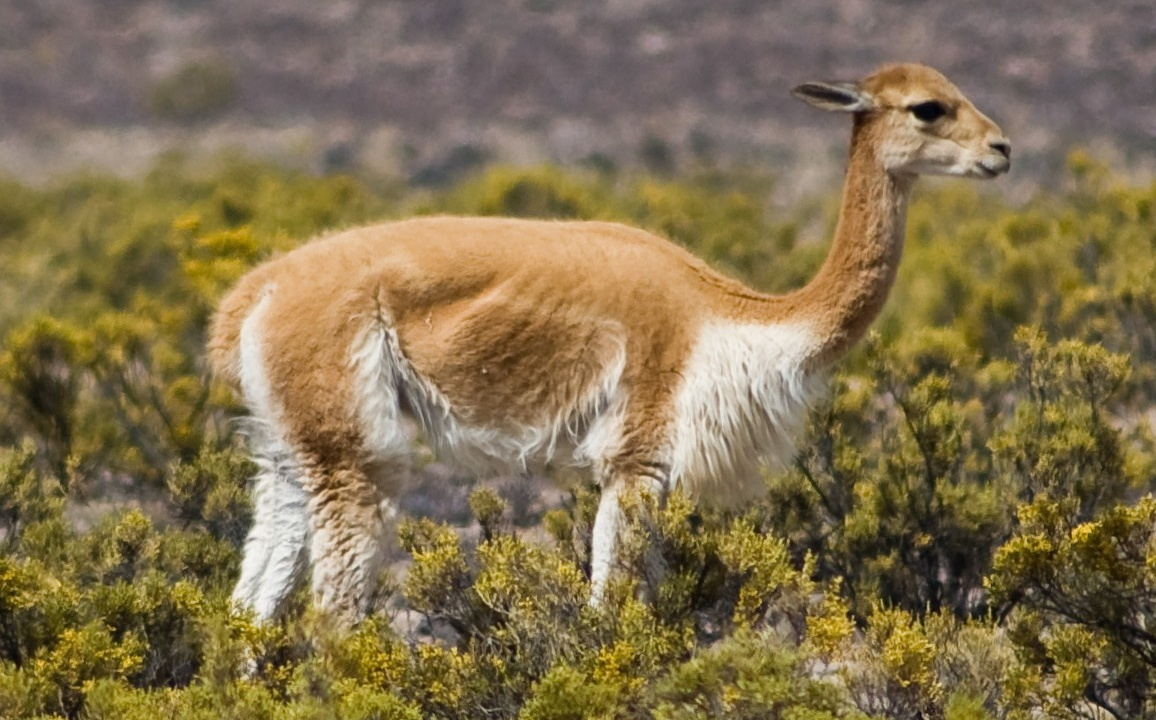
Vicuña

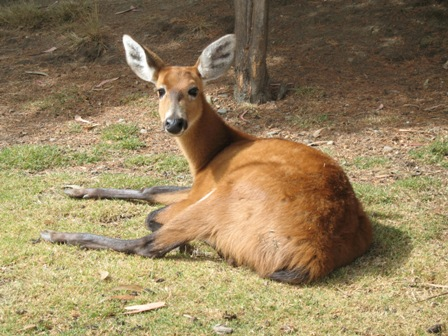
Marsh deer

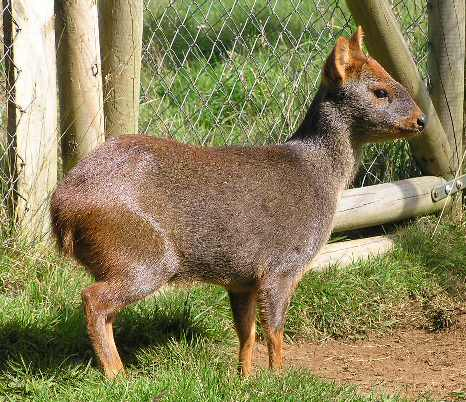
Southern pudú

The weight of even-toed ungulates is borne about equally by the third and fourth toes, rather than mostly or entirely by the third as in perissodactyls. There are about 220 noncetacean artiodactyl species, including many that are of great economic importance to humans.

- Family: Bovidae (bovids)
  - Subfamily: Antilopinae
    - Genus: Antilope
      - Blackbuck, A. cervicapra LC introduced
  - Subfamily: Caprinae
    - Genus: Hemitragus
      - Himalayan tahr, H. jemlahicus NT introduced, possibly extirpated
- Family: Tayassuidae (peccaries)
  - Genus: Catagonus
    - Chacoan peccary, Catagonus wagneri EN
  - Genus: Dicotyles
    - Collared peccary, Dicotyles tajacu LC
  - Genus: Tayassu
    - White-lipped peccary, Tayassu pecari VU
- Family: Camelidae (camels, llamas)
  - Genus: Lama
    - Guanaco, Lama guanicoe LC
    - Vicuña, Lama vicugna LC
- Family: Cervidae (deer)
  - Subfamily: Capreolinae
    - Genus: Blastocerus
      - Marsh deer, Blastocerus dichotomus VU
    - Genus: Hippocamelus
      - Taruca, Hippocamelus antisensis VU
      - South Andean deer, Hippocamelus bisulcus EN
    - Genus: Mazama
      - Red brocket, Mazama americana DD
      - Gray brocket, Mazama gouazoupira LC
      - Pygmy brocket, Mazama nana VU
    - Genus: Odocoileus
      - Mule deer, O. hemionus LC introduced
    - Genus: Ozotoceros
      - Pampas deer, Ozotoceros bezoarticus NT
    - Genus: Pudú
      - Southern pudú, P. puda NT
  - Subfamily: Cervinae
    - Genus: Cervus
      - Red deer, C. elaphus LC introduced
    - Genus: Dama
      - European fallow deer, D. dama LC introduced

===== Order: Cetacea (whales, dolphins and porpoises) =====
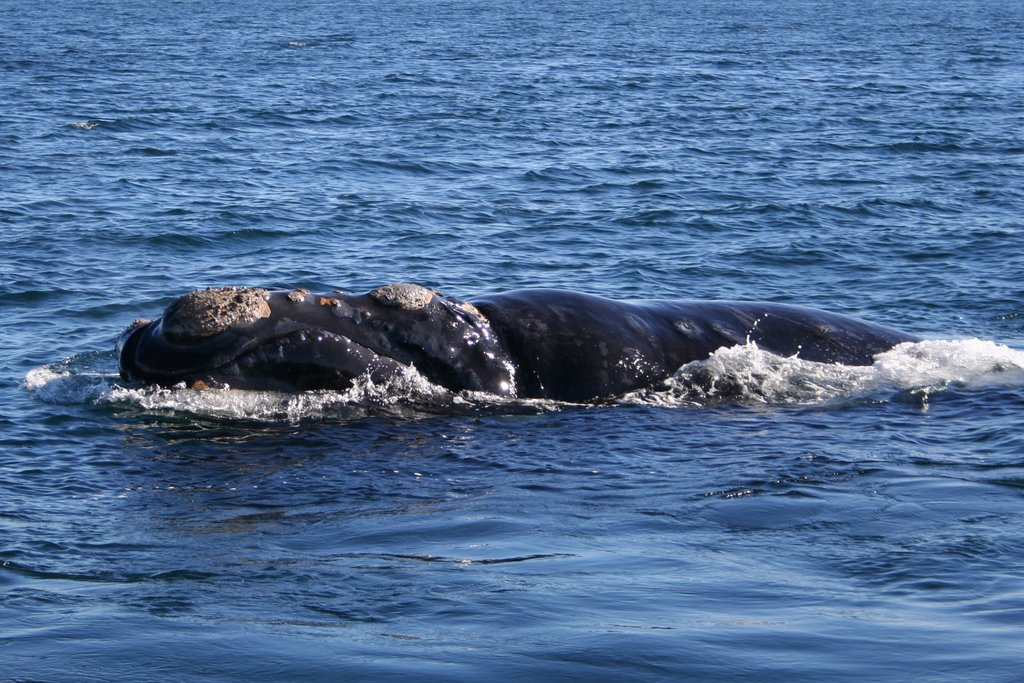
Southern right whale

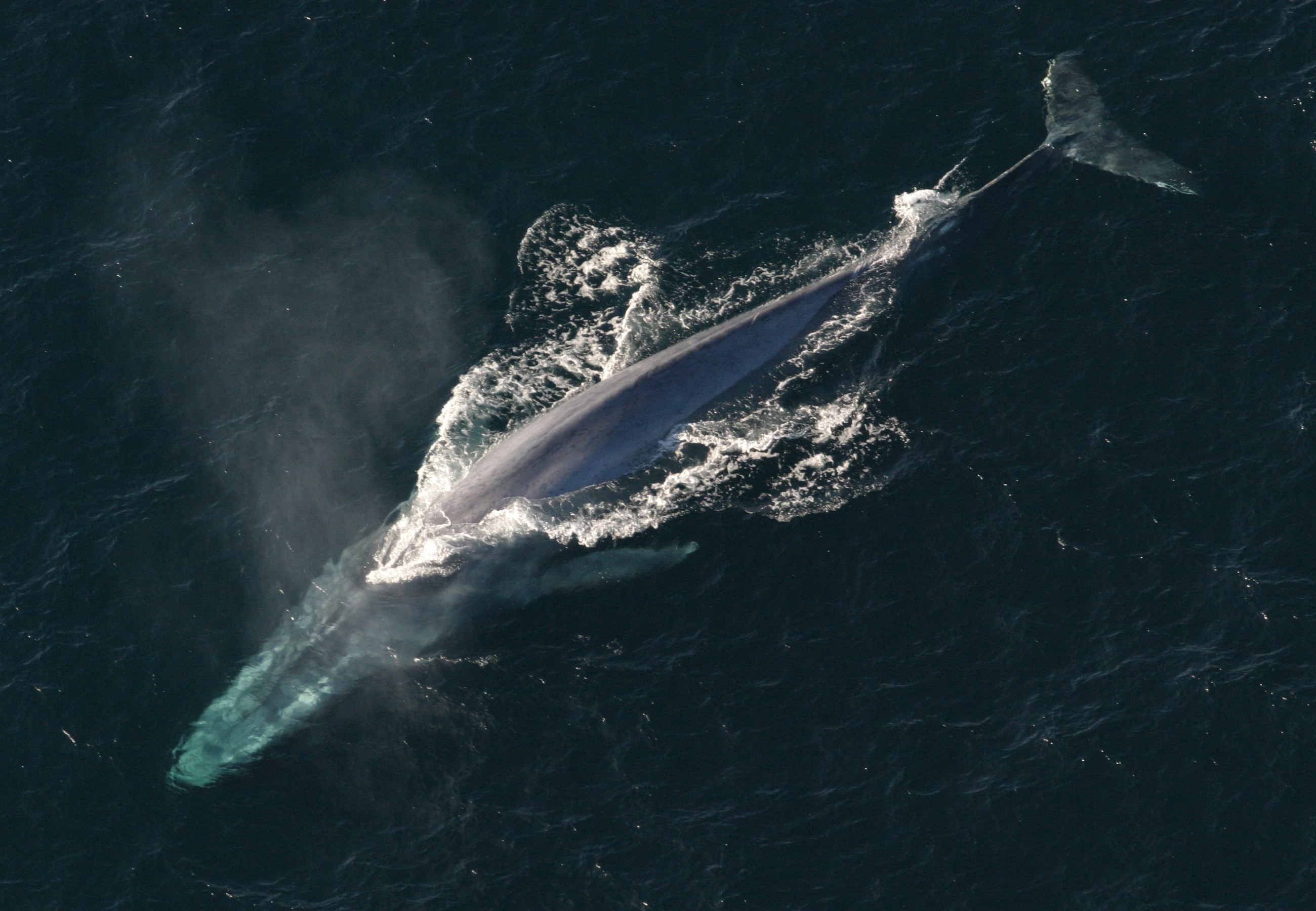
Blue whale

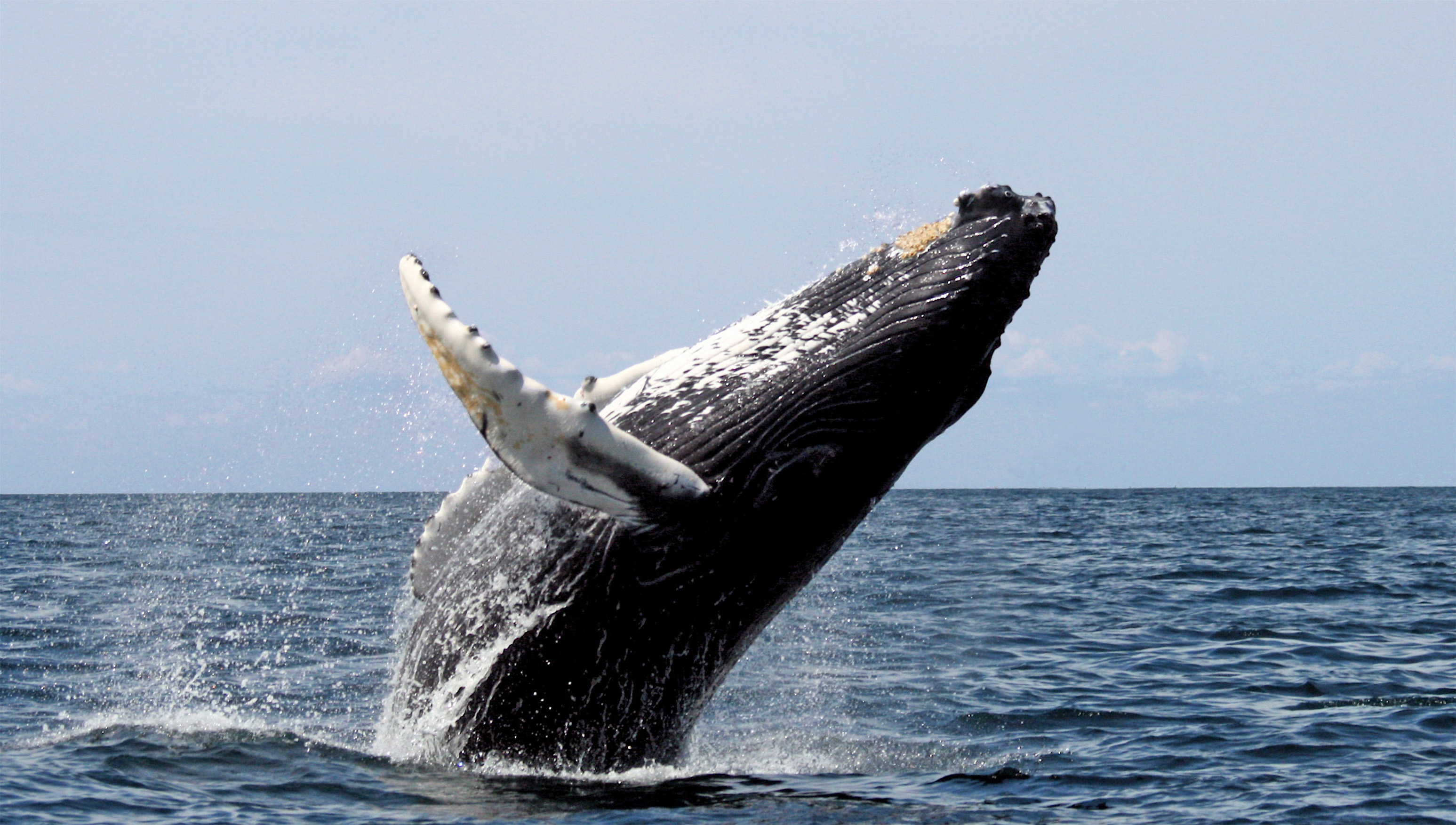
Humpback whale

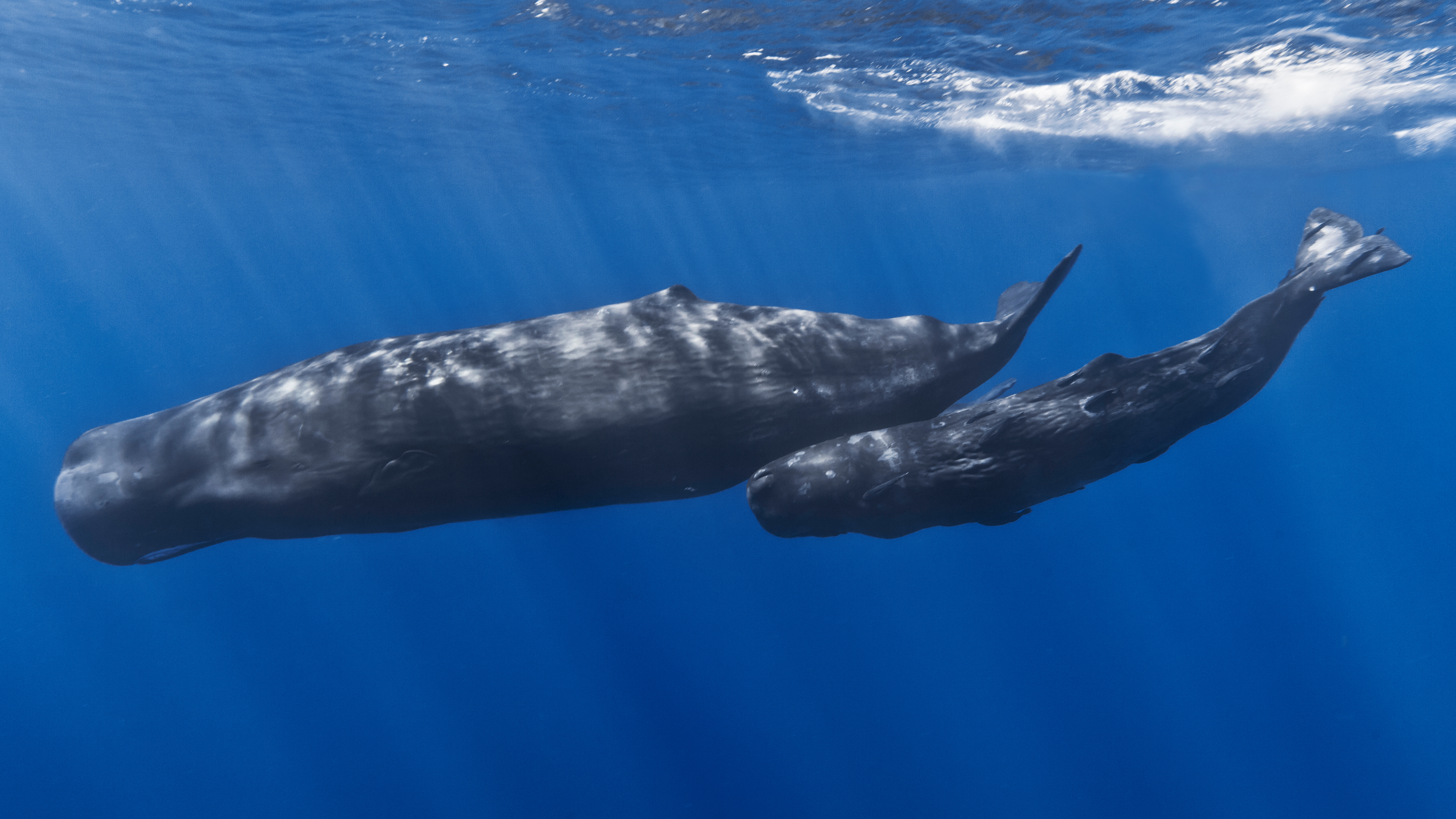
Sperm whales

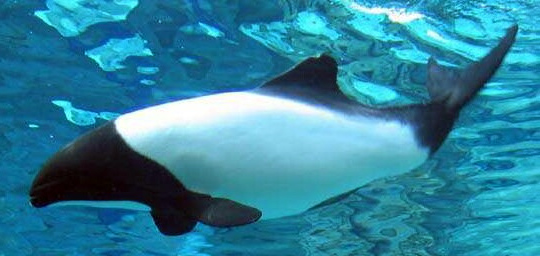
Commerson's dolphin

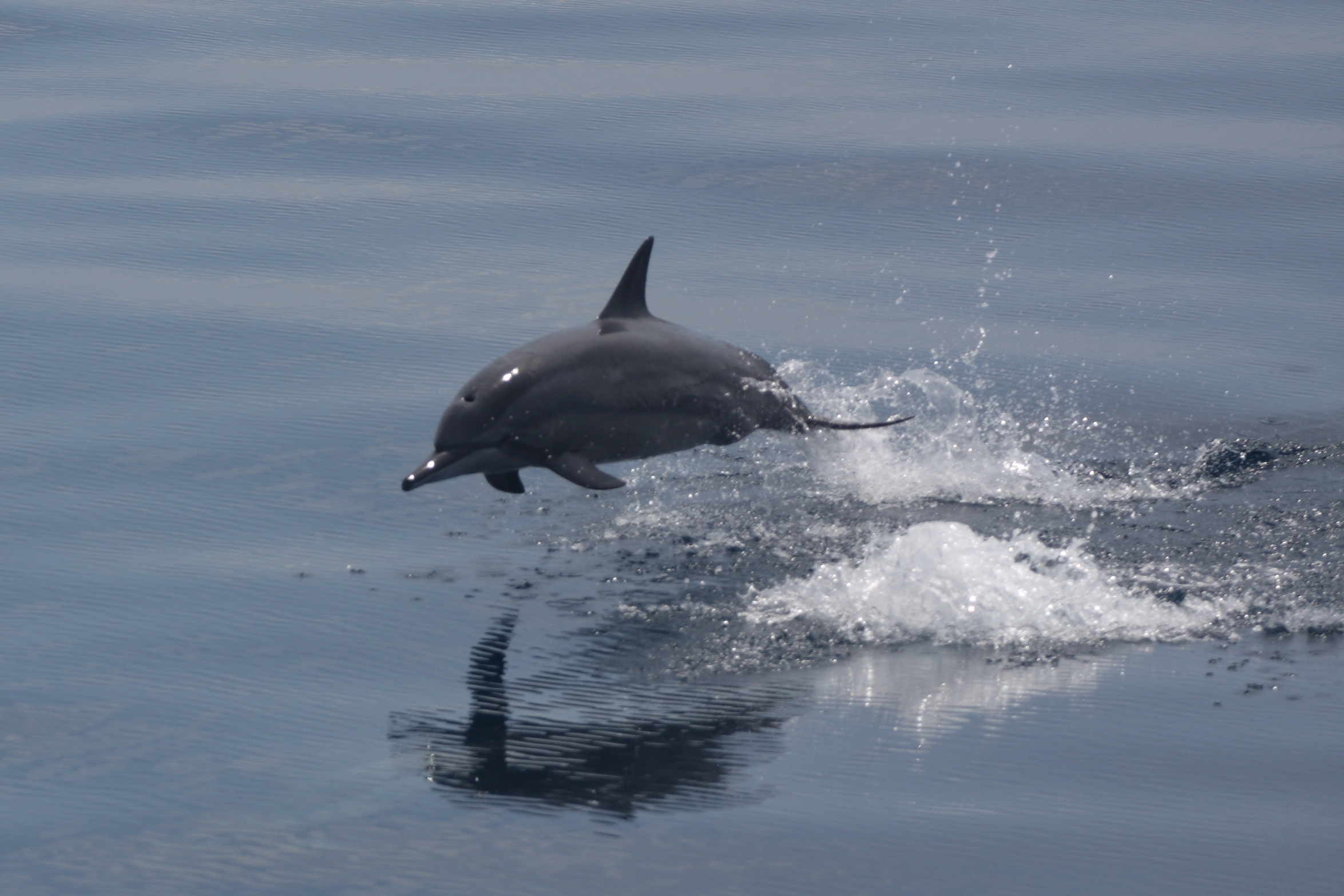
Spinner dolphin

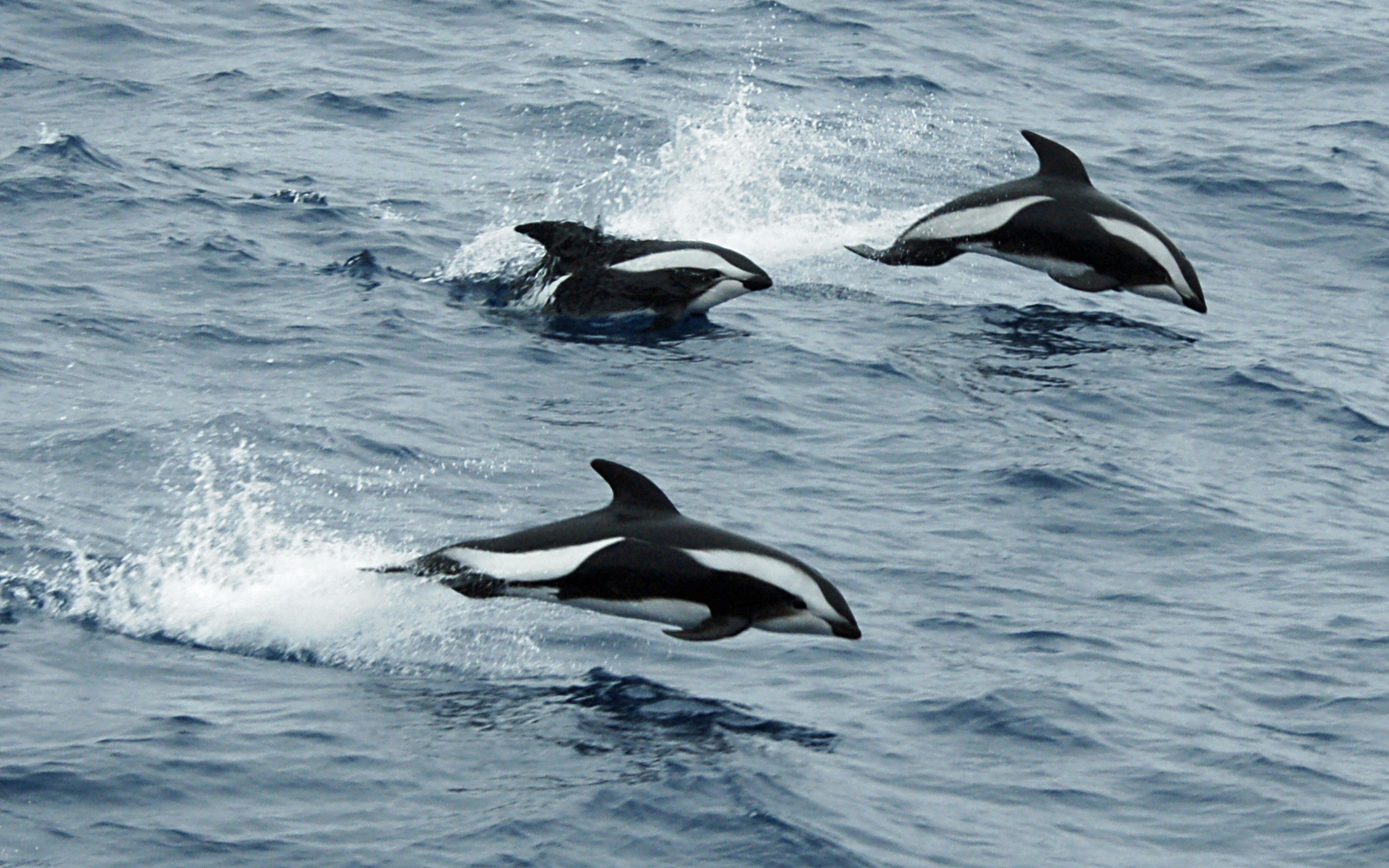
Hourglass dolphin

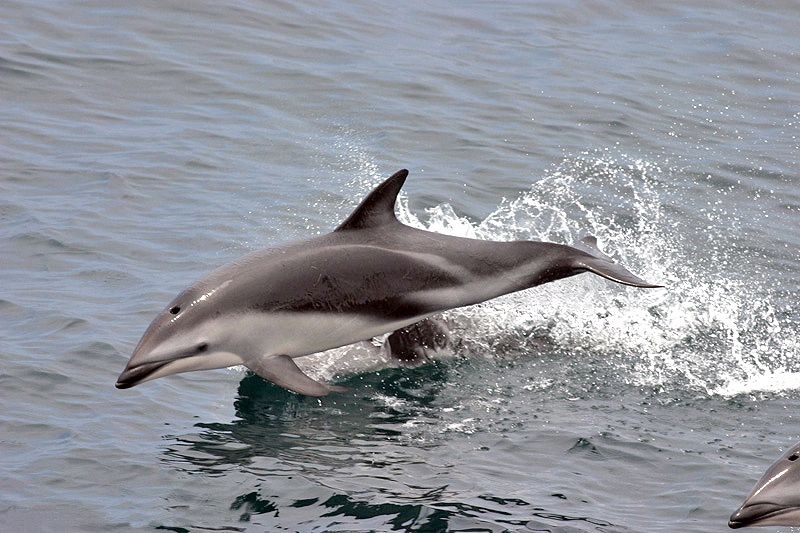
Dusky dolphin

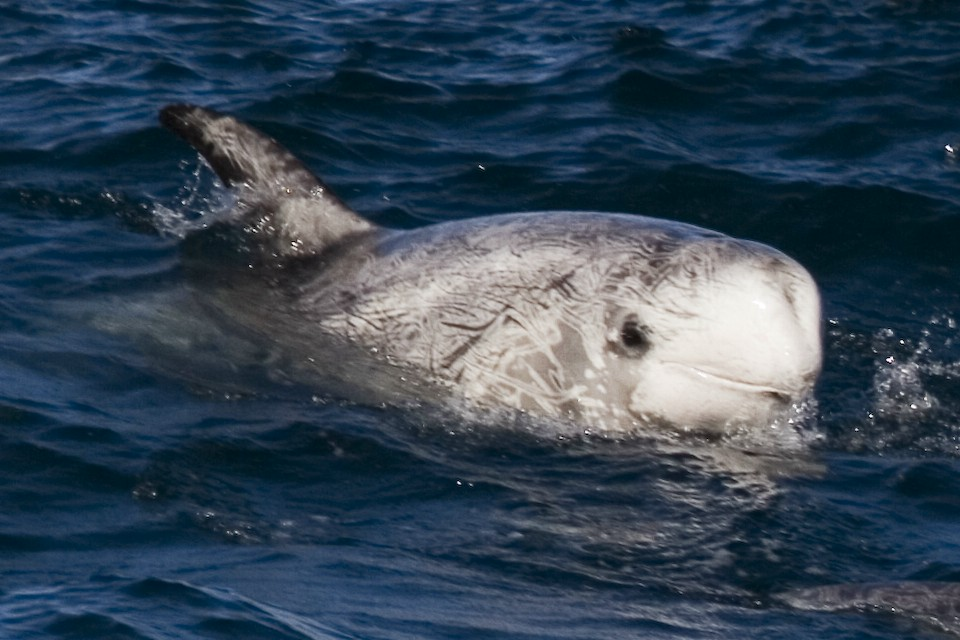
Risso's dolphin

Orca

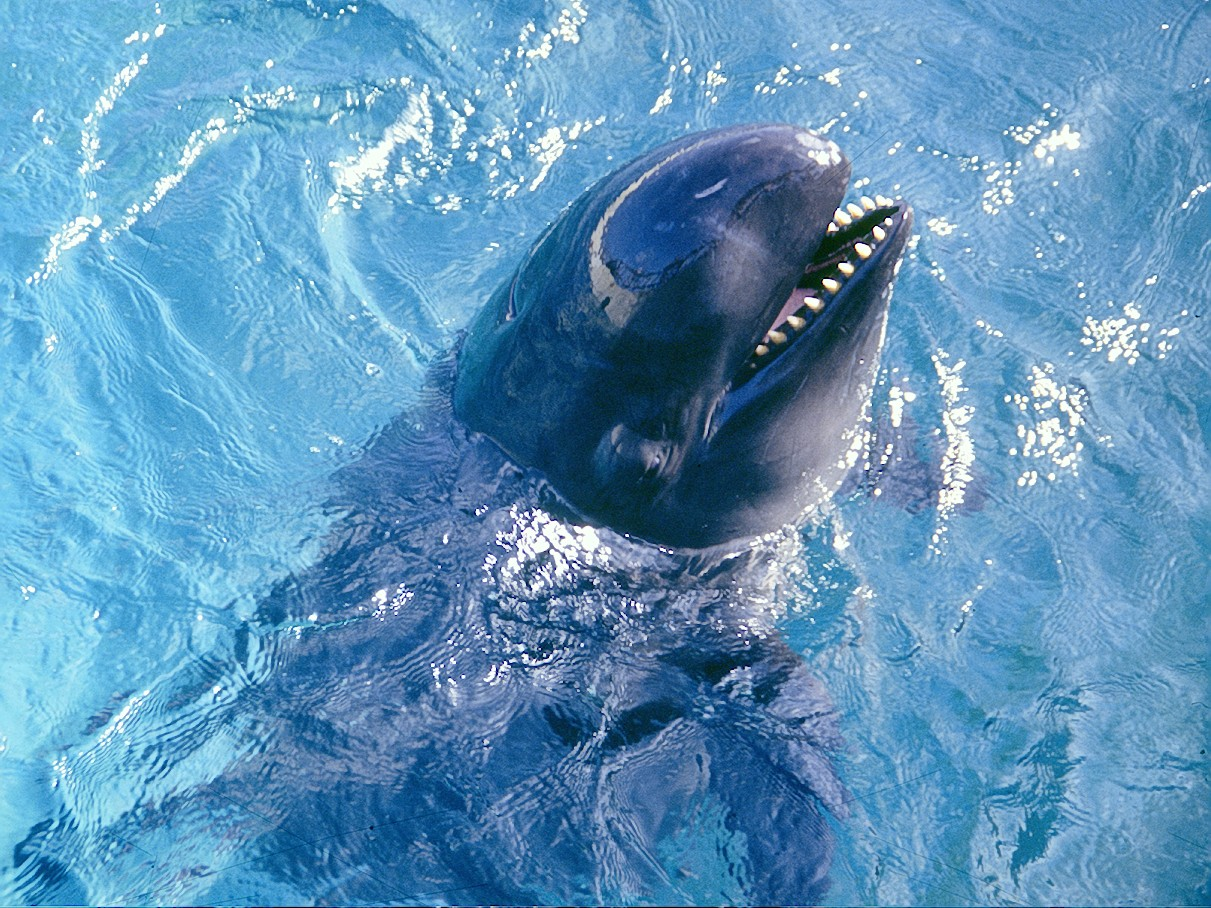
False killer whale

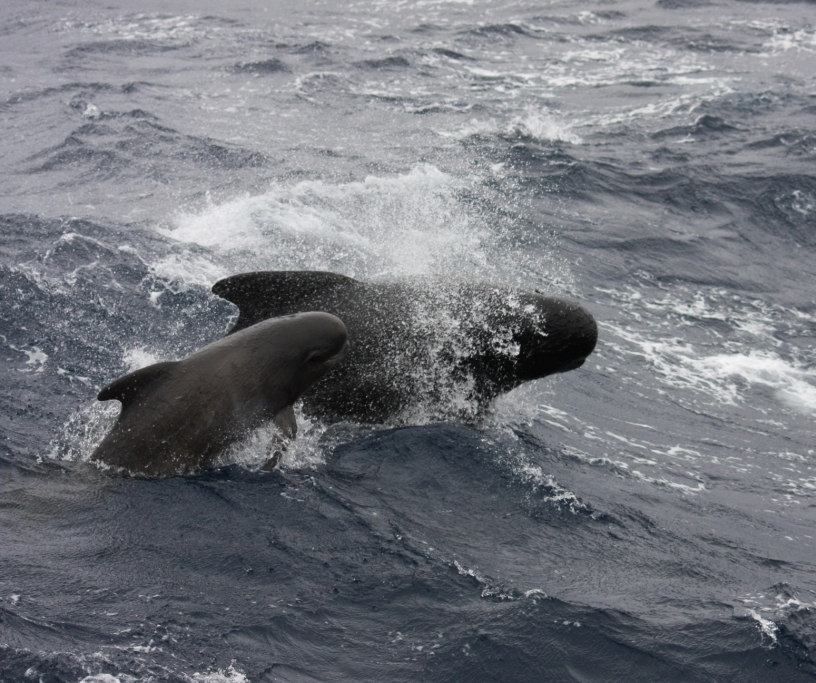
Long-finned pilot whale

The infraorder Cetacea includes whales, dolphins and porpoises. They are the mammals most fully adapted to aquatic life with a spindle-shaped nearly hairless body, protected by a thick layer of blubber, and forelimbs and tail modified to provide propulsion underwater. Their closest extant relatives are the hippos, which are artiodactyls, from which cetaceans descended; cetaceans are thus also artiodactyls.

- Parvorder: Mysticeti
  - Family: Balaenidae
    - Genus: Eubalaena
      - Southern right whale, Eubalaena australis LC
  - Family: Balaenopteridae
    - Subfamily: Balaenopterinae
      - Genus: Balaenoptera
        - Common minke whale, Balaenoptera acutorostrata LC
        - Antarctic minke whale, Balaenoptera bonaerensis NT
        - Sei whale, Balaenoptera borealis EN
        - Bryde's whale, Balaenoptera edeni NE
        - Blue whale, Balaenoptera musculus EN
        - Fin whale, Balaenoptera physalus VU
    - Subfamily: Megapterinae
      - Genus: Megaptera
        - Humpback whale, Megaptera novaeangliae LC
  - Family: Neobalaenidae
    - Genus: Caperea
      - Pygmy right whale, Caperea marginata LC
- Parvorder: Odontoceti
  - Family: Physeteridae
    - Genus: Physeter
      - Sperm whale, Physeter macrocephalus VU
  - Family: Kogiidae
    - Genus: Kogia
      - Pygmy sperm whale, Kogia breviceps DD
      - Dwarf sperm whale, Kogia sima DD
  - Family: Ziphidae
    - Genus: Ziphius
      - Cuvier's beaked whale, Ziphius cavirostris LC
    - Genus: Berardius
      - Arnoux's beaked whale, Berardius arnuxii DD
    - Genus: Tasmacetus
      - Shepherd's beaked whale, Tasmacetus shepherdi DD
    - Subfamily: Hyperoodontinae
      - Genus: Hyperoodon
        - Southern bottlenose whale, Hyperoodon planifrons LC
      - Genus: Mesoplodon
        - Andrews' beaked whale, Mesoplodon bowdoini DD
        - Gray's beaked whale, Mesoplodon grayi DD
        - Hector's beaked whale, Mesoplodon hectori DD
        - Strap-toothed whale, Mesoplodon layardii DD
  - Superfamily: Inioidea (river dolphins)
    - Family: Pontoporiidae
      - Genus: Pontoporia
        - La Plata dolphin, Pontoporia blainvillei VU
  - Superfamily: Delphinoidea
    - Family: Phocoenidae (porpoises)
      - Genus: Phocoena
        - Spectacled porpoise, Phocoena dioptrica LC
        - Burmeister's porpoise, Phocoena spinipinnis NT
    - Family: Delphinidae (marine dolphins)
      - Genus: Cephalorhynchus
        - Commerson's dolphin, Cephalorhynchus commersonii LC
        - Chilean dolphin, Cephalorhynchus eutropia NT
      - Genus: Tursiops
        - Common bottlenose dolphin, Tursiops truncatus LC
      - Genus: Stenella
        - Pantropical spotted dolphin, Stenella attenuata LC
        - Striped dolphin, Stenella coeruleoalba LC
        - Spinner dolphin, Stenella longirostris LC
      - Genus: Delphinus
        - Long-beaked common dolphin, Delphinus capensis DD
        - Short-beaked common dolphin, Delphinus delphis LC
      - Genus: Lagenodelphis
        - Fraser's dolphin, Lagenodelphis hosei LC
      - Genus: Lissodelphis
        - Southern right whale dolphin, Lissodelphis peronii LC
      - Genus: Lagenorhynchus
        - Peale's dolphin, Lagenorhynchus australis LC
        - Hourglass dolphin, Lagenorhynchus cruciger LC
        - Dusky dolphin, Lagenorhynchus obscurus LC
      - Genus: Grampus
        - Risso's dolphin, Grampus griseus LC
      - Genus: Orcinus
        - Orca, Orcinus orca DD
      - Genus: Pseudorca
        - False killer whale, Pseudorca crassidens NT
      - Genus: Globicephala
        - Long-finned pilot whale, Globicephala melas LC

== See also ==
- Environment of Argentina
- List of chordate orders
- List of mammals in Antarctica
- Lists of mammals by region
- List of prehistoric mammals
- Mammal classification
- List of mammals described in the 2000s
