= List of living mammal species described in the 2020s: 2022–2024 =

== List of species ==
Legend to the BGR column

AF Afrotropical AN Antarctic AU Australasian IM Indomalayan NA Nearctic NT Neotropical OC Oceanian PA Palearctic

publ-date (Note: The date of the first publication of the scientific source in which the species/subspecies was first described. In accordance with ISO 8601 and MOS:DATEFORMAT, all dates are recorded in "yyyy-mm-dd" format. The odd and even years highlighted by different colors.)	Order	Family	Scientific name (Note: In this column, the species highlighted by yellow (#F9F5B0) and the subspecies stay unhighlighted. The links to the enwiki articles are supplied with the interwiki links to the appropriate Wikidata items (displayed as superscript "[wd]" after each name), they will be especially useful if some articles are absent and you've decided to create them.)	Common name (Note: The rules for using of capital letters in common names are stated in MOS:LIFE.)	morph-pict (Note: This column contains morphological pictograms which roughly illustrate the appearance of the listed taxa. The main Wikicommons category where such images are stacked is Realistic silhouettes of mammals.)	BGR	Coordinates (Note: The geographic coordinates of the place where the holotype was collected.)	Location (Note: Description of the location where the holotype was collected. Some absent geographic articles that exist in any other language suppled with the interwiki links to the appropriate Wikidata items (superscript "[wd]"). You can help to improve Wikipedia by creating their English conterparts.)	coll-date (Note: The date on which the holotype was collected.)	Wikispp (Note: Since the Wikispecies "id" corresponds to the taxon's sci-name, which listed in the appropriate column, the links in this column shall not be named to play the role of a row counter in the table.)	NCBI ID	MDD ID
2022-01-25	Eulipotyphla	Soricidae	Chodsigoa dabieshanensis	Dabieshan brown-toothed shrew		PA	31°07′07″N 116°14′41″E	Temperate montane mixed forest (~1187 m a.s.l.) on the N slope of the Dabie Mts., ~13 km E of the town of Taiyang, Huoshan County, Lu'an City, Anhui Province, SE China.	2020-08	sp.	2928188	1006625
2022-01-28	Rodentia	Muridae	Mus harennensis	Harenna mouse		AF	6°45′00″N 39°44′00″E	The upper vegetation belt of the Harenna forest (~2760 m a.s.l.) at the Bale Mountains National Park, Bale Zone, Oromia Region, C Ethiopia.	1996-01-18	sp.	2984389	1006634
2022-02-14	Chiroptera	Vespertilionidae	Myotis hayesi	Hayes's thick-thumbed myotis		IM	11°35′00″N 104°55′00″E	Lowland urban area (~10 m a.s.l.) with scattered gardens planted with various species of palms and broadleaf trees on the right bank of the lower Tonlé Sap River, Phnom Penh, S Cambodia.	2000-02-05	sp.		1006637
2022-02-28	Rodentia	Cricetidae	Mindomys kutuku	Kutukú rice rat		NT	2°47′04″S 78°08′24″W	Tropical montane moist evergreen forest (~1925 m a.s.l.) in the Kutukú Mts., ~13 km SEE of the locality of Patuca, Santiago de Méndez Canton, Morona-Santiago Province, SE Ecuador.	2017-09-11	sp.	3014042	1006632
2022-03-16	Rodentia	Spalacidae	Eospalax muliensis	Muli zokor		PA	28°08′06″N 101°11′46″E	Montane grassland (~3700 m a.s.l.) at the S shore of the Cunduo Haizi Lake in the Hengduan Mountains, Kangwu Ranch, ~22 km NNW of the town of Qiaowa, Muli County, Liangshan Prefecture, Sichuan Province, S China.	2021-04-21	sp.		1006635
2022-03-16	Rodentia	Cricetidae	Phyllotis camiari	Camiari leaf-eared mouse		NT	31°36′43″S 64°47′56″W	Montane rocky grassland (~ 2300 m a.s.l.) alongside the highway, Pampa de Achala, ~21 km NE of the town of Mina Clavero, San Alberto Department, Córdoba Province, C Argentina.	2008-08-18	sp.		1006633
2022-03-21	Rodentia	Sciuridae	Tamiops minshanicus	Minshan striped squirrel		PA	33°00′05″N 104°01′09″E	Temperate montane conifer forest (~2880 m a.s.l.) on the N slope of the Minshan Mts., Wanglang National Nature Reserve, ~23 NW of the village of Yazhezaozu, Pingwu County, Mianyang Prefecture, Sichuan Province, C China.	2018-10-29	sp.	3370881	1006627
2022-04-14	Rodentia	Platacanthomyidae	Typhlomys fengjiensis	Fengjie tree mouse		PA	30°39′47″N 109°31′16″E	Temperate montane broadleaf forest with bamboo underbrush (~1883 m a.s.l.), above the Shiruguan Tunnel, ~6 km E of the town of Xinglong, Fengjie County, Chongqing, C China.	2021-03	sp.	2899685	1006669
2022-04-19	Rodentia	Cricetidae	Chilomys carapazi	Carapaz's forest mouse		NT	0°50′59″N 78°14′05″W	Tropical montane moist forest (~2350 m a.s.l.) at the headwaters of the Gualpi River, Drácula Natural Reserve, Carchi Province, NE Ecuador.	2016-09-27	sp.		1006660
2022-04-19	Rodentia	Cricetidae	Chilomys georgeledecii	Ledeci's forest mouse		NT	0°58′57″N 78°13′19″W	Tropical montane moist forest (~1502 m a.s.l.), Peñas Blancas-Pailón, Drácula Natural Reserve, Carchi Province, NE Ecuador.	2018-11-08	sp.		1006661
2022-04-19	Rodentia	Cricetidae	Chilomys neisi	Neisi forest mouse		NT	3°26′52″S 79°36′37″W	Tropical montane moist forest (~2539 m a.s.l.) at Ashigsho, ~3 km NW of the settlement of Chilla, Chilla Canton, El Oro Province, SW Ecuador.	2020-10-04	sp.		1006662
2022-04-19	Rodentia	Cricetidae	Chilomys percequilloi	Percequillo's forest mouse		NT	2°47′14″S 78°07′54″W	Tropical montane moist evergreen forest (~2215 m a.s.l.) in the Kutukú Mts., ~14 km SEE of the locality of Patuca, Santiago de Méndez Canton, Morona-Santiago Province, SE Ecuador.	2018-01-29	sp.		1006663
2022-04-19	Rodentia	Cricetidae	Chilomys weksleri	Weksler's forest mouse		NT	0°41′07″S 78°59′42″W	Tropical montane moist forest (~1654 m a.s.l.) at the Otonga Nature Reserve, near the rural parish of San Francisco de Las Pampas, Sigchos Canton, Cotopaxi Province, C Ecuador.	2020-10-05	sp.		1006664
2022-05-01	Rodentia	Cricetidae	Chionomys stekolnikovi	Stekolnikov's snow vole		PA	37°36′30″N 35°00′16″E	Temperate montane conifer shrubland (~1700 m a.s.l.) on the NW foot of the Mt. Karanfil in the Anti-Taurus Mts., ~3.5 km SE of the settlement of Aşçıbekirli, Pozantı District, Adana Province, S Turkey.	2009-05-01	sp.		1006652
2022-05-16	Primates	Pitheciidae	Cacajao amuna	Kanamari white uacari		NT	6°56′06″S 69°44′16″W	Tropical lowland seasonally flooded forest (~150 m a.s.l.) near the shore of the small Lake Itucumã on the right bank of the lower Tarauacá River, ~31 km SE of the town of Eirunepé, Amazonas State, NW Brazil.		sp.	2937889	1006644
2022-05-20	Primates	Cercopithecidae	Macaca selai	Sela macaque		IM	27°24′21″N 92°08′00″E	Subtropical montane broadleaf forest (~2016 m a.s.l.), located ~1 km SE of the village of Nyukmadung, West Kameng district, Arunachal Pradesh, NE India.		sp.		1006642
2022-05-25	Rodentia	Cricetidae	Thomasomys burneoi	Burneo's oldfield mouse		NT	2°10′47″S 78°30′11″W	Tropical montane heathland (~3533 m a.s.l.) on the S shore of a small lake named Laguna Negra in the N part of Andes, Sangay National Park, ~15 km W of the parish of Zúñac, Morona Canton, Morona-Santiago Province, C Ecuador.	2017-08-18	sp.	2950100	1006667
2022-05-31	Rodentia	Cricetidae	Rhipidomys bezerrensis	Bezerros climbing rat		NT	8°11′35″S 35°47′31″W	Disturbed tropical upland moist forest (~770 m a.s.l.) in the W part of the Borborema Plateau, vicinity of the Serra Negra Ecological Park, ~4.5 km NW of the town of Bezerros, Pernambuco State, E Brazil.	2002-04-18	sp.		1006665
2022-05-31	Rodentia	Cricetidae	Rhipidomys caracolensis	Caracol climbing rat		NT	9°13′00″S 43°27′00″W	Moist evergreen forest remnants surrounded by the caatinga (~550 m a.s.l.), Serra das Confusões National Park, ~14 km NW of the town of Caracol, Piauí State, E Brazil.	2002-01-22	sp.		1006666
2022-06-06	Rodentia	Cricetidae	Phyllotis pehuenche	Pehuenche leaf-eared mouse		NT	35°11′41″S 70°02′53″W	Temperate montane semi-arid shrubland (~1900 m a.s.l.) on the bank of the Salado River (Atuel River tributary), ~6 km SE of the ski resort of Las Leñas, Malargüe Department, Mendoza Province, SW Argentina.	2004-02-23	sp.		1006580
2022-06-15	Chiroptera	Vespertilionidae	Glischropus meghalayanus	Meghalaya thick-thumbed bat		IM	25°56′13″N 91°46′24″E	Subtropical lowland rainforest (~210 m a.s.l.) on the right bank of the Umtrew River, adjacent to the Nongkhyllem Wildlife Sanctuary, ~7 km SW of the village of Lailad Ri-Bhoi district, Meghalaya, NW India.	2020-07-01	sp.		1006678
2022-07-09	Rodentia	Cricetidae	Microtus irani darvishi	Iranian vole (darvishi)		PA				ssp.		1002074
2022-07-13	Dasyuromorphia	Dasyuridae	Sminthopsis leucopus janetzkiae	White-footed dunnart (janetzkiae)		AU				ssp.		1000210
2022-07-15	Rodentia	Cricetidae	Alticola kohistanicus	Kohistan mountain vole		PA	35°51′14″N 73°21′59″E	Temperate montane semi-arid shrubland (~2900 m a.s.l.) on the left bank of the Barobas River, ~23 km NNW of the town of Tangir, Gilgit-Baltistan, N Pakistan.	1995-10-12	sp.		1006656
2022-07-15	Rodentia	Cricetidae	Lemmus novosibiricus kamchaticus	East Siberian brown lemming (kamchaticus)		PA	54°29′30″N 159°58′06″E	Temperate upland moist shrubland (~700 m a.s.l.) on the shore of the Lake Maloe at the foot of the Volcano Uzon in the SE part the Kamchatka Peninsula, Kronotsky Nature Reserve, Kamchatka Region, NE Russia.	1974-10-12	ssp.		1006711
2022-08-18	Rodentia	Muridae	Baletemys kampalili	Kampalili shrew mouse		IM	7°17′43″N 126°18′58″E	Tropical montane moist evergreen broadleaf forest (~1640 m a.s.l.), ~3.4 km E of the Mt. Kampalili peak, located in the SE part of the island of Mindanao, ~20 km NW of the settlement of Manay, Davao Oriental Province, SE Philippines.	2010-03-02	sp.		1006668
2022-08-18	Chiroptera	Miniopteridae	Miniopterus phillipsi	Phillips's long-fingered bat		IM	6°46′45″N 80°53′48″E	Idulgashinna montane cave (~1590 m a.s.l.) surrounded by the tropical montane moist forest, located near the Idulgashinna railway station and a tea plantation, Badulla District, Uva Province, C Sri Lanka.	2019-01-29	sp.		1006676
2022-08-18	Chiroptera	Rhinolophidae	Rhinolophus namuli	Namuli horseshoe bat		AF	15°22′09″S 37°03′41″E	Tropical montane evergreen forest (~1650 m a.s.l.) in the E foothills of the Mt. Namuli, ~12 km NE of the town of Gurúè, Zambezia Province, NC Mozambique.	2008-11-21	sp.		1006674
2022-10-07	Chiroptera	Vespertilionidae	Neoromicia hlandzeni	Lowveld serotine		AF	26°10′48″S 32°02′55″E	Subtropical lowland seasonal forest (~110 m a.s.l.) on the right bank of the Mbuluzi River, Mlawula Nature Reserve, ~12 km NE of the town of Simunye, Lubombo Region, NE Eswatini.	2005-09-05	sp.	3076792	1006679
2022-10-14	Primates	Pitheciidae	Cheracebus aquinoi	Aquino's titi		NT	4°15′45″S 73°42′00″W	Tropical lowland evergreen forest (~150 m a.s.l.) in the upper basin of the Amazon River, ~2.5 km NE of the locality of Villa Belén, San Juan Bautista District, Maynas Province, Loreto Department, NE Peru.	2019-06-18	sp.		1006643
2022-10-22	Rodentia	Ctenomyidae	Ctenomys heniacamiare	Henia-Camiare tuco-tuco		NT	31°41′08″S 64°53′54″W	Temperate montane semi-arid rocky grassland (~1700 m a.s.l.) alongside the highway, ~10 km m NE of the town of Mina Clavero, San Alberto Department, Córdoba Province, C Argentina.	2021-05-21	sp.	3041102	1006649
2022-11-10	Rodentia	Cricetidae	Akodon diauarum	Diauarum grass mouse		NT	13°00′53″S 53°10′39″W	Tropical upland seasonal semi-deciduous forest (~359 m a.s.l.), located ~20 km NE of the town of Gaúcha do Norte, Mato Grosso State, C Brazil.	1997-05-08	sp.	3139733	1006689
2022-12-14	Chiroptera	Vespertilionidae	Myotis barquezi	Barquez's myotis		NT	23°13′00″S 64°32′00″W	Tropical upland moist forest (~670 m a.s.l.) at Finca Alto Verde, ~20 km SW of the city of San Ramón de la Nueva Orán, Orán Department, Salta Province, NW Argentina.	2006-09-14	sp.	3370334	1006737
2022-12-26	Rodentia	Cricetidae	Neodon bershulaensis	Bershula mountain vole		PA	28°35′02″N 98°07′27″E	Temperate montane conifer forest (~3750 m a.s.l.) alongside a stream in the Bershula Mts., ~10 km N of the village of Ridong, Chayu County, Nyingchi Prefecture, TAR, SW China.	2011-03-03	sp.	2613863	1006713
2022-12-26	Rodentia	Cricetidae	Neodon bomiensis	Bomi mountain vole		PA	29°45′35″N 95°57′27″E	Temperate montane conifer forest (~2900 m a.s.l.) in the basin of the Yalu Zangbu River, ~20 km E of the town of Zhamo, Bomê County, Nyingchi Prefecture, TAR, SW China.	2013-10-31	sp.		1006714
2022-12-26	Rodentia	Cricetidae	Neodon chayuensis	Chayu mountain vole		PA	28°51′26″N 96°59′19″E	Temperate montane conifer forest (~2960 m a.s.l.) on the bank of a stream, Cibagou National Nature Reserve, ~50 km NW of the town of Zhuwagen, Chayu County, Nyingchi Prefecture, TAR, SW China.	2007-10-08	sp.	2929751	1006715
2022-12-26	Rodentia	Cricetidae	Neodon liaoruii	Liao Rui's mountain vole		PA	29°28′13″N 94°59′02″E	Temperate montane conifer forest (~3260 m a.s.l.) in the N part of the Namcha Barwa Himal range, ~35 NW of the town of Mêdog, Mêdog County, TAR, SW China.	2011-11-01	sp.	2613866	1006716
2022-12-26	Rodentia	Cricetidae	Neodon namchabarwaensis	Namchabarwa mountain vole		PA	29°10′44″N 94°09′04″E	Temperate montane mixed broadleaf-conifer forest edge (~3160 m a.s.l.) on the left bank of the Yalu Zangbu River, alongside the S part of the Namcha Barwa Himal range, ~4 km W of the town of Naiyü Lhoba, Mainling County, TAR, SW China.	2008-08-10	sp.	2929752	1006717
2022-12-26	Rodentia	Cricetidae	Neodon shergylaensis	Shergyla mountain vole		PA	29°37′25″N 94°39′42″E	Temperate montane conifer forest (~4500 m a.s.l.) in the Shergyla Mts., ~27 km W of the prefecture-level city of Nyingchi, TAR, SW China.	2009-05-30	sp.		1006718
2023-01-10	Didelphimorphia	Didelphidae	Metachirus aritanai	Aritana's brown four-eyed opossum		NT	5°46′53″S 50°31′49″W	Tropical lowland evergreen forest (~250 m a.s.l.) in the basin of the Itacaiunas River, Tapirapé-Aquiri National Forest, Marabá Municipality, Pará State, C Brazil.	1999-07-08	sp.	3019965	1006690
2023-01-11	Chiroptera	Vespertilionidae	Pseudoromicia principis	Principe serotine		AF	1°38′06″N 7°25′08″E	Tropical lowland moist forest (~50 m a.s.l.) at the town of Santo António in the NE part of the island of Príncipe, São Tomé and Príncipe.	1988-03-26	sp.		1006741
2023-01-11	Primates	Callitrichidae	Saguinus kulina	Kulinas' mustached tamarin		NT	3°49′35″S 66°04′33″W	Tropical lowland moist terra firma evergreen forest (~60 m a.s.l.) on the right bank of the Andirá River in the upper basin of the Amazon River, Baixo Juruá Extractive Reserve, ~38 km S of the town of Juruá, Amazonas State, NW Brazil.	2018-07-18	sp.		1006696
2023-01-13	Eulipotyphla	Erinaceidae	Podogymnura intermedia	Eastern Mindanao gymnure		IM	6°42′26″N 126°11′43″E	Tropical montane moist evergreen (~950 m a.s.l.) on the shore of a small lake in the SE part of the island of Mindanao, ~4 km SSE of Mt. Hamiguitan peak, Mount Hamiguitan Range Wildlife Sanctuary, Mati Municipality, Davao Oriental Province, SE Philippines.	2005-07-28	sp.		1006725
2023-01-18	Chiroptera	Vespertilionidae	Pseudoromicia mbamminkom	Mbam Minkom serotine		AF	3°58′09″N 11°22′50″E	Tropical upland moist forest (~785 m a.s.l.) on the NW slope of the Mt. Mbam Minkoum, near the village of Nkolakie, Lekié Department, ~10 km SE of the city of Yaoundé, Centre Region, W Cameroon.	2019-08-14	sp.	3024965	1006740
2023-02-25	Eulipotyphla	Soricidae	Cryptotis woodmani	El Triunfo small-eared shrew		NT	15°39′47″N 92°48′25″W	Tropical montane moist evergreen forest (~2100 m a.s.l.) in the NW part of the Sierra Madre Mts., El Triunfo Biosphere Reserve, ~25 km SW of the town of Jaltenango de la Paz, Ángel Albino Corzo Municipality, Chiapas State, S Mexico.	2007-11-15	sp.		1006727
2023-03-31	Rodentia	Ctenomyidae	Ctenomys pulcer	Monte Hermoso tuco-tuco		NT	38°56′47″S 61°15′22″W	Temperate coastal seasonal shrubland (~25 m a.s.l.) at the Estancia Delta, ~4 km NE of the town of Monte Hermoso, Monte Hermoso Partido, Buenos Aires Province, SE Argentina.	1999-07-05	sp.	3042591	1006746
2023-05-03	Chiroptera	Hipposideridae	Hipposideros kingstonae	Kingston's leaf-nosed bat		IM	6°04′00″N 101°58′00″E	Tropical lowland peat swamp forest (~170 m a.s.l.) at the Princess Sirindhorn Wildlife Sanctuary, ~3 N of the town of Su-ngai Kolok, Su-ngai Kolok District, Narathiwat Province, S Thailand.	2014-09-03	sp.	3030810	1006813
2023-05-16	Rodentia	Ctenomyidae	Ctenomys eileenae	Eileen's tuco-tuco		NT	28°28′35″S 68°50′15″W	Subtropical montane arid grassland (~3609 m a.s.l.) alongside the highway in the SE part of the Andes, near Refugio El Peñón of the Laguna Brava Nature Reserve, ~70 NW of the settlement of Villa San José de Vinchina, Vinchina Department, La Rioja Province, SW Argentina.	2022-05-14	sp.	3064696	1006824
2023-05-16	Rodentia	Ctenomyidae	Ctenomys verzi	Verzi's tuco-tuco		NT	35°05′50″S 70°08′11″W	Temperate montane arid grassland (~2800 m a.s.l.) in the SE part of the Andes, ~10 km by road NW of the ski resort of Las Leñas, Malargüe Department, Mendoza Province, SW Argentina.	2008-03-27	sp.	3064697	1006825
2023-05-26	Chiroptera	Miniopteridae	Miniopterus srinii	Srini's long-fingered bat		IM	12°06′07″N 75°49′48″E	Subterranean cave surrounded by the tropical montane moist evergreen forest (~860 m a.s.l.) in the SE part of the Western Ghats Mts., E of the Makutta Forest Reserve, ~10 km S of the town of Virajpet, Kodagu District, Karnataka, SW India.		sp.		1006815
2023-06-15	Carnivora	Felidae	Leopardus narinensis	Nariño cat		NT	1°13′44″N 77°21′03″W	Tropical montane moist forest (~3900 m a.s.l.) on the NE slope of the Galeras Volcano, ~8 km NW of the town center of Pasto, Nariño Department, SW Colombia.	1989	sp.		1006822
2023-06-21	Rodentia	Cricetidae	Thomasomys lojapiuranus	Piura oldfield mouse		NT	5°09′31″S 79°32′56″W	Tropical montane seasonal forest patch (~2990 m a.s.l.) near the settlement of Pariamarca Alto, Huancabamba Province, Piura Department, NW Peru.	2006-04-28	sp.	2976202	1006772
2023-06-21	Rodentia	Cricetidae	Thomasomys pagaibambensis	Pagaibamba oldfield mouse		NT	6°25′47″S 79°03′29″W	Tropical montane seasonal woodland (~2902 m a.s.l.) at the Pagaibamba Protection Forest, ~8 km SW of the settlement of Querocoto, Querocoto District, Chota Province, Cajamarca Department, NW Peru.	2007-09-29	sp.	2904039	1006773
2023-06-21	Rodentia	Cricetidae	Thomasomys shallqukucha	Shallqa oldfield mouse		NT	6°05′55″S 79°14′24″W	Tropical montane seasonal woodland (~3266 m a.s.l.), located ~6 km SE of the town of Cañaris, Cañaris District, Ferreñafe Province, Lambayeque Department, NW Peru.	2016-10-14	sp.	2904040	1006774
2023-07-01	Rodentia	Calomyscidae	Calomyscus kermanensis	Kerman brush-tailed mouse		PA	30°12′N 57°33′E	Subtropical montane semi-arid shrubland (~1862 m a.s.l.) at the village of Sirch, Kerman Province, S Iran.	2017-08-30	sp.	3112870	1006766
2023-07-04	Chiroptera	Molossidae	Nyctinomops mbopicuare	Guaraní free-tailed bat		NT	27°16′44″S 55°34′35″W	Subtropical lowland moist forest (~100 m a.s.l.) on the left bank of the Paraná River, Osununú Nature Reserve, San Ignacio Department, Misiones Province, NE Argentina.	2019-11-18	sp.		1006817
2023-07-17	Rodentia	Cricetidae	Euryoryzomys cerqueirai	Cerqueira's rice rat		NT	4°14′19″S 38°54′00″W	Tropical montane moist forest (~800 m a.s.l.), located ~2.5 km SE of the town of Pacoti, Ceará State, E Brazil.	1998-10-10	sp.		1006768
2023-07-18	Eulipotyphla	Talpidae	Talpa davidiana tatvanensis	Pere David's mole		PA	38°23′19″N 42°38′53″E	Temperate montane semi-arid shrubland (~1735 m a.s.l.) close to agricultural area, ~1 km E of the village of Kaynarca, Tatvan District, Bitlis Province, E Turkey.	2021-08-10	ssp.		1004338
2023-07-18	Eulipotyphla	Talpidae	Talpa hakkariensis	Hakkari mole		PA	37°38′00″N 43°37′00″E	Temperate montane semi-arid shrubland (~2850 m a.s.l.) beside a stream, ~8 km NNE of town of Durankaya, Hakkâri Province, SE Turkey.	2021-08-13	sp.	3128910	1006807
2023-08-03	Primates	Cercopithecidae	Colobus angolensis mahale	Mahale Angola colobus		AF	6°06′00″S 29°46′01″E	Tropical montane moist forest (~1970 m a.s.l.) on the S slope of the Mt. Ihumo, Mahale Mountains National Park, Kigoma District, Kigoma Region, CW Tanzania.	2022-04-21	ssp.		1000636
2023-08-14	Dasyuromorphia	Dasyuridae	Planigale kendricki	Orange-headed pilbara planigale		AU	23°23′21″S 115°53′12″E	Subtropical lowland xeric shrubland (~300 m a.s.l.) at the Barlee Range Nature Reserve, Western Australia, NW Australia.	1994-06-13	sp.	64008	1006758
2023-08-14	Dasyuromorphia	Dasyuridae	Planigale tealei	Cracking-clay pilbara planigale		AU	21°17′14″S 117°15′51″E	Tropical lowland xeric shrubland (~180 m a.s.l.) at the Millstream Chichester National Park, Western Australia, NW Australia.	1997-07-02	sp.	2766929	1006759
2023-08-17	Rodentia	Cricetidae	Neacomys marci	Marc's bristly mouse		NT	1°00′24″N 78°13′29″W	Tropical montane moist forest (~1067 m a.s.l.) at the Drácula Nature Reserve, ~2 km E of the locality of Chical, Tulcán, Tulcán Canton, Carchi, NE Ecuador.	2020-11-18	sp.	37027	1006769
2023-08-28	Eulipotyphla	Talpidae	Uropsilus fansipanensis	Fansipan shrew mole		IM	22°18′48″N 103°45′55″E	Tropical montane moist dwarf forest (~2900 m a.s.l.) on the NW slope of the Mt. Fansipan, Hoàng Liên National Park, Lào Cai Province, NW Vietnam.	2022-05-01	sp.	3073269	1006810
2023-09-21	Rodentia	Cricetidae	Rhipidomys ybyrae	Ybyra climbing rat		NT	10°41′22″S 52°54′17″W	Tropical lowland seasonal semi-deciduous forest (~280 m a.s.l.) at Fazenda São Luís, ~23 km NW of the town of São José do Xingu, Mato Grosso State, C Brazil		sp.	3370746	1006771
2023-09-28	Eulipotyphla	Soricidae	Soriculus medogensis	Medog large-clawed shrew		PA	29°42′07″N 95°31′34″E	Temperate montane shrubland (~2560 m a.s.l.), ~24 km NNE of the settlement of Damu, Mêdog County, Nyingchi Prefecture, TAR, SW China.	2018-10-29	sp.		1006804
2023-09-28	Eulipotyphla	Soricidae	Soriculus nivatus	Snow Mountain large-clawed shrew		PA	29°44′31″N 95°40′59″E	Temperate montane heathland (~3619 m a.s.l.), ~34 km NE of the settlement of Damu, Mêdog County, Nyingchi Prefecture, TAR, SW China.	2019-06-02	sp.		1006806
2023-10-12	Rodentia	Cricetidae	Oecomys jamari	Jamari arboreal rice rat		NT	9°10′48″S 62°57′11″W	Tropical lowland moist semi-deciduous broadleaf forest (~100 m a.s.l.) on the left bank of the Jacundá River, Jamari National Forest, ~25 km E of the town of Itapuã do Oeste, Rondônia State, W Brazil.	2011-10-17	sp.		1006770
2023-10-13	Eulipotyphla	Soricidae	Parablarinella latimaxillata	Anhui short-tailed shrew		PA	30°58′52″N 116°05′06″E	Temperate montane mixed forest (~1100 m a.s.l.) in the Dabie Mountains, Yaoluoping Nature Reserve, ~9.5 km NW of the town of Heping, Yuexi County, Anqing Prefecture, Anhui Province, SE China.	2021-09-25	sp.		1006801
2023-10-17	Chiroptera	Phyllostomidae	Sturnira boadai	Boada's yellow-shouldered bat		NT	4°15′29″S 78°40′35″W	Tropical montane evergreen forest (~1350 m a.s.l.) on the left bank of the Nangaritza River, ~3.5 km SW of the settlement of Las Orquideas, Nangaritza Canton, Zamora-Chinchipe Province, SE Ecuador.	2009-03-12	sp.		1006814
2023-10-18	Chiroptera	Vespertilionidae	Myotis nustrale	Corsican myotis		PA	42°16′42″N 8°54′43″E	Temperate montane conifer forest (~1100 m a.s.l.) dominated by Pinus nigra and located in the SW part of the Monte Cinto Massif on the island of Corsica, ~8 km SW of the settlement of Albertacce, Haute-Corse Department, SE France.	2006-07-25	sp.	3115248	1006819
2023-10-31	Rodentia	Spalacidae	Nannospalax hellenicus nopcsai	Hellenic blind mole-rat (nopcsai)		PA	40°37′08″N 20°12′00″E	Temperate montane mixed woodland (~1460 m a.s.l.) on the E slope of the Tomorr Mts., ~1.5 km S of the village of Ujanik, Berat County, S Albania.	2014-09-25	ssp.		1006786
2023-11-09	Rodentia	Muridae	Vernaya meiguites	Meigu climbing mouse		PA	28°38′55″N 103°03′04″E	Temperate montane mixed forest (~2616 m a.s.l.), ~9 km NW of the town of Hongxi, Meigu County, Liangshan Prefecture, Sichuan Province, SW China.	2020	sp.	3074228	1006776
2023-11-09	Rodentia	Muridae	Vernaya nushanensis	Nushan climbing mouse		IM	25°45′26″N 99°06′53″E	Azalea shrubs at the subtropical montane semi-deciduous forest edge (~2500 m a.s.l.), Mt. Xuemeng, ~10 N of the town of Caojian, Yunlong County, Dali Prefecture, Yunnan Province, SW China.	2019-09-09	sp.	3074229	1006777
2023-11-15	Eulipotyphla	Soricidae	Cryptotis andinus	Southern Colombian small-eared shrew		NT	0°54′17″N 78°01′23″W	Tropical montane moist evergreen forest (~2300 m a.s.l.) near the locality of San Felipe, ~25 km W of the town of Cumbal, Nariño Department, SW Colombia.	1992-09-03	sp.		1006802
2023-11-15	Eulipotyphla	Soricidae	Cryptotis huttereri	Rainer's small-eared shrew		NT	3°30′37″N 76°05′43″W	Tropical montane moist semi-deciduous forest (~2600 m a.s.l.) at the headwaters of the Nima River, ~20 km E of the city of Palmira, Valle de Cauca Department, W Colombia.	1994-08-28	sp.		1006803
2023-11-28	Eulipotyphla	Erinaceidae	Mesechinus orientalis	Eastern forest hedgehog		PA	30°34′42″N 118°41′47″E	Subtropical upland moist broadleaf evergreen forest (~600 m a.s.l.) at the village of Taquan, ~10 km S of the town of Xikou, Xuanzhou District, Xuancheng City, Anhui Province, SE China.	2023-05	sp.	3104698	1006794
2023-12-07	Eulipotyphla	Talpidae	Uropsilus huanggangensis	Huangang hrew mole		IM	27°51′49″N 117°46′52″E	Subtropical montane moist semi-deciduous forest edge (~2061 m a.s.l.) at the summit of the Mt. Huanggang, Wuyishan National Park, ~15 km S of the town of Wuyishan, Yanshan County, Shangrao City, Jiangxi Province, SE China.	2022-06	sp.		1006811
2023-12-13	Rodentia	Muridae	Rattus feileri	Feiler's rat		AU	1°52′16″S 124°47′30″E	Tropical lowland moist evergreen forest (~200 m a.s.l.) on the island of Taliabu, North Maluku Province, NE Indonesia.	1938-09-30	sp.		1006781
2023-12-13	Rodentia	Muridae	Rattus halmaheraensis	Halmahera Island rat		AU	1°12′41″N 127°33′36″E	Tropical lowland moist evergreen forest (~150 m a.s.l.) in the NW part of the island of Halmahera, near the village of Goal, West Halmahera Regency, North Maluku Province, NE Indonesia.	1991-05-01	sp.		1006782
2023-12-13	Rodentia	Muridae	Rattus taliabuensis	Taliabu Island rat		AU	1°51′43″S 124°46′37″E	Tropical lowland moist evergreen forest (~300 m a.s.l.) on the island of Taliabu, North Maluku Province, NE Indonesia.	1938-09-27	sp.		1006784
2023-12-21	Eulipotyphla	Erinaceidae	Hylomys macarong	Dalat gymnure		IM	11°52′58″N 108°09′55″E	Tropical montane moist evergreen forest (~1200 m a.s.l.) dominated by Pinus kesiya at the commune of Phú Sơn, Lâm Hà District, Lâm Đồng Province, S Vietnam.	1961-07-21	sp.	3111936	1006796
2023-12-21	Eulipotyphla	Erinaceidae	Hylomys vorax	Leuser gymnure		IM	3°51′N 97°07′E	Tropical montane moist evergreen forest (~2408 m a.s.l.) in the foothills of the Mt. Leuser in the NW part of the island of Sumatra, ~25 km SW of the town of Blangkejeren, Gayo Lues Regency, Aceh Province, NW Indonesia.	1939-05-01	sp.	3111935	1006799
2024-01-25	Eulipotyphla	Soricidae	Crocidura balingka	Balingka white-toothed shrew		IM	0°22′26″S 100°19′41″E	Tropical montane moist evergreen forest (~2100 m a.s.l.) on the N slope of Mt. Singgalang in the W part of the island of Sumatra, S of the settlement of Balingka, ~8 km SW of the city of Bukittinggi, Agam Regency, West Sumatra Province, W Indonesia.	2018-11-23	sp.	3138799	1006830
2024-01-25	Eulipotyphla	Soricidae	Crocidura barapi	Barapi white-toothed shrew		IM	0°05′12″N 99°58′08″E	Tropical montane moist evergreen forest (~2004 m a.s.l.) on the NW slope of the Mt. Talamau, E of the settlement of Lubuak Landua Aua Kuniang, Pasaman District, West Pasaman Regency, West Sumatra Province, W Indonesia.	2018-04-21	sp.	3138800	1006831
2024-01-25	Eulipotyphla	Soricidae	Crocidura dewi	Dewi white-toothed shrew		IM	0°23′42″S 100°20′01″E	Tropical montane moist evergreen forest (~2826 m a.s.l.) on the S shore of the crater lake of Telago Dewi on the summit of the Mt. Singgalang in the W part of the island of Sumatra, S of the settlement of Balingka, ~10 km SW of the city of Bukittinggi, Agam Regency, West Sumatra Province, W Indonesia.	2018-12-04	sp.	3138801	1006832
2024-02-21	Chiroptera	Vespertilionidae	Corynorhinus leonpaniaguae	Paniagua's big-eared bat		NA	25°09′39″N 100°37′23″W	Subtropical montane xeric shrubland (~2072 m a.s.l.) at the Cave El Hundido, ~2.5 km NE of the settlement of Puerto Grande, Galeana Municipality, Nuevo León State, C Mexico.	2022-04-18	sp.		1006835
2024-02-22	Rodentia	Muridae	Pseudomys pilbarensis	Pilbara delicate mouse		AU	20°37′00″S 117°10′50″E	Tropical coastal xeric shrubland (~5 m a.s.l.) at the port facility of Cape Lambert, City of Karratha, Western Australia, NW Australia.		sp.		1006828
2024-02-27	Rodentia	Cricetidae	Oligoryzomys gri	Tiny pygmy rice rat		NT	9°19′15″S 63°19′15″W	Disturbed tropical lowland moist semi-deciduous broadleaf forest (~108 m a.s.l.) at Fazenda do Seu Bento, ~40 km N of the town of Alto Paraíso, Rondônia State, W Brazil.	2005-07-20	sp.		1006837
2024-02-27	Rodentia	Cricetidae	Oligoryzomys gri apinaye	Tiny pygmy rice rat (apinaye)		NT	5°15′20″S 48°23′37″W	Disturbed tropical lowland moist evergreen broadleaf forest (~100 m a.s.l.) on the left bank of the Tocantins River, Fazenda Osara II, ~15 W of the town of São Sebastião do Tocantins, Tocantins State, E Brazil.	1997-09	ssp.		1006837
2024-03-01	Artiodactyla	Cervidae	Pudella carlae	Peruvian Yungas pudu		NT	6°23′18″S 77°13′57″W	Tropical montane moist evergreen broadleaf forest (~2360 m a.s.l.) on the left bank of the Copla Creek on the E slope the Andes, ~27 km E of the town of Mendoza, Amazonas Department, NW Peru.	2009-12-10	sp.		1006838
2024-03-01	Chiroptera	Phyllostomidae	Vampyressa villai	Villa's little yellow-eared bat		NT	16°47′40″N 98°56′00″W	Tropical upland dry semi-deciduous broadleaf forest (~418 m a.s.l.) on the left bank of the Coacoyulichán River, near the town of Coacoyulichán, Cuautepec Municipality, Guerrero State, SW Mexico.		sp.		1006846
2024-03-05	Rodentia	Calomyscidae	Calomyscus darvishi	Darvish's brush-tailed mouse		PA	33°09′04″N 50°08′42″E	Temperate montane semi-arid shrubland (~2800 m a.s.l.) in the central part of the Zagros Mountains, ~20 km N of the town of Fereydunshahr, Isfahan Province, C Iran.	2016-07	sp.	3369752	1006843
2024-03-05	Rodentia	Calomyscidae	Calomyscus kiabii	Atropatene brush-tailed mouse		PA	36°50′56″N 45°08′39″E	Temperate montane semi-arid shrubland (~1647 m a.s.l.) at the village of Kulij, Piranshahr County, NW Iran.	2016-06	sp.	3092529	1006844
2024-03-08	Rodentia	Ctenomyidae	Ctenomys uco	Uco tuco-tuco		NT	33°37′17″S 69°30′40″W	Temperate montane xeric shrubland (~2710 m a.s.l.) on the right bank of a small stream that runs alongside the local road in the SE part of the Andes, Cajón de Arenales, ~41 km W of the town of Tunuyán, Tunuyán Department, Mendoza Province, SW Argentina.	2023-04-28	sp.	3138260	1006839
2024-03-11	Rodentia	Sciuridae	Spermophilus vorontsovi	Vorontsov's ground squirrel		PA	54°50′N 84°44′E	Temperate lowland forest steppe (~190 m a.s.l.) of SC Siberia, near the village of Konevo, Toguchinsky District, Novosibirsk Region, C Russia.	1965-06-21	sp.		1006842
2024-03-14	Eulipotyphla	Soricidae	Soriculus beibengensis	Beibeng large-clawed shrew		IM	29°13′08″N 95°11′20″E	Temperate montane mixed broadleaf forest (~1610 m a.s.l.) of the SE Himalayas, near the town of Beibeng, Medog County, Nyingchi Prefecture, TAR, SW China.	2023-04-08	sp.	3116655	1006845
2024-03-25	Chiroptera	Rhinolophidae	Rhinolophus cervenyi	Červený's horseshoe bat		AF	29°52′02″S 29°07′15″E	Small cave on the slope of the subtropical montane grassland (~2417 m a.s.l.) at the old park lodge of the Sehlabathebe National Park, Qacha's Nek District, SE Lesotho.	2013-02-17	sp.		1006850
2024-04-03	Rodentia	Heteromyidae	Chaetodipus artus australis	Narrow-skulled pocket mouse (australis)		NT	23°54′43″N 106°27′54″W	Subtropical lowland dry deciduous woodland (~258 m a.s.l.) adjacent to the pacific foothills of the S part of the Sierra Madre Occidental mountain range, ~5 km SW of the town of San Ignacio, Sinaloa State, NW Mexico.	1963-07-19	ssp.		1001929
2024-04-03	Rodentia	Heteromyidae	Chaetodipus goldmani cuchujaquiensis	Goldman's pocket mouse (cuchujaquiensis)		NA	26°55′48″N 109°25′01″W	Subtropical lowland dry deciduous woodland (~47 m a.s.l.) adjacent to the pacific foothills of the middle part of the Sierra Madre Occidental mountain range, ~15 km S of the city center of Navojoa, Sonora State, NW Mexico.	1997-08-24	ssp.		1001937
2024-04-03	Rodentia	Heteromyidae	Chaetodipus goldmani yaquiensis	Goldman's pocket mouse (yaquiensis)		NA	28°59′N 109°25′W	Subtropical upland dry deciduous woodland (~500 m a.s.l.) in the pacific foothills of the N part of the Sierra Madre Occidental mountain range, ~1 km W of the town of Bacanora, Sonora State, NW Mexico.	1975-07-17	ssp.		1001937
2024-04-03	Rodentia	Ctenomyidae	Ctenomys miguelchristie	Miguel Christie's tuco-tuco		NT	35°49′00″S 69°40′42″W	Temperate montane xeric shrubland (~1641 m a.s.l.) alongside the highway, ~15 km by road NE of the settlement of Bardas Blancas, Malargüe Department, Mendoza Province, SW Argentina.	2019-04-23	sp.		1006851
2024-04-18	Rodentia	Cricetidae	Oecomys galvez	Río Gálvez arboreal rice rat		NT	5°15′S 73°10′W	Tropical lowland moist evergreen broadleaf forest (~150 m a.s.l.) at Nuevo San Juan, near Matsés National Reserve, Requena Province, Loreto Department, NE Peru.	1998-05-20	sp.		1006855
2024-04-18	Rodentia	Cricetidae	Oecomys makampi	Matses arboreal rice rat		NT	5°15′S 73°10′W	Tropical lowland moist evergreen broadleaf forest (~150 m a.s.l.) at Nuevo San Juan, near the Matsés National Reserve, Requena Province, Loreto Department, NE Peru.	1999-08-31	sp.		1006856
2024-04-18	Rodentia	Cricetidae	Oecomys nanus	Dwarf arboreal rice rat		NT	4°55′S 73°40′W	Tropical lowland moist evergreen broadleaf forest edge (~100 m a.s.l.) on the right bank of the Ucayali River, near the town of Jenaro Herrera, Requena Province, Loreto Department, NE Peru.	2003-06-21	sp.		1006857
2024-04-18	Rodentia	Sciuridae	Sciurus pachecoi	Pacheco's squirrel		NT	3°32′00″S 72°11′00″W	Tropical lowland seasonally flooded forest (~100 m a.s.l.) at the mouth of the Orosa River on the right bank of the Amazon River, near the village of San José de Orosa, Loreto Department, NE Peru.	1926-06-21	sp.		1006853
2024-04-25	Rodentia	Heteromyidae	Chaetodipus siccus liaae	Lia pocket mouse		NT	23°59′57″N 109°52′14″W	Subtropical lowland xeric shrubland (~100 m a.s.l.) in the SE part of the peninsula of Baja California, ~4 km W of the coastal locality of Ensenada de Muertos, Baja California Sur, NW México.	2000-10-01	ssp.		1001945
2024-05-15	Rodentia	Muridae	Rattus ombirah	Obi Island rat		AU	1°36′43″S 127°42′38″E	Tropical montane moist evergreen broadleaf forest (970 m a.s.l.) on the Mt. Sere in the S part of the island of Obi, North Maluku Province, E Indonesia.	2013-10-27	sp.		1006783
2024-05-25	Rodentia	Muridae	Tarsomys orientalis	Kampalili moss mouse		IM	7°17′12″N 126°16′31″E	Tropical montane moist evergreen broadleaf forest (~1900 m a.s.l.) on the SW slope of the Mt. Kampalili in the SE part of the island of Mindanao, ~16 km SEE of the town of Maragusan, Davao de Oro Province, SE Philippines.	2007-05-24	sp.		1006867
2024-06-10	Chiroptera	Molossidae	Molossus paranaensis	Paraná River mastiff bat		NT	31°25′33″S 60°59′28″W	Lowland agricultural area (44 m a.s.l.) alongside the local road, ~5 km W of the town of Esperanza, Las Colonias Department Santa Fe Province, C Argentina.	2018-01-20	sp.		1006870
2024-06-22	Cingulata	Dasypodidae	Dasypus guianensis	Guianan long-nosed armadillo		NT	5°03′45″N 53°02′51″W	Tropical lowland moist evergreen broadleaf forest (~100 m a.s.l.) on the right bank of the Sinnamary River, near the Petit-Saut Dam, Sinnamary Commune, N French Guiana.	1998	sp.	3163393	1006876
2024-07-12	Eulipotyphla	Soricidae	Notiosorex carrawayae	Carraway's gray shrew		NA	24°42′36″N 104°01′52″W	Subtropical montane xeric shrubland (~1677 m a.s.l.) located ~8 km S of the town of Peñón Blanco, Durango State, NW México.	2016-12-20	sp.		1006884
2024-08-06	Chiroptera	Vespertilionidae	Chalinolobus orarius	Coastal wattled bat		AU	9°26′46″S 147°11′56″E	Lowland rural area (~100 m a.s.l.) at Gordon (a suburb of the coastal city of Port Moresby) surrounded by the tropical moist evergreen broad forest, National Capital District, SE Papua New Guinea.	1984-06-07	sp.		1006874
2024-08-15	Chiroptera	Vespertilionidae	Murina yuanyang	Yuanyang tube-nosed bat		IM	22°59′24″N 102°59′24″E	Disturbed tropical montane moist evergreen broadleaf forest (~2434 m a.s.l.) at Pinghe, ~3.5 km SW of the town of Xiaoxinjie, Yuanyang County, Honghe Prefecture, Yunnan Province, SW China.	2023-05-21	sp.		1006901
2024-08-29	Eulipotyphla	Soricidae	Crocidura binco	Short-tailed Salonga white-toothed shrew		AF	1°39′57″S 20°31′58″E	Tropical upland swamp evergreen forest (~371 m a.s.l.) on the left bank of the Momboyo River at the Salonga National Park, ~15 km W of the village of Monkoto, Tshuapa Province, C DR Congo.	2022-12-12	sp.		1006886
2024-08-29	Eulipotyphla	Soricidae	Crocidura salonga	Long-tailed Salonga white-toothed shrew		AF	1°39′57″S 20°31′58″E	Tropical upland swamp evergreen forest (~371 m a.s.l.) on the left bank of the Momboyo River at the Salonga National Park, ~15 km W of the village of Monkoto, Tshuapa Province, C DR Congo.	2022-12-12	sp.		1006889
2024-09-12	Carnivora	Mephitidae	Conepatus semistriatus elieceri	Margaritan hog-nosed skunk		NT	11°04′N 63°53′W	Tropical upland shrubland (~400 m a.s.l.) at the Mount El Tamoco in the NE part of the island of Margarita, ~4 km E of the town of Santa Ana, Gómez Municipality, Nueva Esparta State, NE Venezuela.		ssp.		1005806
2024-09-13	Rodentia	Cricetidae	Rhagomys jequitiba	Jequitibá arboreal mouse		NT	20°29′32″S 42°03′16″W	Tropical montane moist semi-deciduous forest (~1600 m a.s.l.) at Fazenda Harmonia (a protected area of the RPPN Refúgio dos Sauás), ~12 km SW of the town of Alto Jequitibá Municipality, Minas Gerais State, SE Brazil.	2014-03-16	sp.	3396867	1006894
2024-09-13	Chiroptera	Rhinolophidae	Rhinolophus webalai	Webala's horseshoe bat		AF	3°15′17″S 40°07′55″E	Human-modified tropical coastal moist evergreen forest (~5 m a.s.l.) at the KWS Headquarters of the Malindi Marine National Park, Kilifi County, SE Kenya.	2006-05-10	sp.		1006899
2024-09-30	Eulipotyphla	Soricidae	Crocidura medogensis	Medog white-toothed shrew		IM	29°13′34″N 95°07′55″E	Temperate montane mixed broadleaf forest (~660 m a.s.l.) on the left bank of the Yalu Zangbu River, ~4 km SW of the town of Beibeng, Medog County, Nyingchi Prefecture, TAR, SW China.	2020-09	sp.		1006910
2024-09-30	Eulipotyphla	Soricidae	Crocidura zhadaensis	Zanda white-toothed shrew		PA	31°47′01″N 78°52′15″E	Temperate montane shrubland (~2980 m a.s.l.) in the W part of the Himalayas, near the town of Diyag, Zanda County, Ngari Prefecture, TAR, W China.	2019-08	sp.		1006911
2024-10-17	Rodentia	Nesomyidae	Dendromus pseudomystacalis	Ethiopian Highland African climbing mouse		AF	13°13′54″N 38°02′16″E	Tropical montane semi-evergreen woodland (~3240 m a.s.l.) at the Sankober Camp, Simien Mountains National Park, ~17 km NE of the town of Debark, North Gondar Zone, Amhara Regional State, NW Ethiopia.	2015-11-25	sp.		1006882
2024-10-17	Rodentia	Nesomyidae	Dendromus rogersi	Rogers' African climbing mouse		AF	3°10′38″S 37°26′25″E	Tropical montane moist forest (~2897 m a.s.l.) at the SE foot of the Mt. Kilimanjaro, Kilimanjaro National Park, ~14.5 km NW of the town of Marangu, Moshi District, Kilimanjaro Region, NE Tanzania.	2002-07-28	sp.		1006900
2024-10-18	Rodentia	Ctenomyidae	Ctenomys terraplen	Laguna Terraplén tuco-tuco		NT	42°57′53″S 71°29′16″W	Temperate upland semi-deciduous forest edge (~700 m a.s.l.) at the E shore of the Lake Terraplén, near the E boundary of the Los Alerces National Park, ~13 km SWW of the town of Esquel, Futaleufú Department, Chubut Province, SW Argentina.	2019-11-11	sp.		1006896
2024-10-23	Chiroptera	Vespertilionidae	Murina yushuensis	Yushu tube-nosed bat		PA	32°55′53″N 97°02′23″E	L-shaped cave on the right bank of the Batang River in the temperate montane steppe (~3770 m a.s.l.), ~8 km S of the city of Yushu, Qinghai Province, W China.	2018-12-20	sp.		1006912
2024-10-23	Rodentia	Cricetidae	Neodon lhozhagensis	Lhozhag mountain vole		IM	28°06′14″N 91°08′20″E	Temperate montane conifer forest (~3729 m a.s.l.) in the E part of the Himalayas, ~2 km SE of the town of Lakang, Lhozhag County, Shannan Prefecture, TAR, SW China.	2023-08-28	sp.		1006904
2024-10-28	Rodentia	Ctenomyidae	Ctenomys chechehet	Chechehet's tuco-tuco		NT	39°30′57″S 64°47′02″W	Disturbed temperate lowland steppe (~103 m a.s.l.) alongside the rural road, located ~30 km W from the junction with the highway, ~80 km SW of the town of Río Colorado, Pichi Mahuida Department, Río Negro Province, S Argentina.		sp.	3391698	1006897
2024-10-29	Rodentia	Platacanthomyidae	Typhlomys taxuansis	Southern tree mouse		IM	21°19′20″N 104°29′45″E	Tropical montane moist forest (~2100 m a.s.l.) at the Ta Xua Nature Reserve, ~4 km E of the Y Xoa Homestay, Bắc Yên District, Sơn La Province SW Vietnam.		sp.	3231739	1006893
2024-11-05	Rodentia	Cricetidae	Thomasomys igor	Igor's oldfield mouse		NT	1°43′00″S 78°59′00″W	Disturbed tropical montane moist forest (~2875 m a.s.l.) at the boundary of the Tatahuazo Wildlife Reserve, ~2.5 km NE of the settlement of Cruz de Lizo, San Miguel Canton, Bolívar Province, C Ecuador.	1994-07-15	sp.		1006888
2024-11-05	Rodentia	Cricetidae	Thomasomys otavalo	Otavalo's oldfield mouse		NT	0°09′16″N 78°16′31″W	Tropical montane moist forest patch (~3690 m a.s.l.) on the N shore of the Lake Mojanda at the Otavalo Mojanda Water Protection Area, ~7 km SW of the town of Otavalo, Otavalo Canton, Imbabura Province, N Ecuador.	2022-01-19	sp.		1006892
2024-11-27	Eulipotyphla	Erinaceidae	Neohylomys vietnamensis	Vietnam gymnure		IM	22°37′41″N 105°54′41″E	Tropical montane moist evergreen broadleaf forest (~850 m a.s.l.) located ~5 km SW of the settlement of Nguyên Bình, Nguyên Bình District, Cao Bằng Province, N Vietnam.	2018-06-04	sp.	3385986	1006879
2024-12-27	Eulipotyphla	Soricidae	Crocidura darvishi	Darvish's white-toothed shrew		PA	31°36′14″N 54°11′23″E	Montane xeric shrubland (~2200 m a.s.l.) near the village of Tezerjan, Yazd Province, C Iran.	2012	sp.	3421429	1006926
2024-12-27	Chiroptera	Rhinolophidae	Rhinolophus kirghisorum	Kyrgyzstan horseshoe bat		PA	40°21′13″N 72°36′34″E	Temperate montane shrubland (~1110 m a.s.l.) on the left bank of the Aravan-Saj River at the Kolodec Fersmana Mine, near the village of Kara-Koktu, Nookat District, Osh Region, SW Kirghizstan.	2024-07-25	sp.		1006933

== See also ==
- List of bird species described in the 2020s
- American Society of Mammalogists
