= List of ctenomyids =

Species in mammal family Ctenomyidae

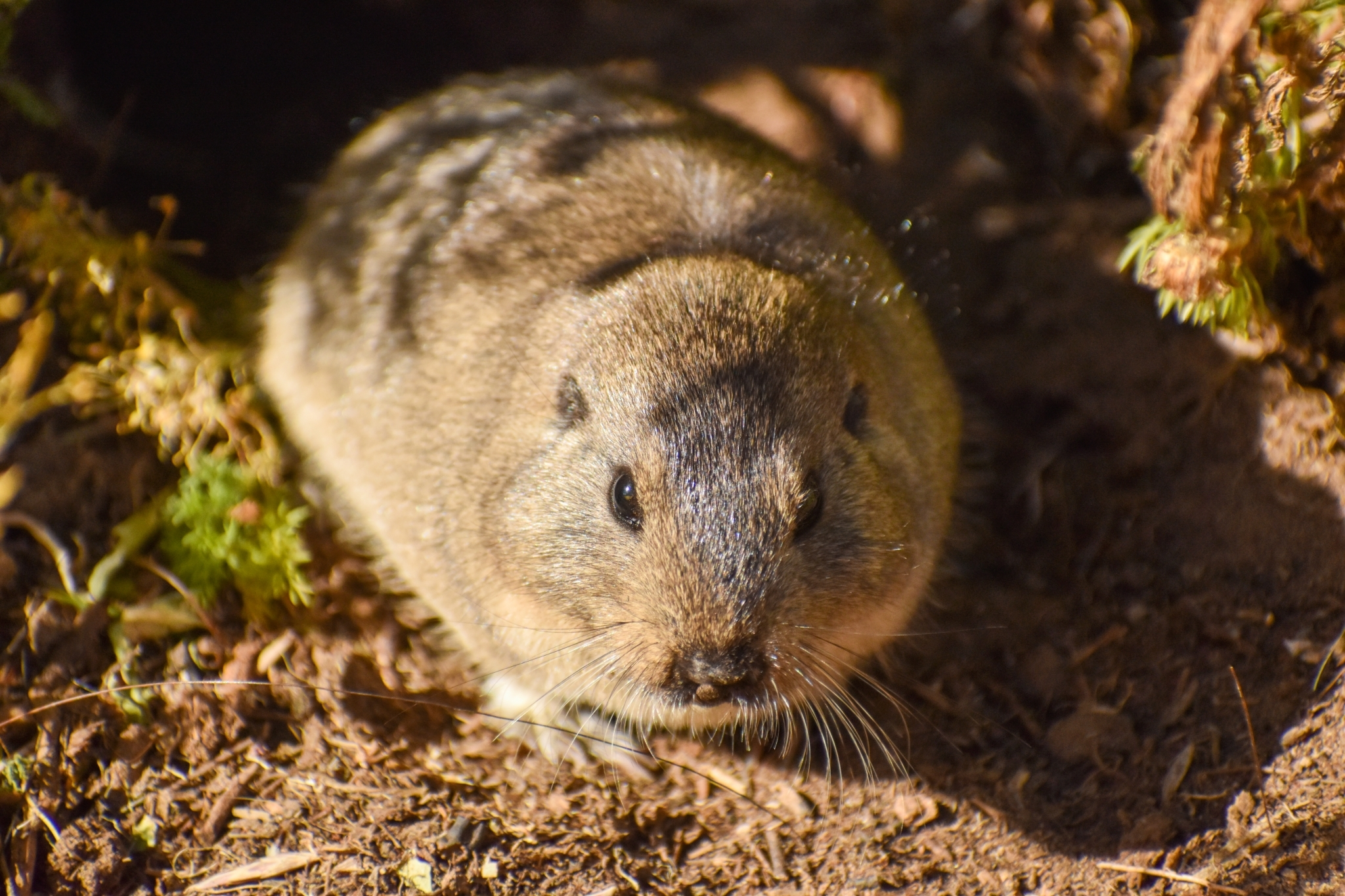
Silky tuco-tuco (Ctenomys sericeus)

Ctenomyidae is a family of fossorial mammals in the order Rodentia and part of the Caviomorpha parvorder. Members of this family are called ctenomyids, or tuco-tucos. They are found in southern South America, primarily in shrublands and grasslands, though some species can be found in forests, savannas, deserts, wetlands (including Patagonian mallíns), and coastal areas.They range in size from the white-toothed tuco-tuco, at 11 cm (4 in) plus a 7 cm (3 in) tail, to Conover's tuco-tuco, at 33 cm (13 in) plus a 11 cm (4 in) tail. Ctenomyids are herbivores and eat a wide variety of vegetation. No ctenomyids have population estimates, but eleven species are categorized as an endangered species, and four—the Peruvian tuco-tuco, Reig's tuco-tuco, Roig's tuco-tuco, and the social tuco-tuco—are categorized as critically endangered.

The 61 extant species of Ctenomyidae are all contained in a single genus, Ctenomys. A few extinct prehistoric ctenomyid species have been discovered, though due to ongoing research and discoveries, the exact number and categorization is not fixed.

== Conventions ==
IUCN Red List categories
Conservation status
- EX: Extinct (0 species)
- EW: Extinct in the wild (0 species)
- CR: Critically endangered (4 species)
- EN: Endangered (11 species)
- VU: Vulnerable (2 species)
- NT: Near threatened (5 species)
- LC: Least concern (16 species)

Other categories
- DD: Data deficient (23 species)
- NE: Not evaluated (0 species)

The author citation for the species or genus is given after the scientific name; parentheses around the author citation indicate that this was not the original taxonomic placement. Conservation status codes listed follow the International Union for Conservation of Nature (IUCN) Red List of Threatened Species. Range maps are provided wherever possible; if a range map is not available, a description of the ctenomyid's range is provided. Ranges are based on the IUCN Red List for that species unless otherwise noted.

== Classification ==
Ctenomyidae is a family consisting of 61 extant species in a single genus, Ctenomys. This does not include hybrid species or extinct prehistoric species.

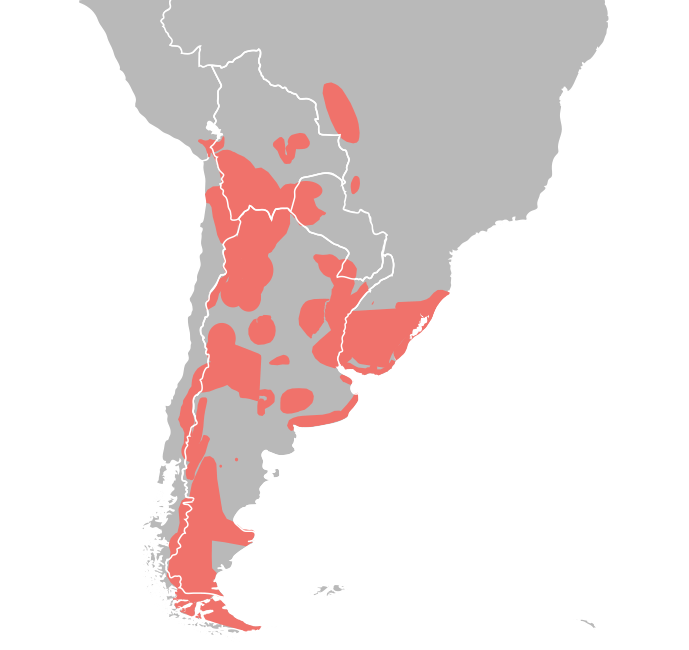
Ctenomyidae distribution

== Ctenomyids ==
The following classification is based on the taxonomy described by the reference work Mammal Species of the World (2005), with augmentation by generally accepted proposals made since using molecular phylogenetic analysis, as supported by both the IUCN and the American Society of Mammalogists.

Genus Ctenomys – Blainville, 1826 – 61 species
Common name	Scientific name and subspecies	Range	Size and ecology	IUCN status and estimated population
Argentine tuco-tuco	C. argentinus Berry & Contreras, 1982	Northern Argentina	Size: 17–18 cm (7 in) long, plus 7–9 cm (3–4 in) tail Habitat: Shrubland and grassland	NT Unknown
Azara's tuco-tuco	C. azarae Thomas, 1903	Central Argentina	Size: 16–20 cm (6–8 in) long, plus 6–9 cm (2–4 in) tail Habitat: Shrubland	EN Unknown
Berg's tuco-tuco	C. bergi Thomas, 1902	Central Argentina	Size: 13–17 cm (5–7 in) long, plus about 7 cm (3 in) tail Habitat: Savanna and grassland	EN Unknown
Bolivian tuco-tuco	C. boliviensis Waterhouse, 1848 Two subspecies: C. b. boliviensis; C. b. nattereri	Bolivia and western Brazil	Size: 18–28 cm (7–11 in) long, plus 7–10 cm (3–4 in) tail Habitat: Savanna	LC Unknown
Bonetto's tuco-tuco	C. bonettoi Berry & Contreras, 1982	Northern Argentina	Size: 17–19 cm (7 in) long, plus 6–8 cm (2–3 in) tail Habitat: Shrubland	EN Unknown
Brazilian tuco-tuco	C. brasiliensis Blainville, 1826	Uruguay	Size: Unknown Habitat: Unknown	DD Unknown
Catamarca tuco-tuco	C. knighti Thomas, 1919	Northern Argentina	Size: About 20 cm (8 in) long, plus about 8 cm (3 in) tail Habitat: Grassland	DD Unknown
Chacoan tuco-tuco	C. dorsalis Thomas, 1900	Paraguay and Bolivia	Size: About 16 cm (6 in) long, plus about 5 cm (2 in) tail Habitat: Savanna	DD Unknown
Colburn's tuco-tuco	C. colburni Allen, 1903	Southern Argentina	Size: Unknown Habitat: Grassland	DD Unknown
Collared tuco-tuco	C. torquatus Lichtenstein, 1830	Uruguay and southern Brazil	Size: 15–23 cm (6–9 in) long, plus 5–9 cm (2–4 in) tail Habitat: Forest and shrubland	LC Unknown
Conover's tuco-tuco	C. conoveri Osgood, 1946	Paraguay and Bolivia	Size: 24–33 cm (9–13 in) long, plus 9–14 cm (4–6 in) tail Habitat: Shrubland and grassland	LC Unknown
Coyhaique tuco-tuco	C. coyhaiquensis Kelt & Gallardo, 1994	Southern Argentina and southern Chile	Size: Unknown length, plus 5–9 cm (2–4 in) tail Habitat: Shrubland	DD Unknown
D'Orbigny's tuco-tuco	C. dorbignyi Contreras & Contreras, 1984	Northern Argentina	Size: 19–22 cm (7–9 in) long, plus 8–10 cm (3–4 in) tail Habitat: Shrubland and grassland	NT Unknown
Emily's tuco-tuco	C. emilianus St. Leger, 1926	Western Argentina	Size: About 21 cm (8 in) long, plus about 9 cm (4 in) tail Habitat: Desert	LC Unknown
Famatina tuco-tuco	C. famosus Thomas, 1920	Northwestern Argentina	Size: About 16 cm (6 in) long, plus about 7 cm (3 in) tail Habitat: Unknown	DD Unknown
Flamarion's tuco-tuco	C. flamarioni Travi, 1981	Uruguay and southern Brazil	Size: About 25 cm (10 in) long, plus about 7 cm (3 in) tail Habitat: Coastal marine	EN Unknown
Foch's tuco-tuco	C. fochi Thomas, 1919	Northern Argentina	Size: About 16 cm (6 in) long, plus about 8 cm (3 in) tail Habitat: Unknown	DD Unknown
Furtive tuco-tuco	C. occultus Thomas, 1920	Northern Argentina	Size: 13–16 cm (5–6 in) long, plus tail Habitat: Unknown	EN Unknown
Goodfellow's tuco-tuco	C. goodfellowi Thomas, 1921	Bolivia	Size: 18–28 cm (7–11 in) long, plus 7–10 cm (3–4 in) tail Habitat: Forest	LC Unknown
Goya tuco-tuco	C. perrensi Thomas, 1898	Northeastern Argentina	Size: About 20 cm (8 in) long, plus about 7 cm (3 in) tail Habitat: Unknown	LC Unknown
Haig's tuco-tuco	C. haigi Thomas, 1917 Two subspecies: C. h. haigi; C. h. lentulus	Western Argentina	Size: 17–20 cm (7–8 in) long, plus 8–9 cm (3–4 in) tail Habitat: Forest, grassland, and inland wetlands	LC Unknown
Highland tuco-tuco	C. opimus Wagner, 1848 Three subspecies: C. o. luteolus; C. o. nigriceps; C. o. opimus	Bolivia and northwestern Argentina	Size: 19–25 cm (7–10 in) long, plus 7–10 cm (3–4 in) tail Habitat: Grassland	LC Unknown
Ibicui tuco-tuco	C. ibicui de Freitas, Fernandes, Fornel, Roratto, 2012	Southern Brazil	Size: About 16 cm (6 in) long, plus about 8 cm (3 in) tail Habitat: Grassland	NT Unknown
Jujuy tuco-tuco	C. juris Thomas, 1920	Northern Argentina	Size: About 18 cm (7 in) long, plus about 7 cm (3 in) tail Habitat: Unknown	DD Unknown
Lago Blanco tuco-tuco	C. fodax Thomas, 1910	Southern Argentina and southern Chile	Size: About 26 cm (10 in) long, plus about 10 cm (4 in) tail Habitat: Grassland	DD Unknown
Laguna Terraplén tuco-tuco	C. terraplen Brook, González, Tomasco, Verzi, & Martin, 2024	Western Argentina	Size: Unknown Habitat: Forest	VU Unknown
Lami tuco-tuco	C. lami Freitas, 2001	Southern Brazil	Size: 16–22 cm (6–9 in) long, plus 6–10 cm (2–4 in) tail Habitat: Coastal marine	VU Unknown
Lewis's tuco-tuco	C. lewisi Thomas, 1926	Southern Bolivia	Size: 20–22 cm (8–9 in) long, plus 6–8 cm (2–3 in) tail Habitat: Grassland	LC Unknown
Magellanic tuco-tuco	C. magellanicus Bennett, 1836 Four subspecies: C. m. dicki; C. m. fueginus; C. m. magellanicus; C. m. osgoodi	Southern Argentina and southern Chile	Size: Unknown Habitat: Grassland	LC Unknown
Maule tuco-tuco	C. maulinus Philippi, 1872 Two subspecies: C. m. brunneus; C. m. maulinus	Central Chile	Size: Unknown Habitat: Grassland	LC Unknown
Mendoza tuco-tuco	C. mendocinus Philippi, 1869	Central Argentina	Size: 16–20 cm (6–8 in) long, plus 6–9 cm (2–4 in) tail Habitat: Shrubland, grassland, and inland wetlands	LC Unknown
Mottled tuco-tuco	C. latro Thomas, 1918	Northern Argentina	Size: 16–18 cm (6–7 in) long, plus tail Habitat: Shrubland and grassland	EN Unknown
Pearson's tuco-tuco	C. pearsoni Lessa & Langguth, 1983	Southern Uruguay	Size: 17–20 cm (7–8 in) long, plus 7–9 cm (3–4 in) tail Habitat: Shrubland, grassland, and coastal marine	NT Unknown
Peruvian tuco-tuco	C. peruanus Sanborn & Pearson, 1947	Southern Peru	Size: About 22 cm (9 in) long, plus about 9 cm (4 in) tail Habitat: Grassland	CR 1–50
Pilar tuco-tuco	C. pilarensis Contreras, 1993	Northern Argentina and Paraguay	Size: 16–21 cm (6–8 in) long, plus tail Habitat: Grassland	EN Unknown
Plebiscite tuco-tuco	C. plebiscitum Brook, Tomasco, González, & Martin, 2021	Futaleufú Department in Argentina	Size: About 25 cm (10 in) long, plus about 8 cm (3 in) tail Habitat: Shrubland and mallíns	EN unknown
Porteous's tuco-tuco	C. porteousi Thomas, 1916	Central Argentina	Size: 16–20 cm (6–8 in) long, plus 6–9 cm (2–4 in) tail Habitat: Grassland	NT Unknown
Pundt's tuco-tuco	C. pundti Nehring, 1900	Central Argentina	Size: About 17 cm (7 in) long, plus about 4 cm (2 in) tail Habitat: Grassland	EN Unknown
Puntilla tuco-tuco	C. coludo Thomas, 1920	Northwestern Argentina	Size: About 20 cm (8 in) long, plus about 10 cm (4 in) tail Habitat: Unknown	DD Unknown
Reddish tuco-tuco	C. frater Thomas, 1902 Two subspecies: C. f. frater; C. f. mordosus	Bolivia and northern Argentina	Size: 17–20 cm (7–8 in) long, plus 5–9 cm (2–4 in) tail Habitat: Grassland	LC Unknown
Reig's tuco-tuco	C. osvaldoreigi Contreras, 1995	Central Argentina	Size: 23–25 cm (9–10 in) long, plus tail Habitat: Grassland	CR Unknown
Rio Negro tuco-tuco	C. rionegrensis Langguth & Abella, 1970	Eastern Argentina and Uruguay	Size: 16–19 cm (6–7 in) long, plus 6–9 cm (2–4 in) tail Habitat: Desert and coastal marine	EN Unknown
Robust tuco-tuco	C. tuconax Thomas, 1925	Northern Argentina	Size: Unknown Habitat: Savanna, shrubland, and grassland	DD Unknown
Roig's tuco-tuco	C. roigi Contreras, 1988	Northern Argentina	Size: 17–20 cm (7–8 in) long, plus 7–10 cm (3–4 in) tail Habitat: Grassland, inland wetlands, and other	CR Unknown
Salta tuco-tuco	C. saltarius Thomas, 1912	Northern Argentina	Size: About 20 cm (8 in) long, plus about 9 cm (4 in) tail Habitat: Desert	DD Unknown
San Juan tuco-tuco	C. johannis Thomas, 1921	Western Argentina	Size: About 20 cm (8 in) long, plus about 10 cm (4 in) tail Habitat: Unknown	DD Unknown
San Luis tuco-tuco	C. pontifex Thomas, 1918	Central Argentina and central Chile	Size: About 18 cm (7 in) long, plus about 8 cm (3 in) tail Habitat: Unknown	DD Unknown
Scaglia's tuco-tuco	C. scagliai Contreras, 1999	Northern Argentina	Size: About 20 cm (8 in) long, plus about 9 cm (4 in) tail Habitat: Unknown	DD Unknown
Sierra Tontal tuco-tuco	C. tulduco Thomas, 1921	Western Argentina	Size: About 19 cm (7 in) long, plus about 7 cm (3 in) tail Habitat: Unknown	DD Unknown
Silky tuco-tuco	C. sericeus Allen, 1903	Southern Argentina and southern Chile	Size: Unknown length, plus 5–9 cm (2–4 in) tail Habitat: Forest	DD Unknown
Social tuco-tuco	C. sociabilis Pearson & Christie, 1985	Central Argentina and central Chile	Size: 16–25 cm (6–10 in) long, plus 6–8 cm (2–3 in) tail Habitat: Savanna and inland wetlands	CR Unknown
Southern tuco-tuco	C. australis Rusconi, 1934	Eastern Argentina	Size: About 21 cm (8 in) long, plus 9–11 cm (4 in) tail Habitat: Coastal marine	EN Unknown
Steinbach's tuco-tuco	C. steinbachi Thomas, 1907	Bolivia	Size: 23–25 cm (9–10 in) long, plus tail Habitat: Savanna	LC Unknown
Strong tuco-tuco	C. validus Contreras, Roig, & Suzarte, 1977	Central Argentina	Size: Unknown Habitat: Unknown	DD Unknown
Talas tuco-tuco	C. talarum Thomas, 1898 Four subspecies: C. t. antonii; C. t. occidentalis; C. t. recessus; C. t. talarum	Central and eastern Argentina	Size: 15–18 cm (6–7 in) long, plus 5–8 cm (2–3 in) tail Habitat: Grassland and coastal marine	LC Unknown
Tawny tuco-tuco	C. fulvus Philippi, 1860 Two subspecies: C. f. fulvus; C. f. robustus	Western South America	Size: Unknown Habitat: Forest and desert	DD Unknown
Tiny tuco-tuco	C. minutus Nehring, 1887 Two subspecies: C. m. bicolor; C. m. minutus	Southern Brazil	Size: About 7 cm (3 in) long, plus tail Habitat: Shrubland and grassland	DD Unknown
Tucuman tuco-tuco	C. tucumanus Thomas, 1900	Northern Argentina	Size: About 17 cm (7 in) long, plus about 7 cm (3 in) tail Habitat: Forest	DD Unknown
Vipos tuco-tuco	C. viperinus Thomas, 1926	Northern Argentina	Size: About 21 cm (8 in) long, plus about 8 cm (3 in) tail Habitat: Unknown	DD Unknown
White-toothed tuco-tuco	C. leucodon Waterhouse, 1848	Western Bolivia and southern Peru	Size: 11–18 cm (4–7 in) long, plus 7–9 cm (3–4 in) tail Habitat: Shrubland and grassland	LC Unknown
Yolanda's tuco-tuco	C. yolandae Contreras & Berry, 1984	Northern Argentina	Size: Unknown Habitat: Unknown	DD Unknown

== Sources ==
- Chernasky, Amy; Motis, Anna; Burgin, Connor, eds. (2023). All the Mammals of the World. Lynx Nature Books. ISBN 978-84-16728-66-4.
- Nowak, Ronald M. (1999). Walker's Mammals of the World. Vol. 2 (6th ed.). Johns Hopkins University Press. ISBN 978-0-8018-5789-8.
- Woods, Charles A.; Kilpatrick, C. William (2005). Wilson, Don E.; Reeder, DeeAnn M. (eds.). Mammal Species of the World. Vol. 2 (3rd ed.). Johns Hopkins University Press. ISBN 978-0-8018-8221-0.
- Brook, Federico; Tomasco, Ivanna H.; González, Baltazar; Martin, Gabriel M. (2021). "A new species of Ctenomys (Rodentia: Ctenomyidae) from Patagonia related to C. sociabilis". Journal of Mammalian Evolution. 29 (1). doi:10.1007/s10914-021-09570-9.
