= Kampalili moss mouse =

Scientific classification
- Kingdom: Animalia
- Phylum: Chordata
- Class: Mammalia
- Order: Rodentia
- Family: Muridae
- Genus: Tarsomys
- Species: T. orientalis

Binomial name
- Tarsomys orientalis Rickart, Rowsey, Ibañez, Quidlat, Balete, & Heaney, 2024
- Distribution of T. orientalis in Mindanao, Philippines

Species of rodent

The Kampalili moss mouse (Tarsomys orientalis), also known as the Kampalili tarsomys, is a species of rodent in the family Muridae. At just 5 in (130 mm) long, it is the smallest species of the Mindanao-endemic genus Tarsomys, and the third to be discovered. The species was distinguished from the other members of its genus, namely Tarsomys apoensis and T. echinatus, by the smaller size of its body, significantly shorter tail, smaller size of hind feet, the soft and dense pelage that is darker in color, its smaller skull that has a broader zygomatic plate, shorter incisive foramina, and much longer auditory bullae.

The species was found in Mt. Kampalili, within the Kampalili-Puting Bato Key Biodiversity Area in eastern Mindanao Island, Philippines.

== Habitat and distribution ==
The species is known to inhabit cool, damp mossy forests. The holotype specimen (FMNH 194803) was collected several kilometers southwest of the peak of Mt. Kampalili, in the Municipality of Maragusan, at 1,900 m (6,200 ft).

== Taxonomy ==
The holotype of this species was included in the study by Rowsey et al. (2022), as Tarsomys sp.

== Ecology ==
This species occurs alongside the critically endangered Philippine Eagle, and two other mammal species, the Kampalili shrew mouse, and the Eastern Mindanao gymnure. These species share their habitat with the Mandaya and Mansaka indigenous communities.

== See also ==
- List of living mammal species described in the 2020s
