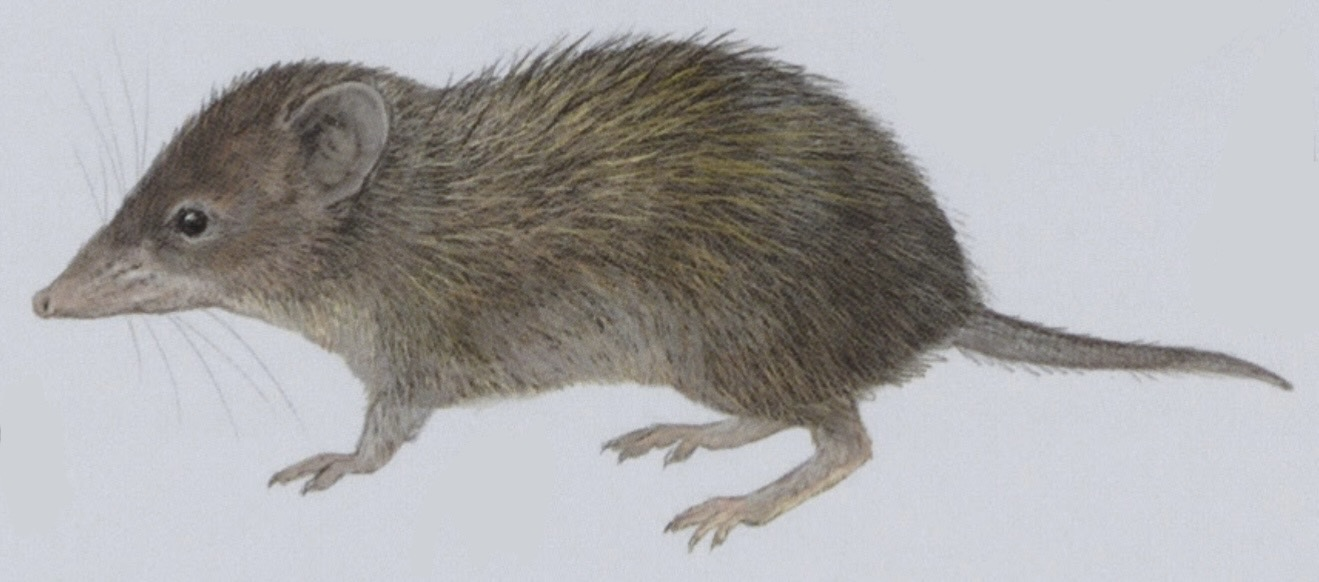

Conservation status
- Least Concern (IUCN 3.1)

Scientific classification
- Kingdom: Animalia
- Phylum: Chordata
- Class: Mammalia
- Order: Eulipotyphla
- Family: Erinaceidae
- Genus: Podogymnura
- Species: P. truei

Binomial name
- Podogymnura truei Mearns, 1905
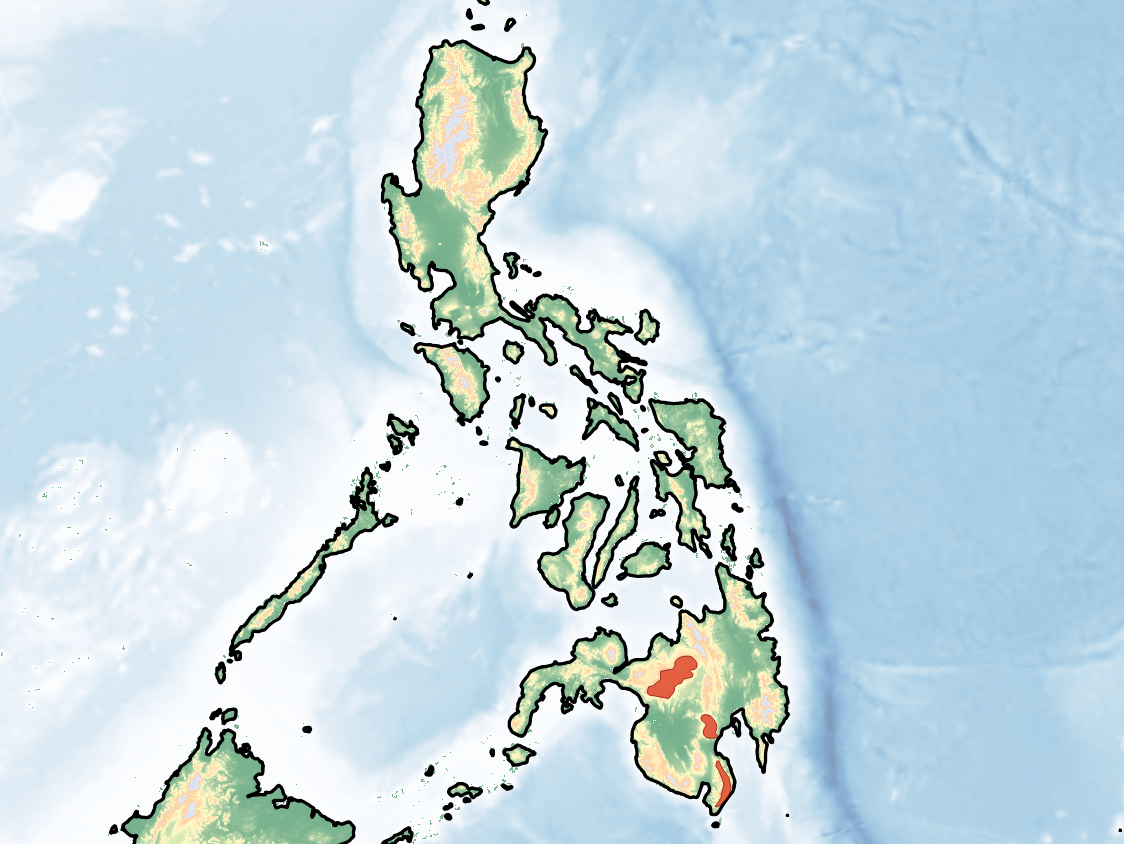

= Podogymnura truei =

Species of mammal

Podogymnura truei, also known as the Mindanao gymnure, Mindanao moonrat, or Mindanao wood shrew, is a mammal of the family Erinaceidae. It is endemic to the Mindanao islands of the Philippines. Erinaceidae is a family of small mammals that include the gymnures, also known as the silky furred moonrats, and the hedgehogs. Animals belonging to this family are significant because they are among the oldest known placental mammals that are alive. Gymnures are relatives of hedgehogs but lack the prickly spines. Four species are categorized in the genus Podogymnura: P. aureospinula, P. intermedia, P. minima, and P. truei. All share a close resemblance to the moonrat Echinosorex gymnura, which is commonly found on the Borneo, Sumatra, and the Malay Peninsulas.

== Description ==
Podogymnura truei, which are endothermic species, are medium-sized ground dwellers that typically range from 130 to 150 mm in body length. Their body is narrow, which may have been an adaptation for burrowing through narrow crevices and have bilateral symmetry. These mammals also have long soft fur that is typically gray mixed with coarser reddish brown hairs on the dorsal side. On the ventral side the hairs have a grayish white tone with some brown mixed in. Long whiskers protrude out of a long snout, which allows for exceptional tactile sensation. Similar to other mammals, chemical cues and sense of smell are used extensively for survival. The face is commonly spotted with black stripes or spots near the eyes. A sturdy tail, which is typically about 40–70 mm long, is covered moderately with hair. Underneath the hair, the skin displays a yellowish-brown, and purple coloration. At the hind legs, the fur is less prominent and the skin displays a naked peach tone. The hind foot is usually 31 to 37 mm. They have a well-developed anal gland that produces and secretes an unpleasant odor to deter predators away. This scent is pungent, often described as a rancid onion or garlic smell. Females are typically larger than males. Overall, the Mindanao gymnure is smaller than P. aureospinula. Podogymnura are closely related to Echinosorex in that they share similar dental and cranial characteristics, well-developed canine teeth, and a long rostrum. However, unlike Echinosorex, Podogymnura has less prominent sagittal, temporal, and nuchal crests, and is smaller with a shorter tail.

== Diet and behavior ==
Since Podogymnura truei are ground dwellers, their typical diet includes earthworms, insects, and arthropods. Although primarily carnivorous, they will occasionally eat fungi and fruit. P. truei are nocturnal or crepuscular, which means that they remain in their burrows during the day, but come out to forage by searching the forest floor at twilight or night. Foraging with little visibility requires their sense of smell to be their primary sense. They exhibit more similar behaviors to that of the elusive shrews than their spiky relatives. P. truei move faster but are not as efficient at digging as hedgehogs. They are also territorial and live in solitude, with exception to breeding season. In order to mark their territory or to deter predators, they will release a strong odor, typically described as a rancid onion or garlic smell.

== Reproduction and life span ==
Mindanao moonrats hold onto territories and usually live in solitude with exception to breeding seasons. Breeding typically occurs with two litters annually. Average litter size is two offspring with an average gestation period of about 35–40 days. After giving birth, females will nurse and care for their young until the offspring is weaned. On average, the life span of the Mindanao moonrat is about 55 months.

== Habitat and ecology ==
Podogymnura truei is endemic to the Philippine island of Mindanao. Within the Mindanao island, it is only found in the provinces Davao Norte, Bukidnon, and Davao del Sur, which all contain mountainous forests. Podogymnura truei prefer areas that are damp and are frequently found near standing bodies of water. They are found in abundance in the mossy forests (2000 to 2900 m), but are also dispersed among mountains and primary forests (1300 to 2000 m). Other areas of habitation include dense vegetation on the edges of streams, in thick moss-covered roots, underneath grass beds at the edge of a lake, by logs in dense fern undergrowth, among tangled tree roots, by tree trunks that have been hollowed out, and near boulders in densely fern covered valleys. Their habitats are similar to true shrews. The Mindanao moonrat helps with the highland ecosystems of Mindanao by regulating insect populations.

== Major threats ==
The potential major threat to the Mindanao moonrat population is habitat destruction. The Mindanao island is currently affected by slash and burn agriculture, forest degradation, and logging. Habitat destruction is most prominent in low level forests, which could be a problem for the Mindanao moonrat if this destruction escalates to the highland regions. However, since they primarily reside in high elevation forests, current populations are estimated to be stable. Although the population is currently stable, the fate of Mindanao moonrat is directly linked to the survival of the forests of Mindanao. According to Ridge and Reefs biodiversity report, Mindanao has a lush geographical profile. It is the 2nd largest island and has 4 out of 6 mountain ranges that reach altitudes greater than 9000 ft. The forest cover is about 30,960 km^{2}, which is approximately 24% of the total land area. The islands two marshlands include Ligawasan Marsh and the Agusan Marsh. Both contain a wide spectrum of ecological diversity and vegetation types. Mindanao is the most diverse island in the Philippines. Unfortunately, the forest has already been reduced by 29 percent due to the effects of slash and burn agriculture and logging. The remainder of the forest continues to be destroyed and degraded through several means. First of all, primary forests are being cut down and replaced with exotic trees for the paper industry. Illegal logging is being practiced even within areas that are supposed to be protected. Habitat deforestation could affect the moonrats if forest degradation continues to affect areas of higher elevation. For now, about 80% of its habitat is still in its original condition, with no human threats to the species because of its low commercial value.

== Conservation ==
According to the IUCN Red List, Podogymnura truei are under the category of least concern. However, this status could elevate to the next level if habitat destruction continues to escalate. The best way to prevent this species from becoming endangered and to maintain its current status is through conserving its habitat. There are other efforts being made to optimize biodiversity and promote habitat conservation. Currently, national environmental laws in the Philippines are embodied in the following: international doctrines and principles, administrative orders, judicial decisions, local ordinances, republic acts, executive orders, and the 1987 Philippine Constitution.
