= Vernaya =

Vernaya Temporal range: Late Pliocene to Recent

Scientific classification
- Kingdom: Animalia
- Phylum: Chordata
- Class: Mammalia
- Infraclass: Placentalia
- Order: Rodentia
- Family: Muridae
- Subfamily: Murinae
- Genus: Vernaya; Anthony, 1941

Type species
- Chiropodomys fulvus G. M. Allen, 1927

Species
- 4 extinct, 4 extant, see text

Genus of rodents

Vernaya is a genus of rodent in the subfamily Murinae from southern China and northern Burma. It contains a four extant species, the red climbing mouse (Vernaya fulva), V. foramena, V. meiguites, V. nushanensis, and several extinct species, all described by Zheng in 1993, namely Vernaya prefulva, V. pristina, V. giganta and V. wushanica. The genus is named after Arthur Stannard Vernay who collected the specimen of V. fulva on an expedition to Burma with Charles Suydam Cutting.

== Species ==
- Extant species
  - Vernaya foramena Wang, Hu, & Chen 1980
  - Vernaya fulva Anthony, 1941 - Vernay's climbing mouse.
  - Vernaya meiguites Zhao et al., 2023
  - Vernaya nushanensis Zhao et al., 2023
- Extinct species
  - †Vernaya prefulva Zheng, 1993
  - †Vernaya pristina Zheng, 1993
  - †Vernaya giganta Zheng, 1993
  - †Vernaya wushanica Zheng, 1993
