= Red climbing mouse =

Conservation status
- Least Concern (IUCN 3.1)

Scientific classification
- Kingdom: Animalia
- Phylum: Chordata
- Class: Mammalia
- Order: Rodentia
- Family: Muridae
- Genus: Vernaya
- Species: V. fulva

Binomial name
- Vernaya fulva G.M. Allen, 1927
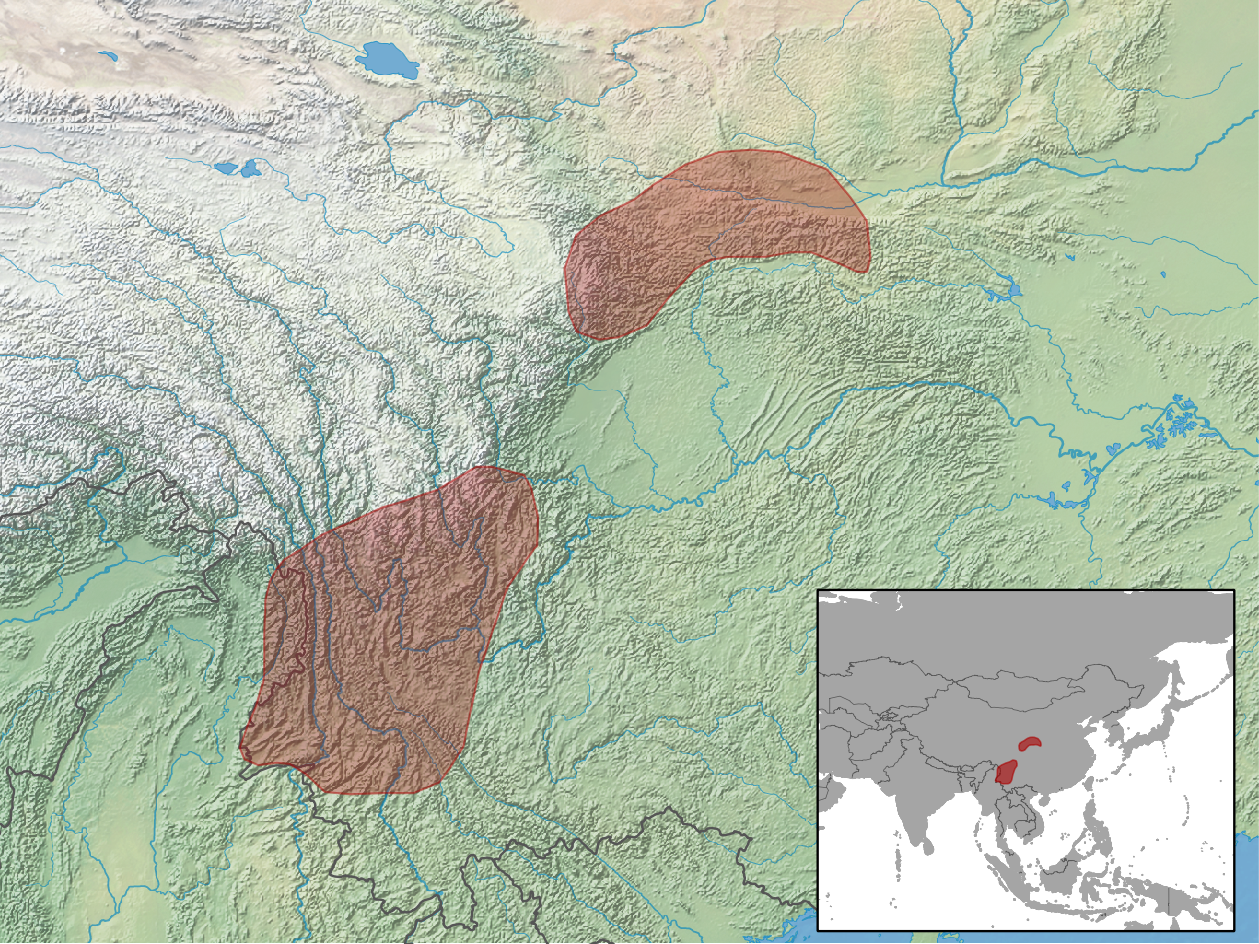

Synonyms
- Octopodomys fulvus Vernaya foramena

Species of rodent

The red climbing mouse (Vernaya fulva), also known as Vernay's climbing mouse, is a species of rodent in the family Muridae. It is named after explorer and antiques dealer, Arthur Vernay, who sponsored the expedition during which the animal was first discovered. It is the only living species in the genus Vernaya, and has no subspecies.

== Distribution ==
Red climbing mice found in southern China, in the provinces of Yunnan, Gansu, Sichuan, and Shaanxi and in northern Myanmar. It inhabits mountainous terrain at elevations between 2,100 and 2,700 metres (6,900 and 8,900 ft). Four extinct species of the genus Vernaya are also known, all discovered in Pleistocene deposits from southern China, alongside fossils of V. fulva.

== Description ==
Only a few specimens of red climbing mice have been recorded by scientists. The specimens indicate that is a relatively small mouse, with a head-body length of between 58 and 75 millimetres (2.3 and 3.0 in). The fur has been described as soft and fluffy and merges from a brownish-orange colour along the middle of the black to a rich orange on the flanks, neck, shoulders, and the sides of the face. The underparts are pale buff in colour, while the ears are brown. The tail is far longer than the body, ranging from 12 to 13 centimetres (4.7 to 5.1 in) in length, and is dark brown in colour and almost naked, with no visible tuft. The feet have orange fur on the upper surface, and paler beneath; all the toes have sharp claws, except for the first digit of the forepaws, which instead bear flattened nails.

Judging from the locations where specimens have been captured, the animal inhabits dense vegetation, such as low shrubbery and bracken.
