= Podogymnura =

Scientific classification
- Domain: Eukaryota
- Kingdom: Animalia
- Phylum: Chordata
- Class: Mammalia
- Order: Eulipotyphla
- Family: Erinaceidae
- Subfamily: Galericinae
- Genus: Podogymnura; Mearns, 1905

Type species
- Podogymnura truei Mearns, 1905

Genus of mammals

Podogymnura is a genus of mammal in the family Erinaceidae. It contains the following species:

- Dinagat moonrat (Podogymnura aureospinula)
- Eastern Mindanao gymnure (Podogymnura intermedia)
- Podogymnura minima
- Mindanao gymnure (Podogymnura truei)
