= Cuautepec =

City in the Mexican state of Guerrero

- Municipal seat and city
- Location in Mexico Cuautepec (Mexico)
- Coordinates: 16°42′N 99°0′W
- Country: Mexico
- State: Guerrero
- Municipality: Cuautepec
- Time zone: UTC-6 (Zona Centro)

Cuautepec is a city and seat of the municipality of Cuautepec, in the state of Guerrero, southern Mexico.
