= Tarsomys =

Scientific classification
- Domain: Eukaryota
- Kingdom: Animalia
- Phylum: Chordata
- Class: Mammalia
- Order: Rodentia
- Family: Muridae
- Subfamily: Murinae
- Tribe: Rattini
- Genus: Tarsomys; Mearns, 1905

Type species
- Tarsomys apoensis

Species
- Tarsomys apoensis Tarsomys echinatus Tarsomys orientalis

Genus of rodents

Tarsomys is a genus of rodent in the family Muridae found exclusively in Mindanao, Philippines.

The Mammal Diversity Database of the American Society of Mammalogists lists the following species:

- Long-footed rat (Tarsomys apoensis)
- Spiny long-footed rat (Tarsomys echinatus)
- Kampalili moss mouse (Tarsomys orientalis)
