= Peruvian tuco-tuco =

Conservation status
- Critically Endangered (IUCN 3.1)

Scientific classification
- Kingdom: Animalia
- Phylum: Chordata
- Class: Mammalia
- Infraclass: Placentalia
- Order: Rodentia
- Family: Ctenomyidae
- Genus: Ctenomys
- Species: C. peruanus

Binomial name
- Ctenomys peruanus Sanborn & Pearson, 1947

Species of rodent

The Peruvian tuco-tuco (Ctenomys peruanus) is a species of rodent in the family Ctenomyidae. It is endemic to Peru and Bolivia. This species is classified as critically endangered by the IUCN, due to a very small extant population (< 50 mature individuals as of 2026) and habitat destruction from livestock overgrazing. It is also hunted as both an agricultural pest and for use in traditional medicine.
