= Santiago de Méndez Canton =

- Canton
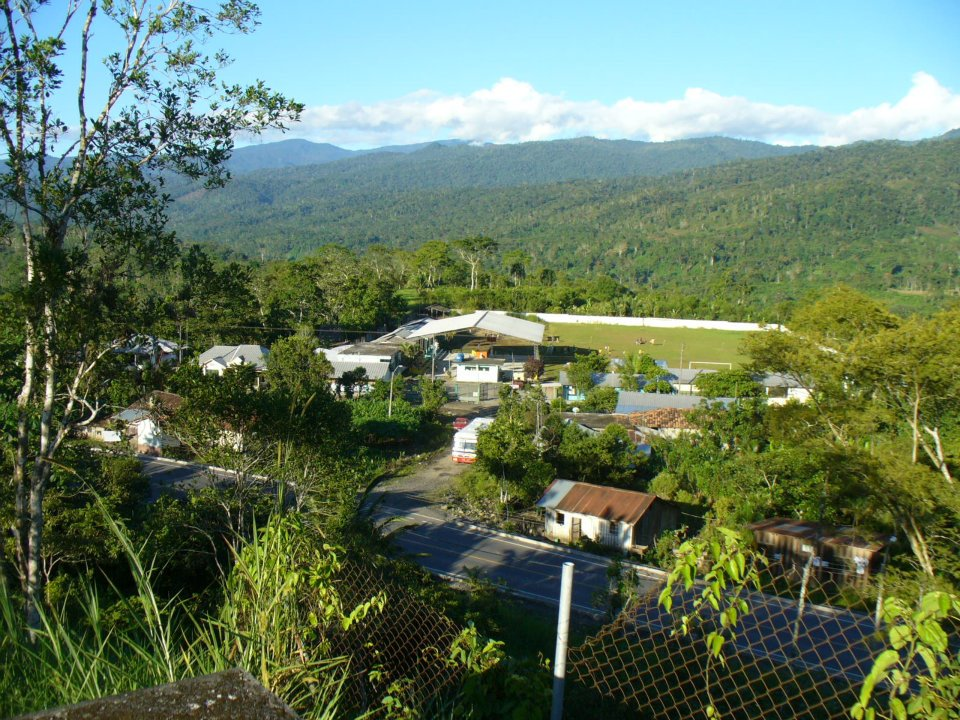
- Tayuza, Santiago de Méndez Canton

- Location of Morona-Santiago Province in Ecuador.

- Santiago de Méndez Canton in Morona Santiago Province
- Coordinates: 3.4298°S 78.5656°W
- Country: Ecuador
- Province: Morona-Santiago Province
- Time zone: UTC-5 (ECT)

Santiago de Méndez Canton is a canton of Ecuador, located in the Morona-Santiago Province. Its capital is the town of Santiago. Its population at the 2001 census was 9,841.
