= Long-footed rat =

Conservation status
- Least Concern (IUCN 3.1)

Scientific classification
- Kingdom: Animalia
- Phylum: Chordata
- Class: Mammalia
- Order: Rodentia
- Family: Muridae
- Genus: Tarsomys
- Species: T. apoensis

Binomial name
- Tarsomys apoensis Mearns, 1905
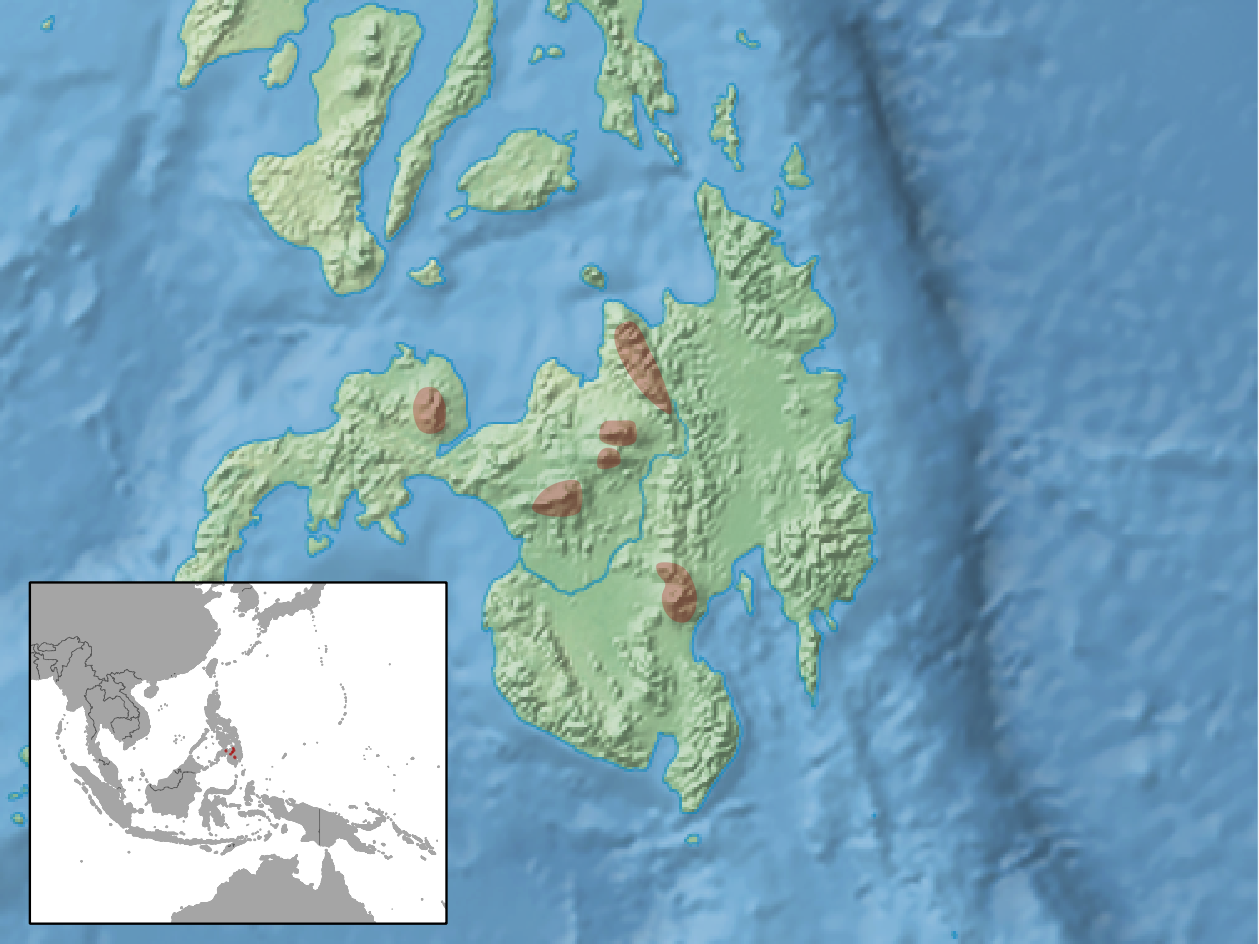

Species of rodent

The long-footed rat (Tarsomys apoensis) is a species of rodent in the family Muridae.

It is found only in the highlands of Mindanao, Philippines, including Mount Apo, Mount Kitanglad, and Mount Malindang.
