= Jaltenango de la Paz =

Town in the Mexican state of Chiapas

- Municipal seat
- Location in Mexico
- Coordinates: 15°52′21″N 92°43′30″W
- Country: Mexico
- State: Chiapas
- Municipality: Ángel Albino Corzo
- Elevation: 635 m (2,083 ft)

Population (2010)
  - Total: 10,427

Jaltenango de la Paz is a town and seat of the municipality of Ángel Albino Corzo, in the state of Chiapas, southern Mexico.
