= Villa San José de Vinchina =

Coordinates: 28°45′29″S 68°12′26″W

- Municipality and village
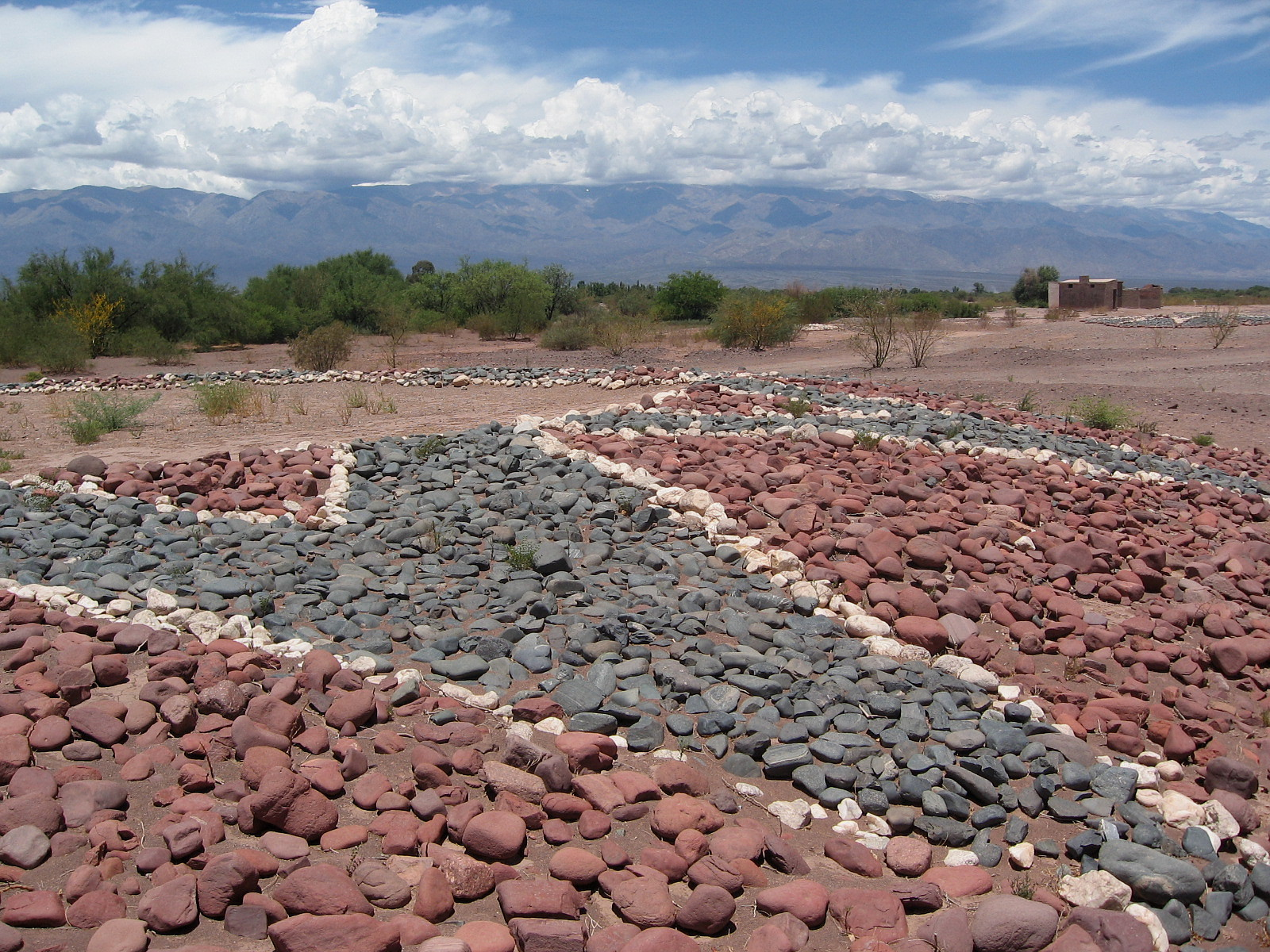
- Villa San José de Vinchina
- Interactive map of Villa San José de Vinchina
- Country: Argentina
- Province: La Rioja Province
- Department: Vinchina
- Elevation: 4,760 ft (1,450 m)

Population (2010)
  - Total: 2,401
- Time zone: UTC−3 (ART)
- Climate: BWk

Villa San José de Vinchina is a municipality and village in La Rioja Province in northwestern Argentina. It is the principal village of the Vinchina Department.
