= Feiler's rat =

- Stuffed specimen

Scientific classification
- Kingdom: Animalia
- Phylum: Chordata
- Class: Mammalia
- Order: Rodentia
- Family: Muridae
- Genus: Rattus
- Species: R. feileri

Binomial name
- Rattus feileri P.-H. Fabre, Miguez, Holden, Fitriana, Semiadi, Musser, & K. M. Helgen, 2023

Species of rodent

Feiler's rat (Rattus feileri) is a newly described species of rat from Indonesia. The species is known only from a holotype collected in 1938 on Taliabu Island, and stored in the State Museum of Zoology in Dresden. It is named after German zoologist Alfred Feiler.

== See also ==
- List of living mammal species described in the 2020s
