= Roig's tuco-tuco =

Conservation status
- Critically Endangered (IUCN 3.1)

Scientific classification
- Kingdom: Animalia
- Phylum: Chordata
- Class: Mammalia
- Order: Rodentia
- Family: Ctenomyidae
- Genus: Ctenomys
- Species: C. roigi

Binomial name
- Ctenomys roigi Contreras, 1988

Species of rodent

Roig's tuco-tuco (Ctenomys roigi) is a species of rodent in the family Ctenomyidae. It is endemic to a small region near the Paraná River in Corrientes Province, northeastern Argentina, where lives on sand dunes, and near rivers. Development is degrading and shrinking this habitat, threatening the rodent's survival. The species is named after Argentine zoologist Virgilio G. Roig. Its karyotype has 2n = 48 and FN = 80.
