= Dinagat gymnure =

Conservation status
- Endangered (IUCN 3.1)

Scientific classification
- Kingdom: Animalia
- Phylum: Chordata
- Class: Mammalia
- Order: Eulipotyphla
- Family: Erinaceidae
- Genus: Podogymnura
- Species: P. aureospinula

Binomial name
- Podogymnura aureospinula Heaney & Morgan, 1982
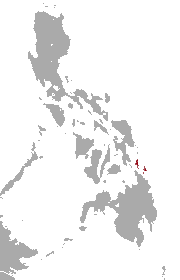
- Dinagat Gymnure range

Species of mammal

The Dinagat gymnure (Podogymnura aureospinula) is a species of mammal in the family Erinaceidae. It is endemic to the Philippines.

== Taxonomy ==
Podogymnura aureospinula was first described in 1982 by Lawrence R. Heany and Gary S. Morgan, based on specimens collected on Dinagat in the previous decade. The type specimen was collected at Plaridel in Albor Municipality. The species name aureospinula means "golden spine", referring to the spine-like fur on the Dinagat gymnure's back. Genetic analysis suggests it is most closely related to P. intermedia.

== Description ==
Compared to other members of the genus, the Dinagat gymnure is relatively large and robust, with the golden spine-like hairs for which it is named. The head and body length of the holotype is 211 millimetres (8.3 in), with a 73 millimetres (2.9 in) tail.

== Habitat and conservation status ==
Endemic to the Philippines, the Dinagat gymnure has been found on the islands of Dinagat, Bucas Grande, and Siargao. Its natural habitat is subtropical or tropical dry forests. While it has been found in several different types of forest, including second-growth forest and in fragmented forest near farmland, it is not found completely separate from forest habitats.

Due to its relatively limited range and the threat of significant habitat loss across that range, especially deforestation due to logging and mining, it is considered Endangered by the IUCN. The mammal is an evolutionary distinct and globally endangered species in the Philippines as identified by the Zoological Society of London in their EDGE species program, where it ranked 68th out of the thousands of mammal species known to humanity.
