= Cuautepec (municipality) =

Municipality in the Mexican state of Guerrero

- Municipality
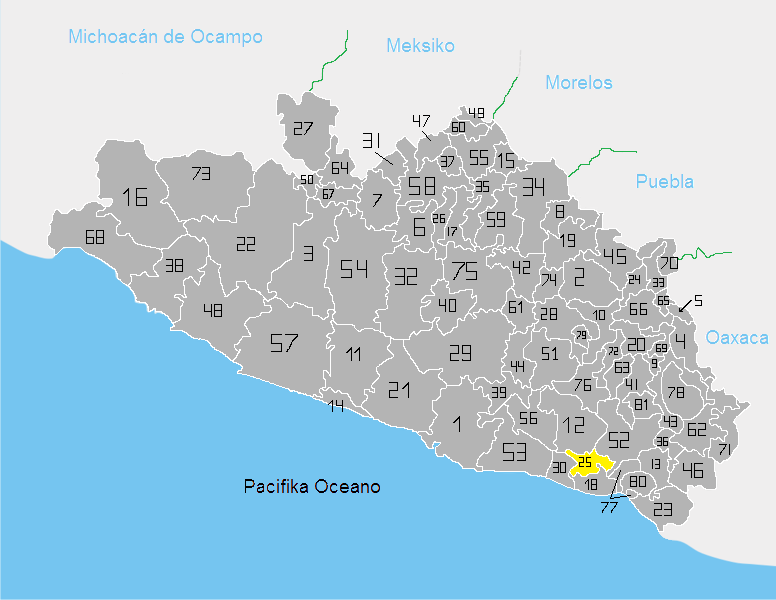

- Location in Mexico
- Coordinates: 16°41′N 98°50′W
- Country: Mexico
- State: Guerrero
- Municipal seat: Cuautepec

Area
  - Total: 414.3 km^{2} (160.0 sq mi)

Population (2020)
  - Total: 17,024
- Time zone: UTC-6 (Central)

Cuautepec is a municipality in the Mexican state of Guerrero. The municipal seat lies at Cuautepec. The municipality covers an area of 414.3 km^{2}.

In 2020, the municipality had a total population of 17,024, up from 14,554 in 2005.
