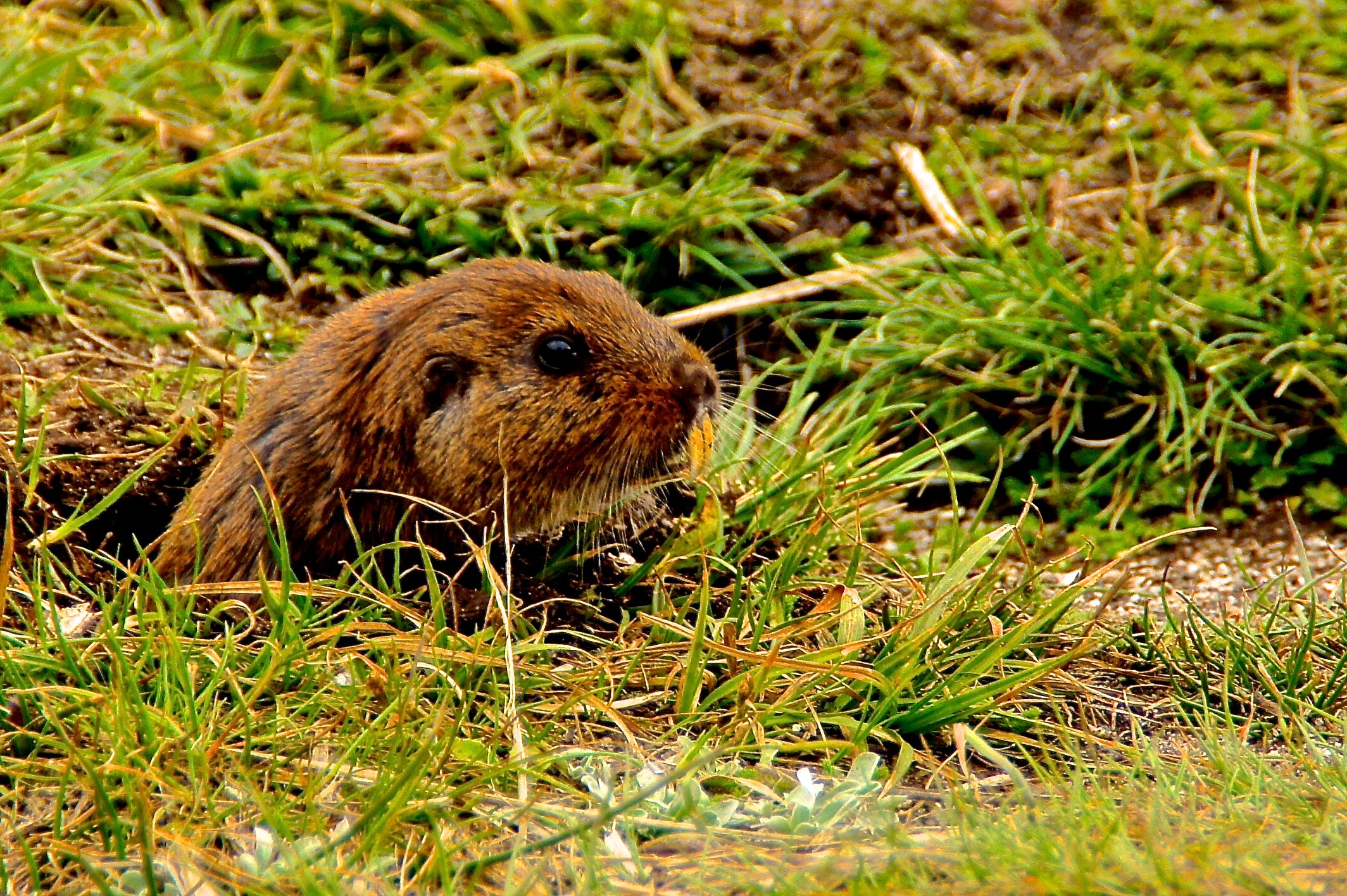

Conservation status
- Critically Endangered (IUCN 3.1)

Scientific classification
- Kingdom: Animalia
- Phylum: Chordata
- Class: Mammalia
- Order: Rodentia
- Family: Ctenomyidae
- Genus: Ctenomys
- Species: C. osvaldoreigi

Binomial name
- Ctenomys osvaldoreigi Contreras, 1995

= Reig's tuco-tuco =

Species of rodent

Reig's tuco-tuco (Ctenomys osvaldoreigi) is a species of rodent in the family Ctenomyidae. It is endemic to central Argentina, where it is known only from a grassland location in Cordoba Province at an elevation above 2000 m in the Sierras Grandes. The species is threatened by disruption of its habitat by fire and sheep grazing. It is named after Argentine biologist Osvaldo Reig (1929–1992).
