= Vernaya meiguites =

Scientific classification
- Kingdom: Animalia
- Phylum: Chordata
- Class: Mammalia
- Order: Rodentia
- Family: Muridae
- Genus: Vernaya
- Species: V. meiguites

Binomial name
- Vernaya meiguites Zhao, S. Liu, Jian, Y. Liu, & Chen, 2023

Species of rodent

Vernaya meiguites, also known as the Meigu climbing mouse, is a newly described species of rodent in the Muridae family that is native to China.

== See also ==
- List of living mammal species described in the 2020s
