= Vinchina Department =

Vinchina Departamento Vinchina
- Department
- Interactive map of Vinchina
- Country: Argentina
- Seat: Villa San José de Vinchina

Area
  - Total: 10,334 km^{2} (3,990 sq mi)

Population (2022)
  - Total: 2,699
  - Density: 0.2612/km^{2} (0.6764/sq mi)

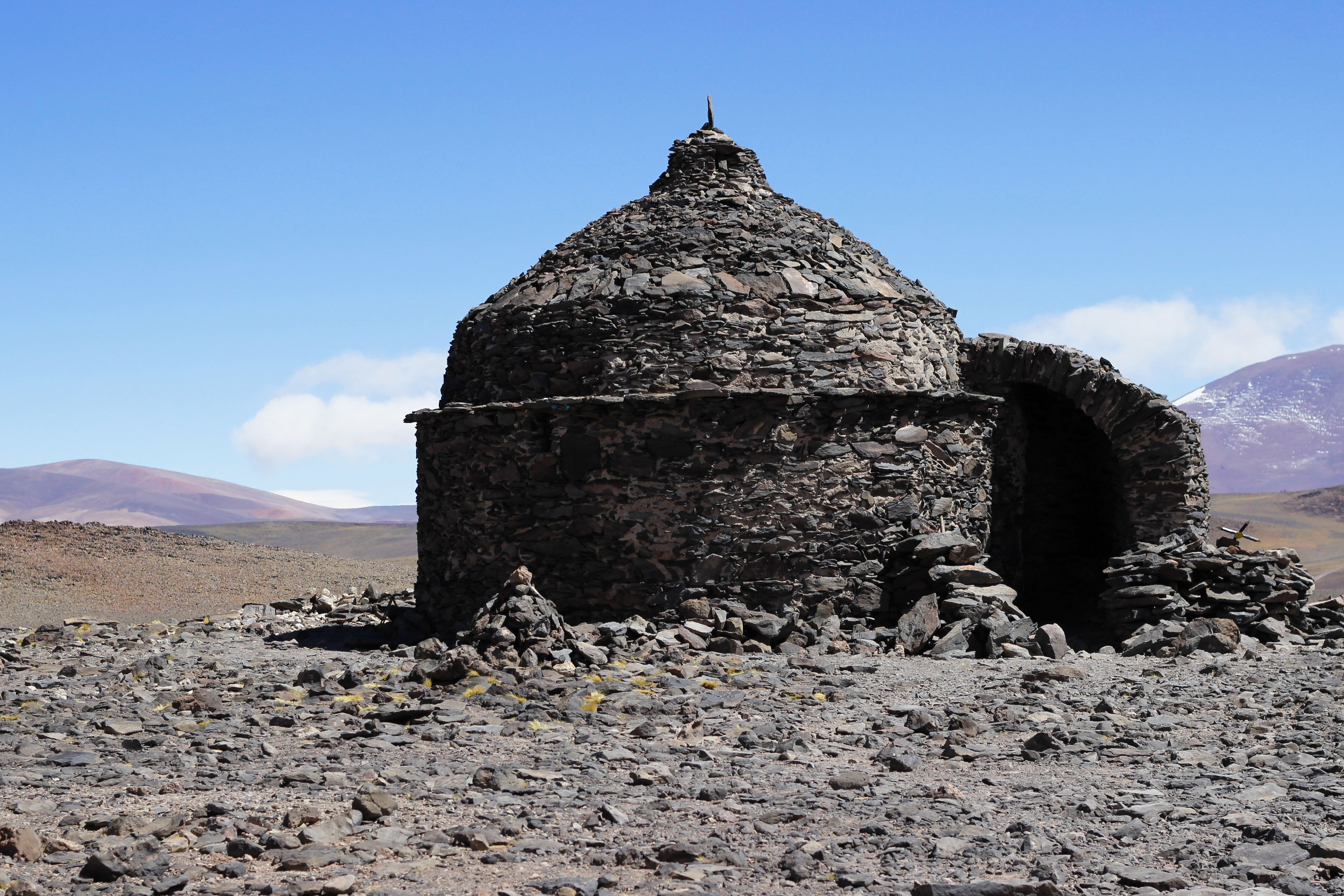
Laguna Brava Reserve, La Rioja, Argentina

Vinchina is a department of the province of La Rioja (Argentina).

== Settlements ==
- Bajo Jagüé
- Jagüé
- La Banda
- Villa San José de Vinchina
