= Mendoza tuco-tuco =

Conservation status
- Least Concern (IUCN 3.1)

Scientific classification
- Kingdom: Animalia
- Phylum: Chordata
- Class: Mammalia
- Order: Rodentia
- Family: Ctenomyidae
- Genus: Ctenomys
- Species: C. mendocinus

Binomial name
- Ctenomys mendocinus Philippi, 1869

Synonyms
- Ctenomys azarae Thomas, 1903; Ctenomys porteousi Thomas, 1916

Species of rodent

The Mendoza tuco-tuco (Ctenomys mendocinus) is a species of rodent in the family Ctenomyidae.

== Taxonomy ==
A 2021 phylogenetic study found that Azara's tuco-tuco (C. azarae) and Porteous's tuco-tuco (C. porteousi), which were both previously considered distinct species in Ctenomys, are synonymous with C. mendocinus. The American Society of Mammalogists has followed this study's results. The former species was named after Spanish naturalist Félix de Azara, while the latter species was named after Lieutenant Colonel John James Porteous (1857–1948) and his nephew Don Cecil John Montague Porteous (1884– 1953), who owned land in Argentina.

== Description ==
Ctenomys mendocinus ranges from 230 to 280 mm (9.1 to 11.0 in) in body length, and tail length of 70–91 mm (2.8–3.6 in). Body mass ranges anywhere between 100 and 250 g (3.5 and 8.8 oz), with males typically larger than females. They have a stocky, robust body shape with short limbs and ears. Pelage is predominantly light-brown with subtle black and white coloration on its dorsal side, and a lightly colored tail. Forelimbs have long claws, necessary for burrowing.

== Distribution ==
The species is endemic to the northern and central regions of the Mendoza province in Argentina, at a range of elevation from 460 to 3,600 m (1,510 to 11,810 ft).

== Behavior ==
Members of this species engage in solitary burrowing behavior. Their foreleg claws are their primary method of digging tunnels through the ground, although the incisors may be used occasionally. They generally do not arise above the surface during the day time; however, they have a preference for above ground plant material and will surface to forage for food.

Newborns are highly altricial: after a 3-month gestation period, pups are born half-naked and blind, weaning 56 days after birth and becoming independent after 80 days.

== Diet ==
The Mendoza tuco-tuco is an herbivore that feeds preferentially on grasses. Populations in the Andean Precordilla region of Mendoza display high selectivity for grasses and avoidance of shrubs with a preference for above ground plant material, despite a fossorial lifestyle and harsh environmental conditions that lower food availability.
