= Pichi Mahuida Department =

Pichi Mahuida Departamento Pichi Mahuida
- Department
- Location of Pichi Mahuida
- Coordinates: 39°01′00″S 64°05′00″W
- Country: Argentina
- Province: Río Negro Province
- Seat: Río Colorado

Area
  - Total: 15,378 km^{2} (5,937 sq mi)

Population (2022)
  - Total: 16,551
  - Density: 1.0763/km^{2} (2.7875/sq mi)

Pichi Mahuida is a department of the province of Río Negro (Argentina).
