= Spiny long-footed rat =

Conservation status
- Vulnerable (IUCN 3.1)

Scientific classification
- Kingdom: Animalia
- Phylum: Chordata
- Class: Mammalia
- Order: Rodentia
- Family: Muridae
- Genus: Tarsomys
- Species: T. echinatus

Binomial name
- Tarsomys echinatus Musser & Heaney, 1992
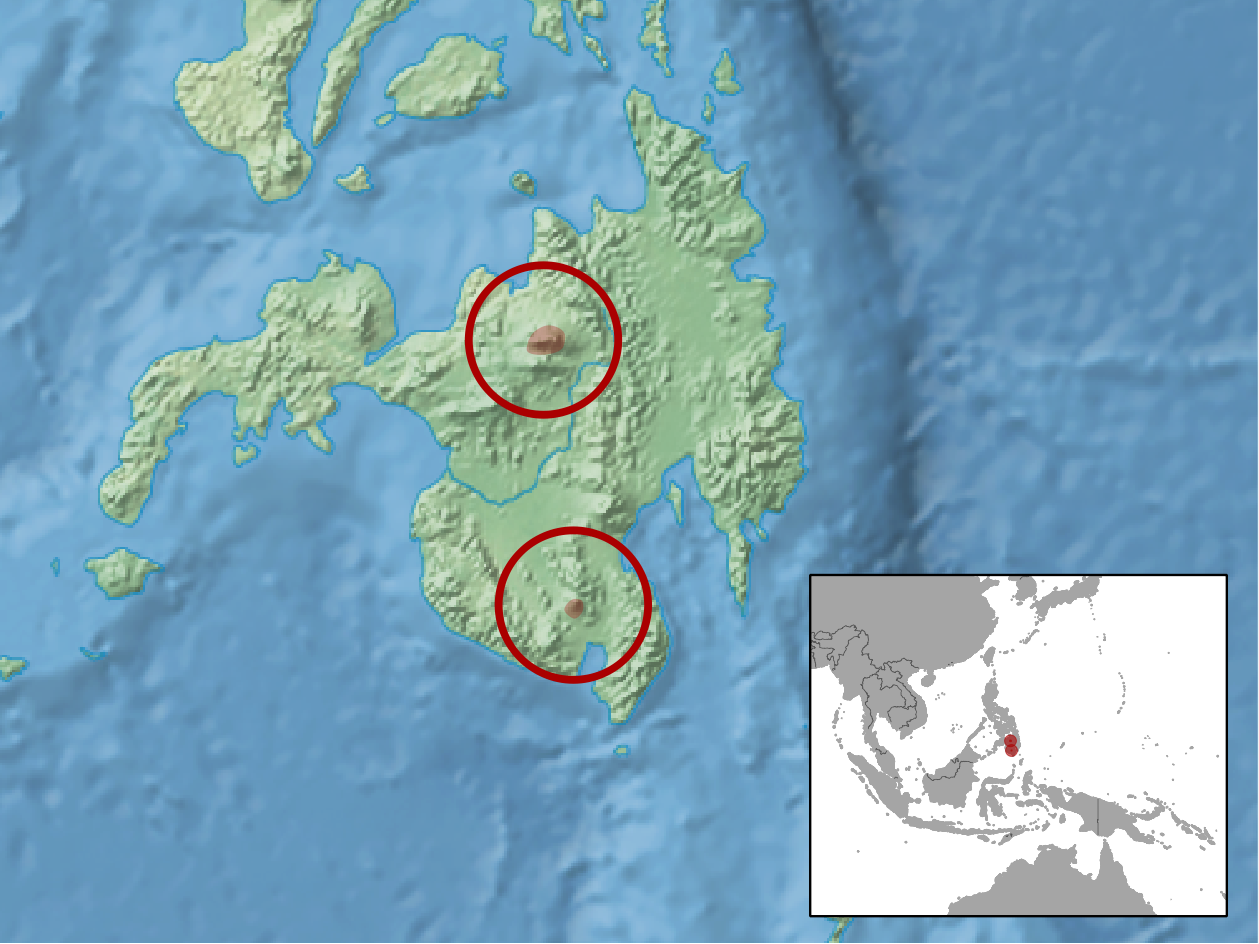

Species of rodent

The spiny long-footed rat (Tarsomys echinatus), also known as the Mindanao spiny rat, is a species of rodent in the family Muridae.

It is found only in Mindanao, Philippines, in Bukidnon and South Cotabato provinces. It has been recorded in lowland areas around Mount Kitanglad and Mount Matutum.
