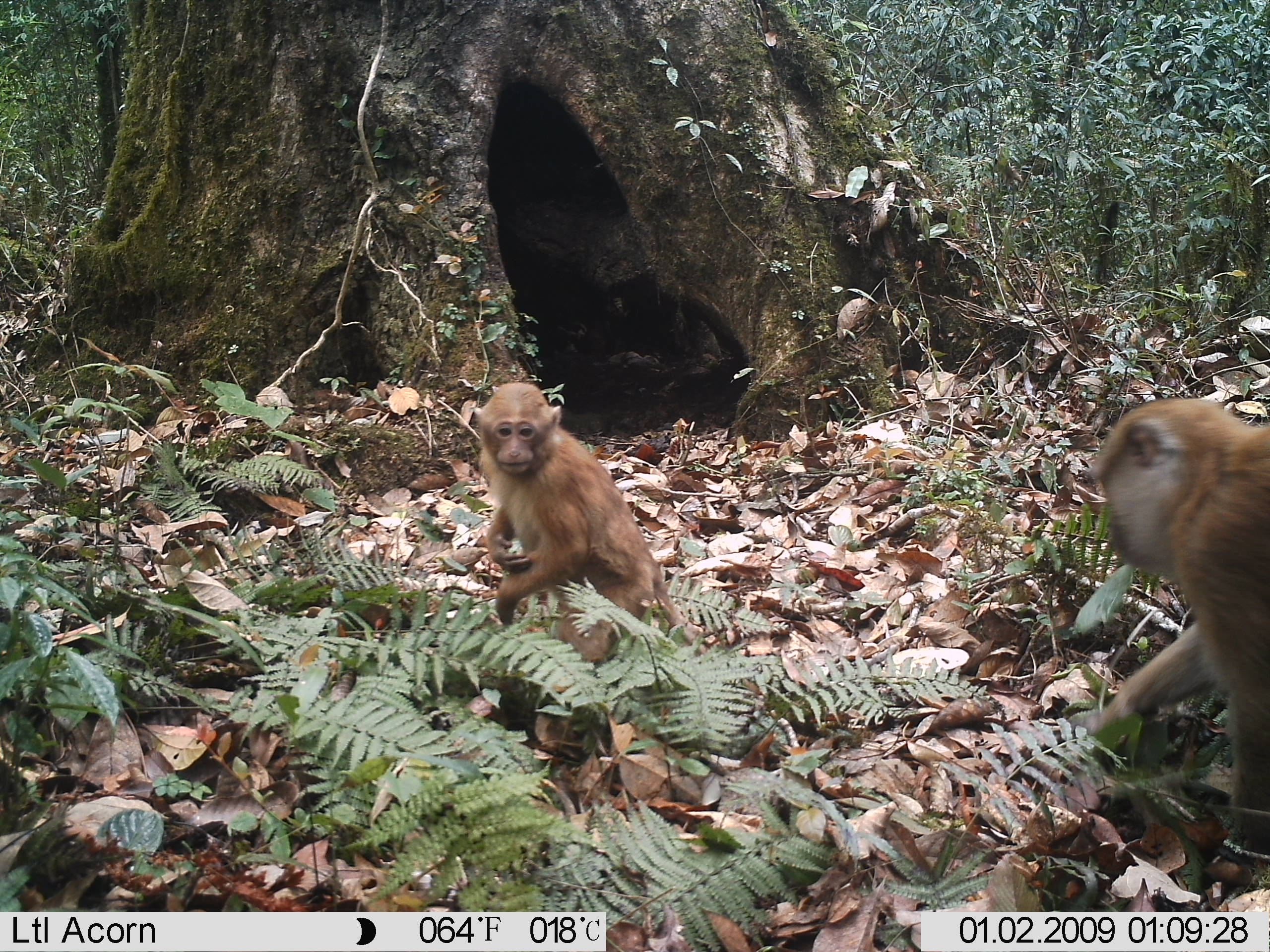

Conservation status
- Data Deficient (IUCN 3.1)

Scientific classification
- Kingdom: Animalia
- Phylum: Chordata
- Class: Mammalia
- Order: Primates
- Family: Cercopithecidae
- Genus: Macaca
- Species: M. selai

Binomial name
- Macaca selai Thakur, Singh, Datta, Sharma, Chandra and Banerjee, 2022
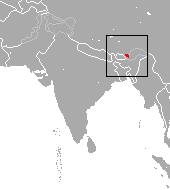
- Sela macaque range

= Sela macaque =

Species of primate

Macaca selai commonly known as the Sela macaque, is a recently discovered cercopithecine primate species of macaque endemic to Arunachal Pradesh in northeastern India. It was formally described in 2022, based on molecular and morphological evidence and is recognised as distinct from the Arunachal macaque (Macaca munzala).

The Sela macaque is one of the endangered species as other macaque species of Arunachal Pradesh are, but the IUCN Red list is not evaluated yet for them.

== Taxonomy ==
Macaca selai was formally described as distinct species in 2022 by Gosh et al. following molecular polygenetic and morphological analysis of macaque populations in Arunachal Pradesh. Before it's description, the eastern population was generally considered part of Arunachal macaque(Macaca munzala). Genetic evidence shows that Sela Pass acted as long term genetic barrier, preventing gene flow between eastern and western populations. As a result, the two populations diverged through allopatric speciation, leading authors to recognise M. serai as a different species.

== Discovery ==
Mecaca selai was formally described in 2022 by Avjit Gosh, Mukesh Thakur, Sujeet K. Singh, Ritam Dutta, Lalit K. Sharma, Kailash Chandra, Dhriti Banerjee. The species was identified through molecular polygenic analyses of macaque populations from Arunachal Pradesh, which revealed substantial genetic divergence from the closely related Arunachal macaque. The new species was named selai after the Sela pass which separates its range from that of M. munzala.

Macaca selai interestingly exhibits high intra-specific genetic variation and also harbors at least two conservative units,Our results suggested that the Arunachal macaque evolved in two polygenic species about 1.96 million years ago. Following allopatric speciation by means of sela mountain pass in Arunachal Pradesh, India. The study also identifies gap areas for undertaking survey to document the relic and unknown trans-boundary populations of macaques through multinational, multilateral cross border collaborations

— Dr. Mukesh Thakur and colleagues, Zoological Survey of India,

== Description ==
Macaca selai is a medium sized macaque belonging to the scinia specific group. It is generally more closely related to Arunachal macaque (Macaca munzala), Despite sharing several characteristics, including the robust body built and relatively long dorsal hair, M. selai can be distinguished by its paler face and lighter brown coat, whereas M. munzala typically has a darker face and dark brown fur. These stocky monkeys have dense brownish-yellow fur prominent ears pink face and deep set light brown eyes. Some reports suggest that these macaques are larger than the Arunachal macaques with body length measures between 28-32 inches (71-82 cm). Males are slightly larger than females with larger canines and clearly visible male reproductive organs, making it easy to distinguish sexes apart. However, their lifespan is unknown, but it is assumed that it is similar to other macaques of comparable size, which is 30 years.

== Threats ==
Recent reports suggest that there are at least 3 troops of 29 Sela macaques. Local farmers usually see them as pests and may try to catch or kill them. This retaliatory hunting has become the main threat among macaques, with limited available habitat, and presents challenges for long-term population growth. Also, some researchers are concerned that Sela macaques that are living near human proximity and consuming more crops may become exposed to diseases carried by humans for which their immune system is not equipped.
