= Huangang shrew mole =

Scientific classification
- Kingdom: Animalia
- Phylum: Chordata
- Class: Mammalia
- Order: Eulipotyphla
- Family: Talpidae
- Genus: Uropsilus
- Species: U. huanggangensis

Binomial name
- Uropsilus huanggangensis Chen, Jiang, & Ren, 2023

Species of mammal

The Huangang shrew mole (Uropsilus huanggangensis) is a shrew-like mole native to China.

== See also ==
- List of living mammal species described in the 2020s
