= Río Colorado, Río Negro =

Aguante el verde
- Municipality and village
- Río Colorado
- Location within Argentina
- Coordinates: 38°59′39.7″S 64°05′42.4″W
- Country: Argentina
- Province: Río Negro
- Department: Pichi Mahuida
- Established: 29 March 1901

Government
  - Intendant: Carlos Pilotti (PJ-FPV)

Population (2010)
  - Total: 13,828
- Time zone: UTC−3 (ART)
- Climate: BSk

Río Colorado is a town and municipality in the Río Negro Province of Argentina. It is the administrative centre of the Pichi Mahuida Department.

== Population ==
According to the 2010 census [INDEC], the municipality 13,828 inhabitants, an increase of 0.12% compared to the 2001 census [INDEC] which recorded a population of 12,900.

== Geography ==
=== Climate ===
Río Colorado has a semi-arid climate (Köppen climate classification BSk). Winters are cool with a July mean of 7.4 °C (45.3 °F), with temperatures that frequently drop below 0 °C (32.0 °F) and occasionally below −10 °C (14.0 °F). Cloudy days are common during winter, averaging 7–8 days from June to August. Spring and fall are transition seasons that feature average maximum temperatures of 18 to 28 °C (64.4 to 82.4 °F) and an average minimum of 4 to 12 °C (39.2 to 53.6 °F) although temperatures can reach as high as 40.2 °C (104.4 °F) and low as −8.5 °C (16.7 °F) during these seasons. Summers are hot, dry, and sunny with an average maximum of 30 to 32 °C (86.0 to 89.6 °F) and an average minimum of 14 to 15 °C (57.2 to 59.0 °F). Precipitation is low, averaging 423.9 millimetres (17 in) which is fairly evenly distributed throughout the year. Rio Colorado averages about 2,683.8 hours of bright sunshine per year (approximately 7.4 hours of sunshine per day) or about 58.7% of possible sunshine ranging from a high of 71.5% in February to a low of only 38.0% in June. The highest temperature recorded was 43.4 °C (110.1 °F) while the lowest temperature recorded was −12.3 °C (9.9 °F).

Climate data for Río Colorado, Río Negro (1941–1990, extremes 1941–present) (Note: The record highs and lows are based on the Secretaria de Mineria link for the period 1941–1990 while records beyond 1990 come from the Oficina de Riesgo Agropecuario link since it only covers from 1970–present)
Month	Jan	Feb	Mar	Apr	May	Jun	Jul	Aug	Sep	Oct	Nov	Dec	Year
Record high °C (°F)	43.4 (110.1)	42.6 (108.7)	38.8 (101.8)	37.3 (99.1)	28.8 (83.8)	25.5 (77.9)	27.0 (80.6)	29.0 (84.2)	33.1 (91.6)	38.0 (100.4)	40.2 (104.4)	42.3 (108.1)	43.4 (110.1)
Mean daily maximum °C (°F)	32.1 (89.8)	30.8 (87.4)	27.0 (80.6)	22.5 (72.5)	17.6 (63.7)	13.9 (57.0)	13.9 (57.0)	16.7 (62.1)	19.3 (66.7)	23.4 (74.1)	27.5 (81.5)	30.1 (86.2)	22.9 (73.2)
Daily mean °C (°F)	23.8 (74.8)	22.4 (72.3)	19.0 (66.2)	14.7 (58.5)	11.0 (51.8)	7.7 (45.9)	7.4 (45.3)	9.3 (48.7)	12.0 (53.6)	15.8 (60.4)	19.9 (67.8)	22.4 (72.3)	15.5 (59.9)
Mean daily minimum °C (°F)	15.3 (59.5)	14.5 (58.1)	11.9 (53.4)	8.2 (46.8)	5.1 (41.2)	2.3 (36.1)	1.9 (35.4)	2.8 (37.0)	5.0 (41.0)	8.3 (46.9)	11.7 (53.1)	14.2 (57.6)	8.4 (47.1)
Record low °C (°F)	0.2 (32.4)	1.4 (34.5)	−2.9 (26.8)	−5.4 (22.3)	−8.5 (16.7)	−12.3 (9.9)	−11.8 (10.8)	−9.6 (14.7)	−8.6 (16.5)	−3.6 (25.5)	−2.2 (28.0)	−0.3 (31.5)	−12.3 (9.9)
Average precipitation mm (inches)	37.6 (1.48)	47.3 (1.86)	49.3 (1.94)	41.4 (1.63)	28.7 (1.13)	20.4 (0.80)	20.2 (0.80)	15.5 (0.61)	30.9 (1.22)	46.8 (1.84)	42.5 (1.67)	42.8 (1.69)	423.4 (16.67)
Average precipitation days (≥ 0.1 mm)	5	5	6	5	5	5	6	4	5	6	6	6	64
Average relative humidity (%)	48.0	52.0	61.6	67.0	60.4	74.0	73.2	63.4	59.4	56.2	50.8	48.4	59.5
Mean monthly sunshine hours	319.3	279.7	263.5	201.0	151.9	108.0	136.4	179.8	195.0	241.8	285.0	322.4	2,683.8
Percentage possible sunshine	70.0	71.5	68.5	59.0	48.5	38.0	45.0	54.0	54.5	59.0	66.5	69.5	58.7
Source 1: Secretaria de Mineria, Oficina de Riesgo Agropecuario (August and October record highs only)
Source 2: Servicio Meteorológico Nacional (precipitation days),
