= Taliabu Island rat =

Scientific classification
- Kingdom: Animalia
- Phylum: Chordata
- Class: Mammalia
- Order: Rodentia
- Family: Muridae
- Genus: Rattus
- Species: R. taliabuensis

Binomial name
- Rattus taliabuensis P.-H. Fabre, Miguez, Holden, Fitriana, Semiadi, Musser, & K. M. Helgen, 2023

Species of mammal

The Taliabu Island rat (Rattus taliabuensis) is a newly described species of rat from Indonesia.

== See also ==
- List of living mammal species described in the 2020s
