= Ángel Albino Corzo =

Municipality in the Mexican state of Chiapas

- Municipality
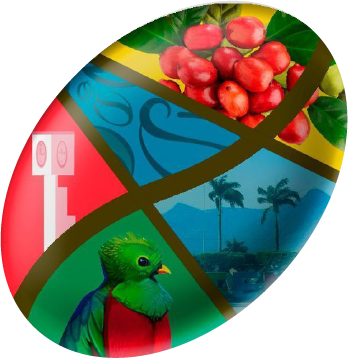
- Coat of arms

- Municipality of Ángel Albino Corzo in Chiapas

- Location in Mexico
- Coordinates: 16°32′N 92°26′W
- Country: Mexico
- State: Chiapas
- Municipal seat: Jaltenango de la Paz
- Municipality created: 24 February 1933

Area
  - Total: 1,748.81 km^{2} (675.22 sq mi)
- Elevation: 644 m (2,113 ft)

Population (2010)
  - Total: 26,628
  - Density: 15.226/km^{2} (39.436/sq mi)

Ángel Albino Corzo is a municipality in the Mexican state of Chiapas, in southern Mexico. It covers an area of 1748.81 km^{2}. Its municipal seat is the town of Jaltenango de la Paz.

As of 2010, the municipality had a total population of 26,628, up from 21,848 as of 2005.

The municipality had 199 localities, the largest of which (with 2010 populations in parentheses) were: Jaltenango de la Paz (10,427), Nueva Palestina (3,475), classified as urban, and Querétaro (2,203), Francisco I. Madero (1,819), Nueva Colombia (1,568), and Nueva Independencia (1,283), classified as rural.

The municipality was created on 24 February 1933 during the administration of Governor Victórico R. Grajales. It was named for 19th-century Chiapas politician Ángel Albino Corzo (after whom Chiapa de Corzo was also named).
