= Ctenomys terraplen =

Conservation status
- Vulnerable (IUCN 3.1)

Scientific classification
- Kingdom: Animalia
- Phylum: Chordata
- Class: Mammalia
- Order: Rodentia
- Family: Ctenomyidae
- Genus: Ctenomys
- Species: C. terraplen

Binomial name
- Ctenomys terraplen Brook, B. González, I.H. Tomasco, Verzi, & G.M. Martin, 2024

Species of mammal

Ctenomys terraplen, the Laguna Terraplén tuco-tuco, is a vulnerable species of tuco-tuco. It is endemic to Argentina.
