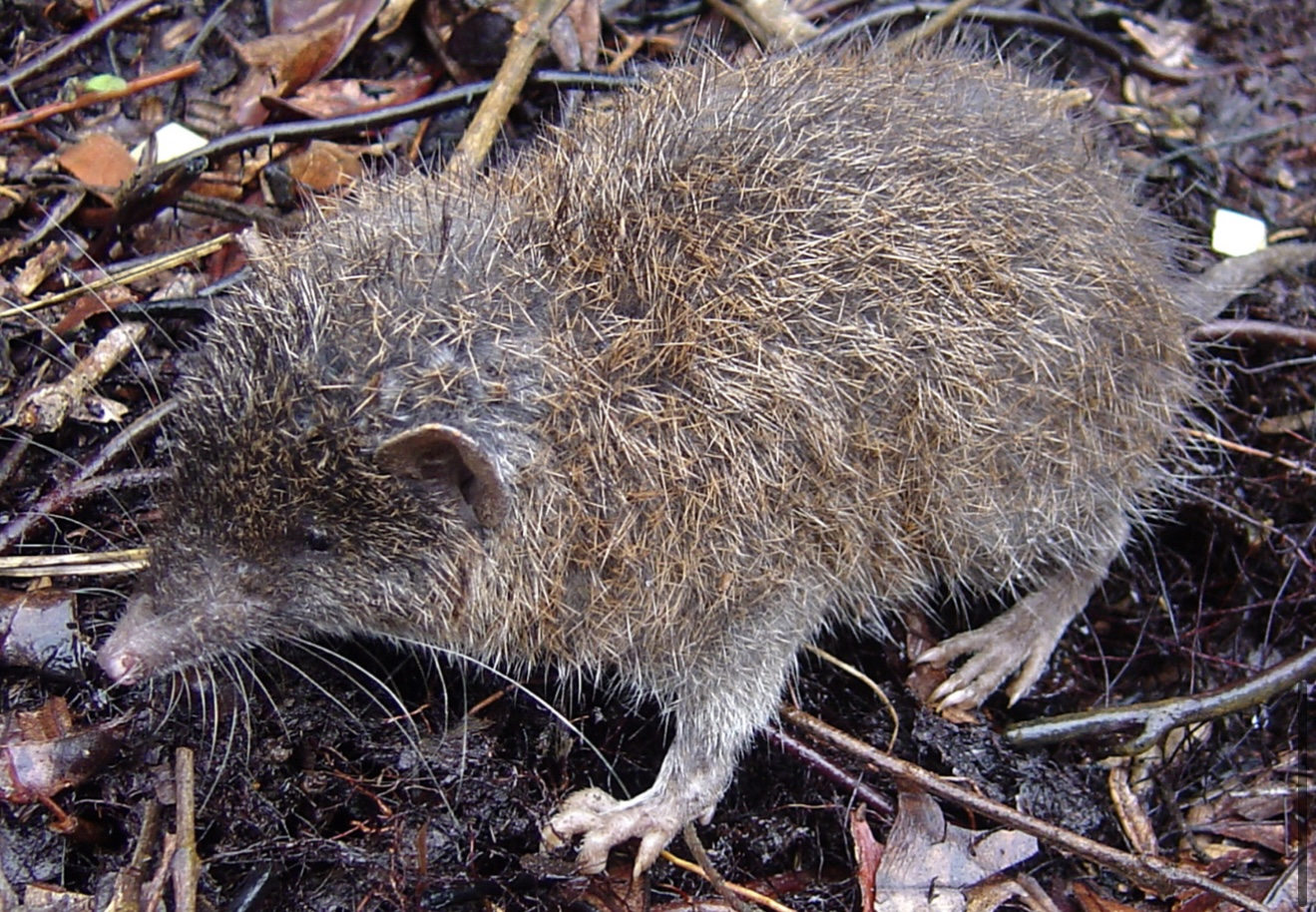

Scientific classification
- Kingdom: Animalia
- Phylum: Chordata
- Class: Mammalia
- Order: Eulipotyphla
- Family: Erinaceidae
- Genus: Podogymnura
- Species: P. intermedia

Binomial name
- Podogymnura intermedia Balete, Heaney, Rickart, Quidlat, Rowsey, & L. E. Olson, 2023

= Eastern Mindanao gymnure =

Species of mammal

The eastern Mindanao gymnure (Podogymnura intermedia) is a species of gymnure in the genus Podogymnura. It is known only from Mount Hamiguitan and Mount Kampalili, two mountains in the eastern part of the island of Mindanao in the Philippines. It was first named in 2023 by a team of researchers led by Danilo Balete.

It is intermediate in size between the larger Dinagat gymnure (Podogymnura aureospinula) and the smaller Mindanao gymnure (P. truei) and P. minima, whence the name intermedia. There are some differences between the populations from Mt. Hamiguitan and Mt. Kampalili; for instance, the Kampalili gymnures have softer fur.

== See also ==
- List of living mammal species described in the 2020s
