= Puntilla tuco-tuco =

Conservation status
- Data Deficient (IUCN 3.1)

Scientific classification
- Kingdom: Animalia
- Phylum: Chordata
- Class: Mammalia
- Order: Rodentia
- Family: Ctenomyidae
- Genus: Ctenomys
- Species: C. coludo

Binomial name
- Ctenomys coludo Thomas, 1920

Species of rodent

The Puntilla tuco-tuco (Ctenomys coludo) is a species of rodent in the family Ctenomyidae. It is endemic to central Argentina. The common name of the species comes from the municipality of La Puntilla at the type locality. It was first described by the British zoologist Oldfield Thomas in 1920 after being collected by Emilio Budin, an Argentine specimen collector who worked with Oldfield Thomas.

== Taxonomy ==
This species is treated by some authorities as synonymous with the tawny tuco-tuco (Ctenomys fulvus), a species found in Chile, and further investigation needs to be done before its affinities can be resolved.

== Description ==
The Puntilla tuco-tuco is a fairly large species of tuco-tuco. The type specimen has a head-and-body length of 205 mm (8.1 in) and a tail length of 97 mm (3.8 in). It is an even pale colour and is distinguished from other tuco-tucos living in the same area by the long tail, the narrow skull and the broad auditory bullae (hollow bony structures on the skull that enclose parts of the middle and inner ear). The Catamarca tuco-tuco (Ctenomys knighti) is a darker colour and Foch's tuco-tuco (Ctenomys fochi) is smaller.

== Status ==
This species is known only from the location in La Puntilla in the Catamarca Province of Argentina from which it was first collected, at an elevation of about 1,000 m (3,300 ft) above sea level. Not enough is known about the species, its population size and trend, to enable the International Union for Conservation of Nature to assess its conservation status, so it has been rated as "data deficient".
