= Plebiscite tuco-tuco =

Conservation status
- Endangered (IUCN 3.1)

Scientific classification
- Kingdom: Animalia
- Phylum: Chordata
- Class: Mammalia
- Order: Rodentia
- Family: Ctenomyidae
- Genus: Ctenomys
- Species: C. plebiscitum

Binomial name
- Ctenomys plebiscitum Brook, Tomasco, González & Martin, 2021

Species of rodent

The plebiscite tuco-tuco (Ctenomys plebiscitum) is a fossorial rodent species in the tuco-tuco family, Ctenomyidae. It is native to the area around Esquel city, in the northwestern part of Chubut, Argentina, and is listed as Endangered on the IUCN Red List.

== Taxonomy ==
The plebiscite tuco-tuco was first described in 2021 by zoologists Federico Brook, Ivanna H. Tomasco, Baltazar González, and Gabriel M. Martin, based on phylogenetic analyses of DNA sequences and assessment of its morphology. The holotype, an adult female, was collected on 2 October 2019 by Brook and W. Mauricio Dromaz at the Reserva Natural Urbana Laguna La Zeta, a nature reserve near Esquel, at an elevation of about 800 m (2,600 ft). It is held at the Laboratorio de Investigaciones en Evolución y Biodiversidad in Esquel.

=== Etymology ===
The name "plebiscitum" honours the plebiscite of 23 March 2003, a mining referendum in which the residents of Esquel voted against large-scale mining projects near the city.

== Description ==
The plebiscite tuco-tuco is a medium-sized rodent weighing 200–300 g (7.1–10.6 oz). Its fur is dense, soft, and fluffy. The back is grey, and dark or light brown, with black-tipped hairs concentrated along the midline, and an underside in grey and yellow. A patch of light brown hair surrounds the whiskers, and individuals from some populations have a white patch on the head or back.

The holotype measured 250 mm (9.8 in) in body length, with a 77 mm (3.0 in) long tail, and weighed 140 g (4.9 oz).

== Distribution and habitat ==
The species is endemic to Futaleufú Department in northwestern Chubut, and was originally known only from a few localities near Esquel: Cerro 21, the old Esquel–Trevelin road, and Laguna La Zeta. Additional localities were reported in 2025. It prefers open shrubland with high grass coverage, and is rarely found on bare soil. It is usually associated with Patagonian wetlands known as mallines.

Its extent of occurrence is approx. 403 km^{2} (156 sq mi), but the species only occupies approx. 76 km^{2} (29 sq mi). The range is split between two populations: a southern one in the Nahuel Pan mountain range and valley, and a northern one in the Percy River valley and the Esquel mountain range. The city of Esquel separates the two, and this fragmentation may make the species more vulnerable.

== Behaviour ==
Like other tuco-tucos, the plebiscite tuco-tuco is subterranean, living in underground burrows. The species was initially believed to be solitary, like the majority of other Ctenomyidae. However, a 2026 study documented burrow and nest-site sharing in the species, making C. plebiscitum the second Patagonian tuco-tuco known to share burrows. The social tuco-tuco is another social species of the genus.

== Conservation ==
It is considered endangered because of its very small range, its occurrence at fewer than five locations, and the ongoing decline of its habitat. Most of its range is grazing land, where it competes with livestock for food. Near Esquel, new housing developments are encroaching on its habitat, and several recent wildfires have burned areas where it has been recorded. Attacks by domestic dogs have also been reported near the city. Ranchers and farmers in the region tend to view tuco-tucos as pests, but this species is not directly trapped or hunted.

Part of its range lies within the Reserva Natural Urbana Laguna La Zeta, a protected area managed by the municipality.
