= Ctenomys yatesi =

Yates' tuco-tuco

Scientific classification
- Kingdom: Animalia
- Phylum: Chordata
- Class: Mammalia
- Order: Rodentia
- Family: Ctenomyidae
- Genus: Ctenomys
- Species: C. yatesi

Binomial name
- Ctenomys yatesi Gardner, Salazar-Bravo, & Cook, 2014

Species of rodent

Ctenomys yatesi, also called Yates' tuco-tuco, is a species of tuco-tuco native to Bolivia. Only found near Roboré, Department of Santa Cruz, at an elevation of around 550 metres (1,800 ft), individuals of this species measure about 220 millimetres (8 3/4 in) in length and have soft hazel and grey hair. The species was named after Terry Yates, a former curator at the University of New Mexico.
