= Museum of Southwestern Biology =

Museum in New Mexico

Coordinates: 35.083°N 106.621°W

- Established: 1938
- Location: University of New Mexico
- Type: Science museum
- Collection size: 4,000,000+ specimens
- Visitors: by appointment or at annual open-collections event
- Director: Christopher Witt
- Curators: Lisa N. Barrow, PhD (Amphibians and Reptiles), Kelly B. Miller, PhD (Arthropods), Christopher C. Witt, PhD (Birds), Thomas F. Turner, PhD (Fishes), Michael Anderson, PhD (Genomic Resources), Hannah E. Marx, PhD (Herbarium), Joseph A. Cook, PhD (Mammals), Eric S. Loker, PhD (Parasites)
- Website: Museum of Southwestern Biology Home Page

Established	1938
Location	University of New Mexico
Type	Science museum
Collection size	4,000,000+ specimens
Visitors	by appointment or at annual open-collections event
Director	Christopher Witt
Curator	Lisa N. Barrow, PhD (Amphibians and Reptiles), Kelly B. Miller, PhD (Arthropods), Christopher C. Witt, PhD (Birds), Thomas F. Turner, PhD (Fishes), Michael Anderson, PhD (Genomic Resources), Hannah E. Marx, PhD (Herbarium), Joseph A. Cook, PhD (Mammals), Eric S. Loker, PhD (Parasites)

The Museum of Southwestern Biology (MSB) is a research and teaching facility in the Department of Biology of the University of New Mexico (UNM). The museum's collections include vascular plants, invertebrates and vertebrates from the American West, Central and South America, and from throughout the world. It is open to visitors by appointment.

The museum is thought to hold the largest collection of frozen tissue samples (500,000+) in the western hemisphere and has assisted in the study of emerging zoonotic pathogens such as the orthohantavirus and the Lassa mammarenavirus.

== Mammals ==
- Ctenomys erikacuellarae
- Monodelphis sanctaerosae
- Ctenomys lessai
- Tapecomys primus
- Thomasomys andersoni
