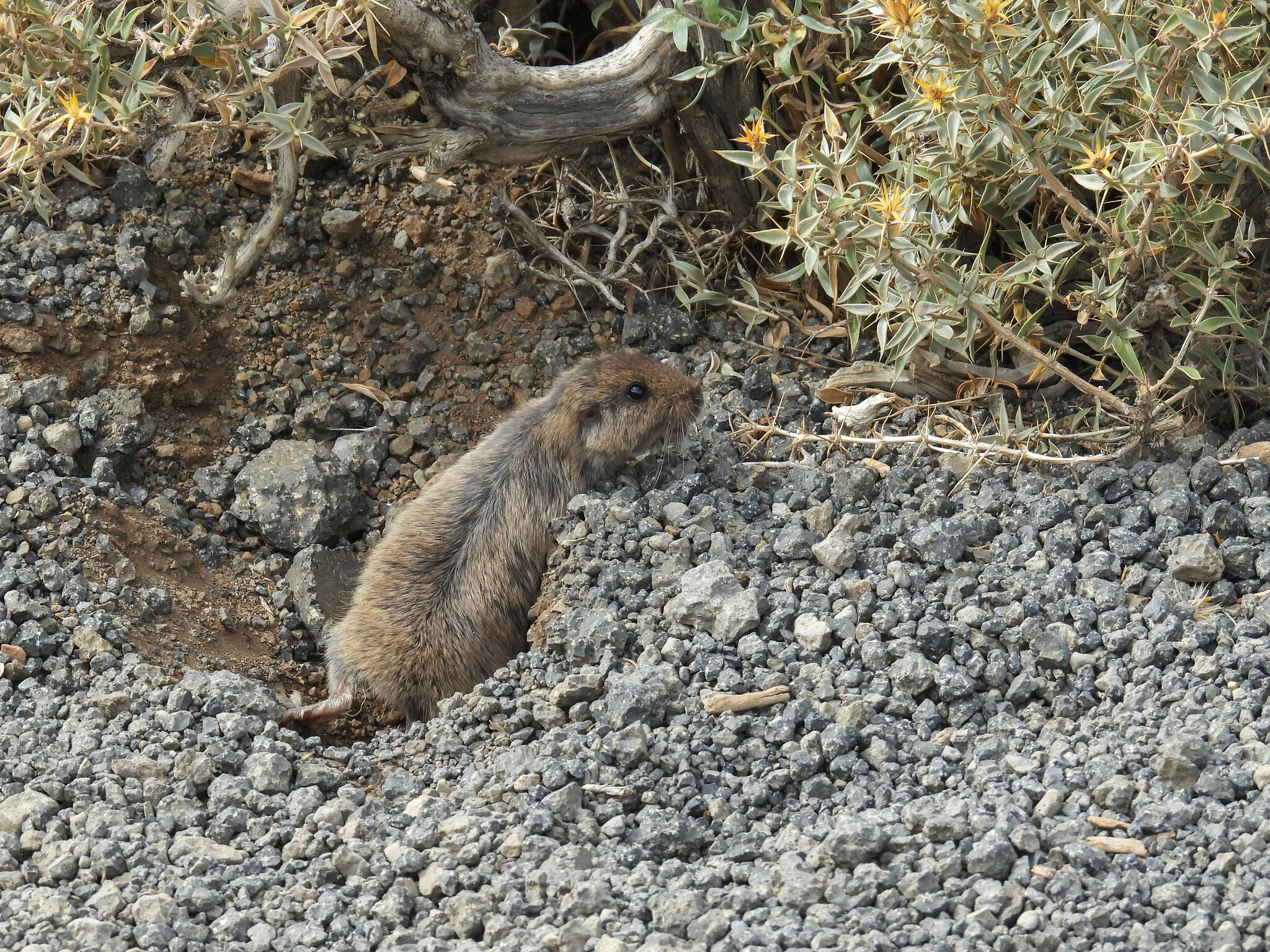

Conservation status
- Least Concern (IUCN 3.1)

Scientific classification
- Kingdom: Animalia
- Phylum: Chordata
- Class: Mammalia
- Infraclass: Placentalia
- Order: Rodentia
- Family: Ctenomyidae
- Genus: Ctenomys
- Species: C. maulinus

Binomial name
- Ctenomys maulinus Philippi, 1872

Subspecies
- C. m. brunneus Osgood, 1943; C. m. maulinus Philippi, 1872

= Maule tuco-tuco =

Species of rodent

The Maule tuco-tuco (Ctenomys maulinus) is a species of rodent in the family Ctenomyidae. It is found in Argentina and Chile, where it occupies several different types of habitats. It is a common species, and the IUCN has assessed its conservation status as being of "least concern". The common and scientific names refer to a river and region in Chile within its range.

== Description ==
The Maule tuco-tuco is a medium-sized tuco-tuco, there being two subspecies, C. m. maulinus and C. m. brunneus, the former growing to a total length of 275 mm (10.8 in) and the latter 305 mm (12.0 in). C. m. maulinus is a uniform pale brown colour with a similarly coloured tail terminating in a white "pencil" or tuft of hair. By contrast, C. m. brunneus has a more intense brown colour, with the feet, the underside of the tail and the tail-tip pencil being buff-white.

== Distribution and habitat ==
The nominate subspecies C. m. maulinus is found in Talca Province, Chile while C. m. brunneus occurs in Mallecco Province and Cautín Province, Chile, at altitudes between about 1,000 and 2,000 m (3,300 and 6,600 ft). More recently, this tuco-tuco has been discovered in Neuquén Province and Río Negro Province in Argentina, but it is unclear which of the two subspecies was involved in these sightings. This tuco-tuco inhabits different habitat types, including Nothofagus and Araucaria woodland and open areas where the soil consists of volcanic sands. The range of this species may overlap that of the social tuco-tuco (Ctenomys sociabilis).

== Ecology ==
Like other tuco-tucos, this species is a burrowing rodent that feeds on vegetable matter such as roots and grasses. Two burrows have been excavated and found to extend for 14 and 49 m (46 and 161 ft). Some food is taken back to the burrow and stored there in special chambers. In a cave in Neuquén Province, Argentina, owl pellets dating back more than 5,000 years have been discovered which contain skin fragments and bones of a large species of tuco-tuco, which is probably the Maule tuco-tuco.

== Status ==
C. maulinus has a wide range in Chile and northern Argentina, where it is found at altitudes between about 900 and 2,000 m (3,000 and 6,600 ft). This tuco-tuco is present in several protected areas and is assumed to have a large total population. No particular threats have been identified and any downward trend in populations is likely to be slow, so the International Union for Conservation of Nature has assessed its conservation status as being of "least concern".
