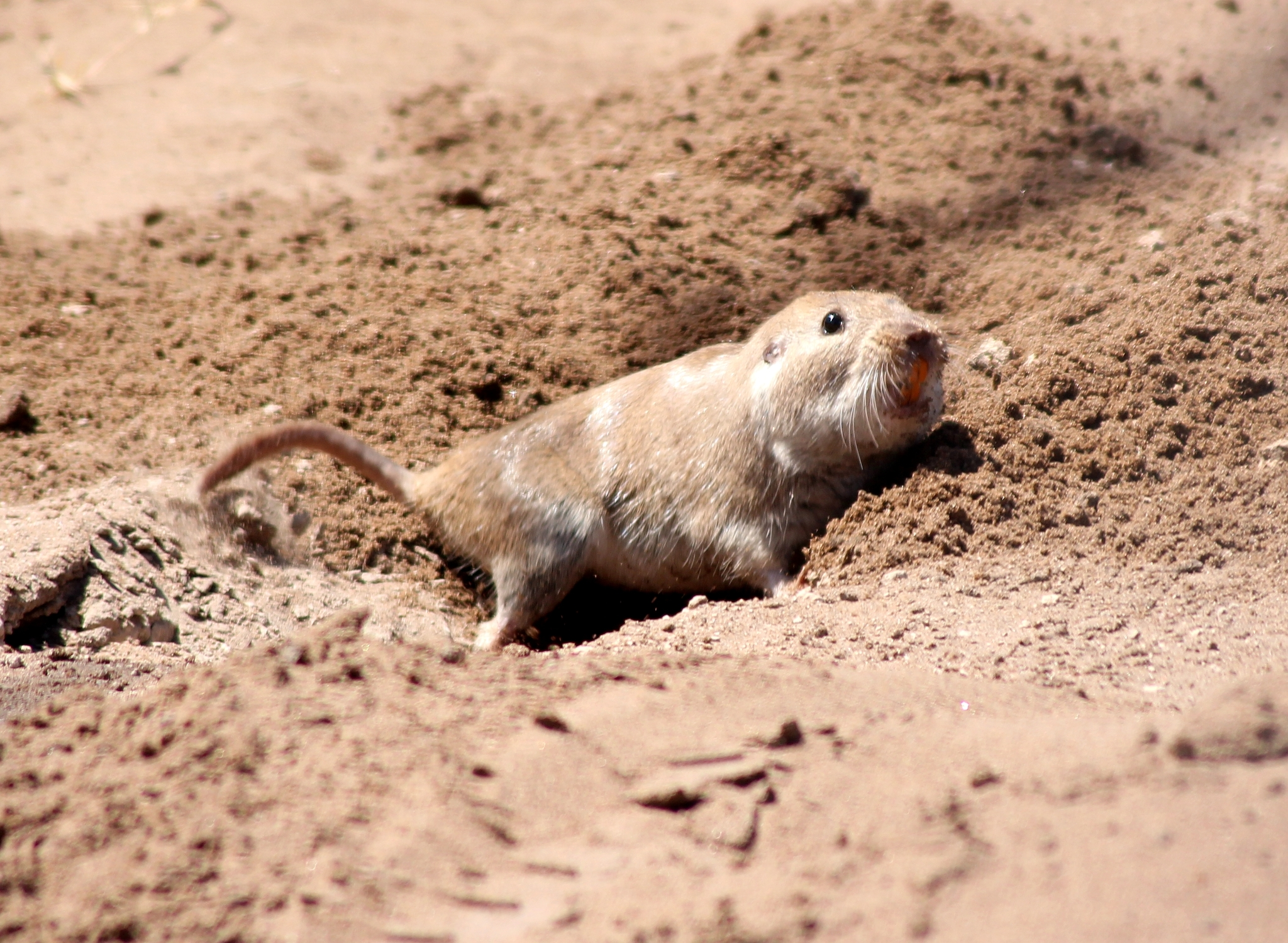

Conservation status
- Endangered (IUCN 3.1)

Scientific classification
- Kingdom: Animalia
- Phylum: Chordata
- Class: Mammalia
- Order: Rodentia
- Family: Ctenomyidae
- Genus: Ctenomys
- Species: C. australis

Binomial name
- Ctenomys australis Rusconi, 1934

= Southern tuco-tuco =

Species of rodent

The southern tuco-tuco (Ctenomys australis) is a species of rodent in the family Ctenomyidae. It is endemic to Argentina.

== Anatomy ==
The southern tuco-tuco is a large rodent, ranging in weight from 250–600 grams. Its head-body length is 15–25 cm, while its tail length is 6–11 cm. At this size, it is one of the largest species within the genus Ctenomys.

They are characterized by their large head, short legs, and considerable incisors. Their pelage ranges in color from dark brown to black with pale-grey underparts, resembling the sandy soil of its habitat. Its tail, however, has no hair.

== Distribution ==
The southern tuco-tuco lives sympatrically with the Talas tuco-tuco (C. talarum) in the coastal grassland and sand dune areas of the Buenos Aires Province, Argentina along the Atlantic coast. Its region ranges from Necochea to Bahia Blanca. Though these two species live in the same region, they are microspacially segregated based on their different preferences in soil type. The southern tuco-tuco prefers softer soil with poor and low primary productivity.

== Habitat ==
The southern tuco-tuco lives in sand dunes, building large burrow systems in areas with scarce vegetation and deep soil.

== Behavior ==
Southern tuco-tucos are highly territorial and aggressive. They prefer to live solitary lives, and are suggested to be polygamous.

As for dietary consideration, they are herbivorous, feeding on almost all of the plant species available in the grassland area. They have been observed to prefer grasses over forbs throughout the year.

== Reproduction ==
The gestation period of the southern tuco-tuco is 100 days and can reproduce up to two times per year. On average, there are approximately 3 young born in a litter, though anywhere between 2 and 6 pups can be born.

== Predation ==
The Southern tuco-tuco can be preyed on by owls, though this is more likely to occur in their sympatric relative, the Talas tuco-tuco due to its difference in size.

== Habitat destruction ==
The sand dune habitats are currently being destroyed for the development of urban areas, forestry, and grassland advancement. Therefore, the survival of the species is threatened, as they depend greatly on the sand dune ecosystem.
