= Jujuy tuco-tuco =

Conservation status
- Data Deficient (IUCN 3.1)

Scientific classification
- Kingdom: Animalia
- Phylum: Chordata
- Class: Mammalia
- Order: Rodentia
- Family: Ctenomyidae
- Genus: Ctenomys
- Species: C. juris

Binomial name
- Ctenomys juris Thomas, 1920

Species of rodent

The Jujuy tuco-tuco (Ctenomys juris) is a species of rodent in the family Ctenomyidae. It is known only from one location at an elevation of 500 m in southeastern Jujuy Province of northern Argentina.
