= Lago Blanco tuco-tuco =

Conservation status
- Data Deficient (IUCN 3.1)

Scientific classification
- Kingdom: Animalia
- Phylum: Chordata
- Class: Mammalia
- Order: Rodentia
- Family: Ctenomyidae
- Genus: Ctenomys
- Species: C. fodax

Binomial name
- Ctenomys fodax Thomas, 1910

Species of rodent

The Lago Blanco tuco-tuco (Ctenomys fodax) is a species of rodent in the family Ctenomyidae. It is known only from the Lago Blanco area in southern Argentina. Its karyotype has 2n = 28 and FN = 42.
