= Goya tuco-tuco =

Conservation status
- Least Concern (IUCN 3.1)

Scientific classification
- Kingdom: Animalia
- Phylum: Chordata
- Class: Mammalia
- Order: Rodentia
- Family: Ctenomyidae
- Genus: Ctenomys
- Species: C. perrensi

Binomial name
- Ctenomys perrensi Thomas, 1898

Species of rodent

The Goya tuco-tuco (Ctenomys perrensi) is a species of rodent in the family Ctenomyidae. It is endemic to Argentina.
