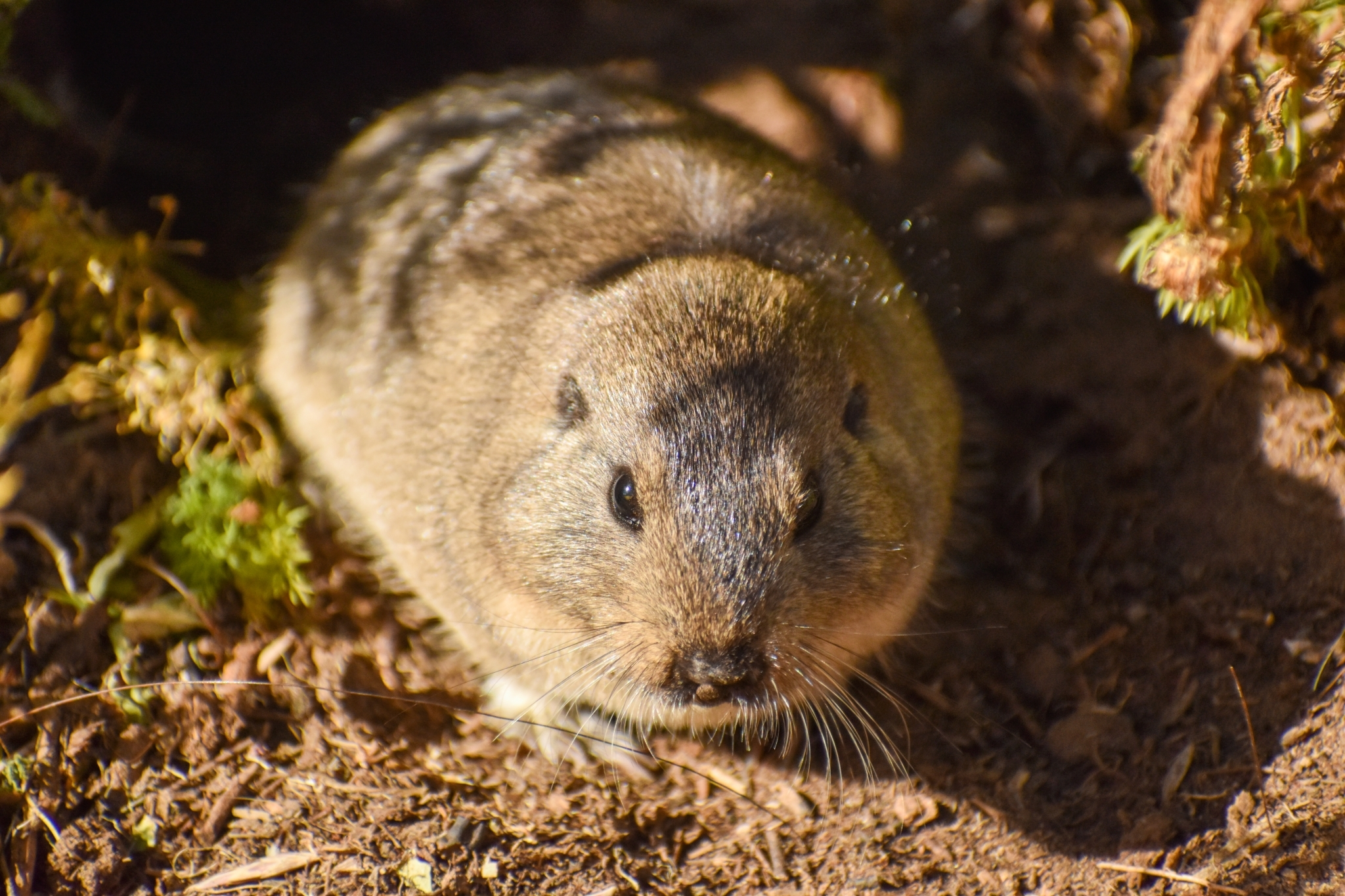

Conservation status
- Data Deficient (IUCN 3.1)

Scientific classification
- Kingdom: Animalia
- Phylum: Chordata
- Class: Mammalia
- Order: Rodentia
- Family: Ctenomyidae
- Genus: Ctenomys
- Species: C. sericeus

Binomial name
- Ctenomys sericeus J. A. Allen, 1903

= Silky tuco-tuco =

Species of rodent

The silky tuco-tuco (Ctenomys sericeus) is a species of rodent in the family Ctenomyidae. It is endemic to Argentina.
