= Conover's tuco-tuco =

Conservation status
- Least Concern (IUCN 3.1)

Scientific classification
- Kingdom: Animalia
- Phylum: Chordata
- Class: Mammalia
- Order: Rodentia
- Family: Ctenomyidae
- Genus: Ctenomys
- Species: C. conoveri

Binomial name
- Ctenomys conoveri Osgood, 1946

Species of rodent

Conover's tuco-tuco (Ctenomys conoveri) is a species of rodent in the family Ctenomyidae. It is found in Argentina, Bolivia, and Paraguay.
