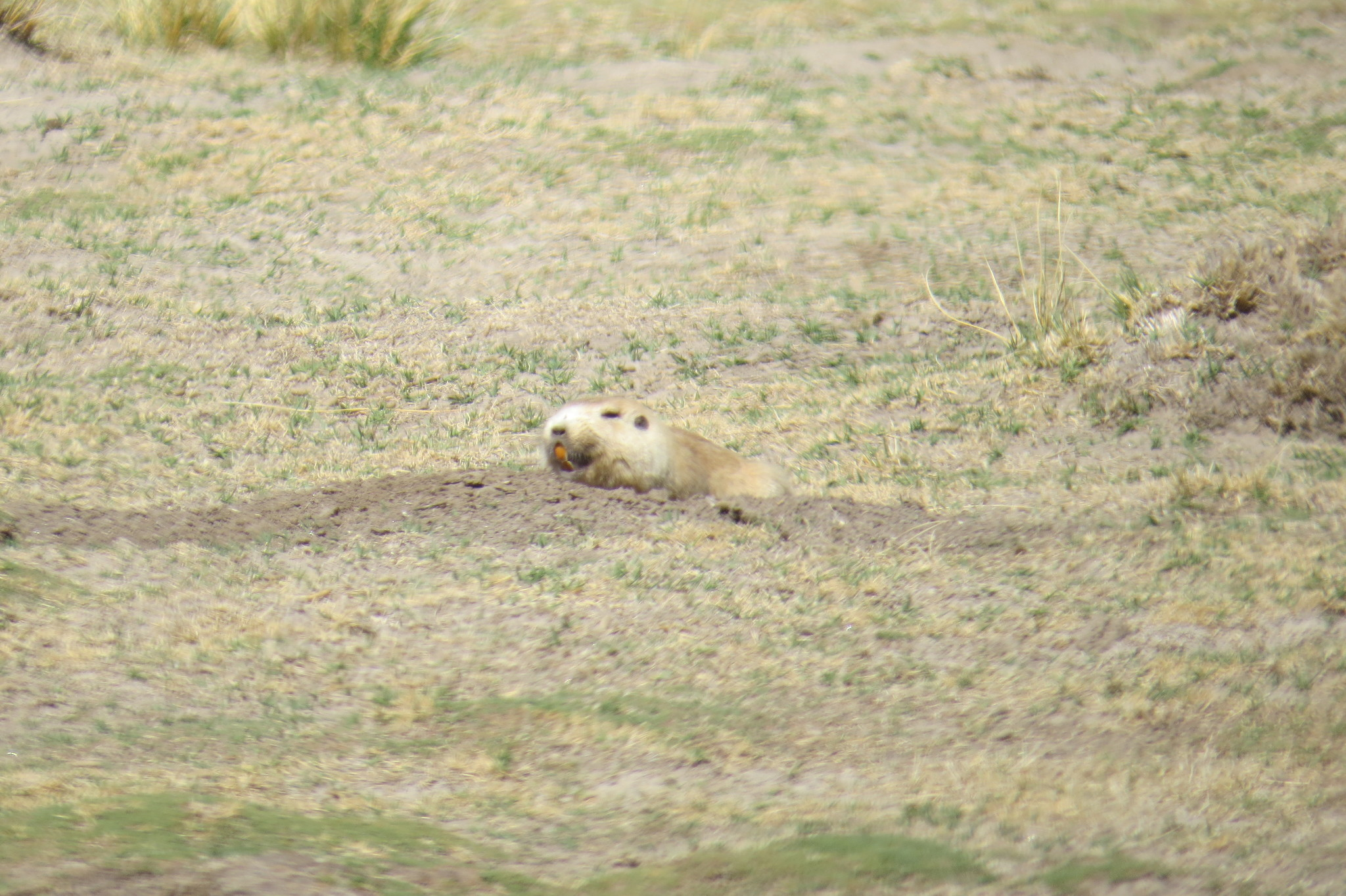

Conservation status
- Least Concern (IUCN 3.1)

Scientific classification
- Kingdom: Animalia
- Phylum: Chordata
- Class: Mammalia
- Infraclass: Placentalia
- Order: Rodentia
- Family: Ctenomyidae
- Genus: Ctenomys
- Species: C. opimus

Binomial name
- Ctenomys opimus Wagner, 1848

Subspecies
- C. o. luteolus Thomas, 1900; C. o. nigriceps Thomas, 1900; C. o. opimus Wagner, 1848

= Highland tuco-tuco =

Species of rodent

The highland tuco-tuco (Ctenomys opimus) is a species of rodent in the family Ctenomyidae. It is found in high grassland in Argentina, Bolivia, Chile, and Peru where it lives in burrows.

== Description ==
Tuco-tucos live in burrows and have a number of adaptations to suit this lifestyle. The tail is short, the eyes are small and the external ears are short, while the claws on the front feet are large and strong. The fur of the highland tuco-tuco is longer and softer than other tuco-tucos. The head is dark-coloured, the upper parts are light brown or yellowish-grey and the flanks and underparts are paler. Fat is accumulated under the skin and males are larger than females. The front surfaces of the incisors are bright yellowish-orange.

== Distribution and habitat ==
The highland tuco-tuco lives on the eastern side of the Andes range in the southern half of South America. Its range includes southwestern Bolivia, northwestern Argentina, southern Peru and northern Chile, where it is present at altitudes ranging from 2,500 to 5,000 m (8,200 to 16,400 ft) above sea level. It is found in dry puna grassland where it digs its burrows in loose gravelly and sandy soils in both pristine and disturbed habitats.

== Ecology ==
This tuco-tuco lives alone in an extensive burrow it digs. Soil is loosened with the forelimbs and pushed backwards by the hind limbs. There is usually a main passage with short side passages every few metres, one or more chambers for storing food and others for nesting. Most activity is in the morning with the animal expanding the tunnel to reach the roots and stems on which it feeds, and only emerging from the burrow briefly to gather nearby food before retreating again. Litters of up to six young are born during summer.

== Status ==
C. opimus has a wide range and is a common species in some localities. In Peru it has been reported at densities of up to 17 individuals per acre. No particular threats have been identified and the International Union for Conservation of Nature has rated its conservation status as being of "least concern".
