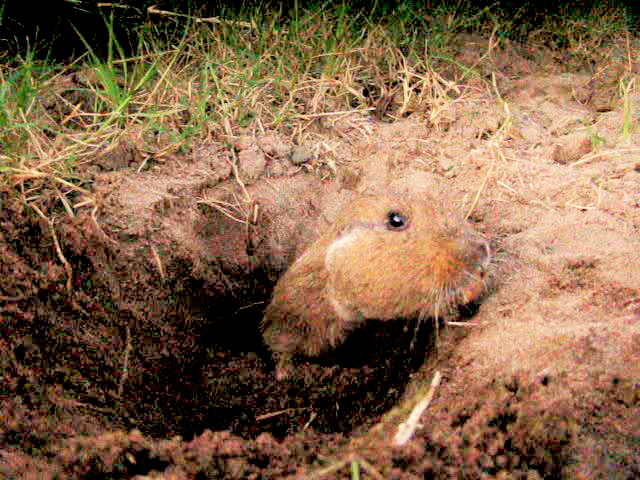

Conservation status
- Least Concern (IUCN 3.1)

Scientific classification
- Kingdom: Animalia
- Phylum: Chordata
- Class: Mammalia
- Order: Rodentia
- Family: Ctenomyidae
- Genus: Ctenomys
- Species: C. torquatus

Binomial name
- Ctenomys torquatus Lichtenstein, 1830

= Collared tuco-tuco =

Species of rodent

The collared tuco-tuco (Ctenomys torquatus) is a tuco-tuco species from South America. It is found in southern Brazil, Uruguay and northern Argentina, where it lives underground in a burrow it digs in savannah habitats. It is a relatively common species and the IUCN has assessed its conservation status as being of "least concern".

== Description ==
The collared tuco-tuco is a short-tailed rodent with a total length of about 250 mm (10 in), including a tail of 75 mm (3 in). It varies considerably in colour across its range and between different members of the same population. The upper parts can be anything from mahogany brown to yellowish-brown, and the flanks and underparts are yellowish white. Most animals have a paler collar of yellowish-white and many have pale patches in the armpit and groin. The tail is dark brown above and below.

== Distribution and habitat ==
The collared tuco-tuco is native to southern Brazil, Uruguay, and northern Argentina, where it is found in the provinces of Entre Ríos and Corrientes. Its typical habitat is high, dry savannah country with sandy, rock-free soils. It does not inhabit cultivated land.

== Ecology ==
Except during the breeding season, this animal is solitary. It lives in a burrow which is usually less than 50 cm (20 in) below the surface of the ground and may be several metres in length. Side passages are used for storing food. It is a herbivore and usually eats the whole plant on which it is feeding; it is diurnal and rather secretive, emerging only briefly from the entrance to its burrow to forage.

Breeding takes place once a year between June and October. After a gestation period of about 105 days, a litter of two or three young is born underground.

== Status ==
The collared tuco-tuco has a wide range and is presumed to have a large population. In Brazil it is threatened by increasing cultivation of its habitat, the planting of pine and Eucalyptus plantations, and the strip-mining of coal. No other particular threats have been identified and the International Union for Conservation of Nature has assessed its conservation status as being of "least concern".
