= Vipos tuco-tuco =

Conservation status
- Data Deficient (IUCN 3.1)

Scientific classification
- Kingdom: Animalia
- Phylum: Chordata
- Class: Mammalia
- Order: Rodentia
- Family: Ctenomyidae
- Genus: Ctenomys
- Species: C. viperinus

Binomial name
- Ctenomys viperinus Thomas, 1926

Species of rodent

The Vipos tuco-tuco (Ctenomys viperinus) is a species of rodent in the family of Ctenomyidae. It is endemic to the northern Tucumán Province in northern Argentina. The common name is a reference to the city of Vipos in the area.
