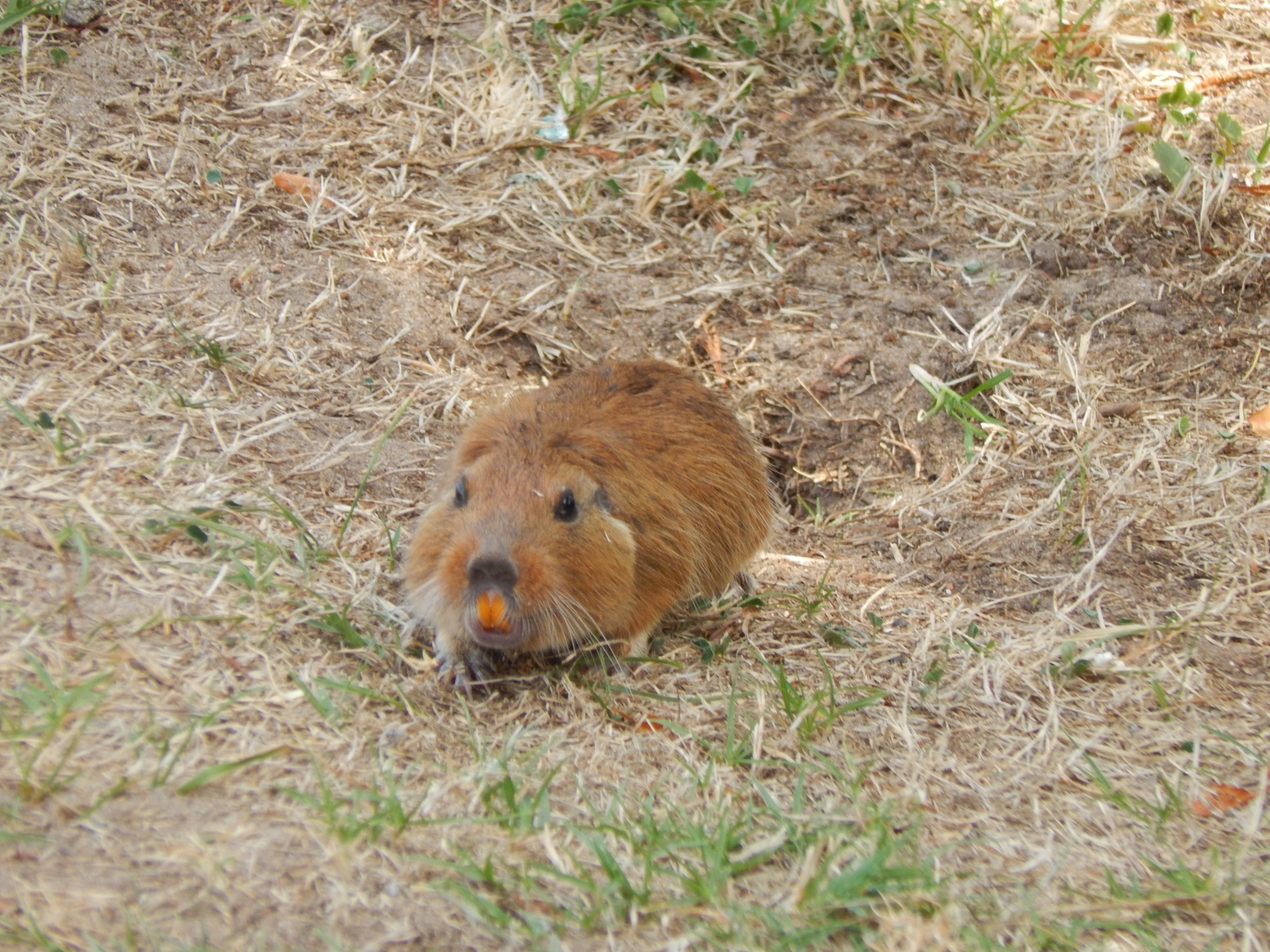

Conservation status
- Near Threatened (IUCN 3.1)

Scientific classification
- Kingdom: Animalia
- Phylum: Chordata
- Class: Mammalia
- Order: Rodentia
- Family: Ctenomyidae
- Genus: Ctenomys
- Species: C. pearsoni

Binomial name
- Ctenomys pearsoni Lessa & Langguth, 1983

= Pearson's tuco-tuco =

Species of rodent

Pearson's tuco-tuco (Ctenomys pearsoni) is a species of rodent in the family Ctenomyidae. It is endemic to Uruguay, where it is found at elevations below 200 m. This tuco-tuco constructs burrows with multiple openings (an average of 13) containing one to two nests of dried grass; it prefers areas of sandy soil but is somewhat adaptable. It is threatened by loss of habitat to development, agriculture and ranching. Multiple karyotypes have been reported, including 2n = 68–70, FN = 80–88, as well as 2n = 56, FN = 77–79, suggesting the taxon may represent several species. C. dorbignyi appears to be cytogenetically indistinguishable from the 2n = 70 form. The species is named after American zoologist Oliver Payne Pearson.
