= Chacoan tuco-tuco =

Conservation status
- Data Deficient (IUCN 3.1)

Scientific classification
- Kingdom: Animalia
- Phylum: Chordata
- Class: Mammalia
- Order: Rodentia
- Family: Ctenomyidae
- Genus: Ctenomys
- Species: C. dorsalis

Binomial name
- Ctenomys dorsalis Thomas, 1900

Species of rodent

The Chacoan tuco-tuco (Ctenomys dorsalis) is a species of rodent in the family Ctenomyidae. It lives in Bolivia and Paraguay.
