= Coyhaique tuco-tuco =

Conservation status
- Data Deficient (IUCN 3.1)

Scientific classification
- Kingdom: Animalia
- Phylum: Chordata
- Class: Mammalia
- Order: Rodentia
- Family: Ctenomyidae
- Genus: Ctenomys
- Species: C. coyhaiquensis

Binomial name
- Ctenomys coyhaiquensis Kelt & Gallardo, 1994

Species of rodent

The Coyhaique tuco-tuco (Ctenomys coyhaiquensis) is a species of rodent in the family Ctenomyidae. It is endemic to southern Chile. The name comes from the Chilean province and municipality of Coyhaique.
