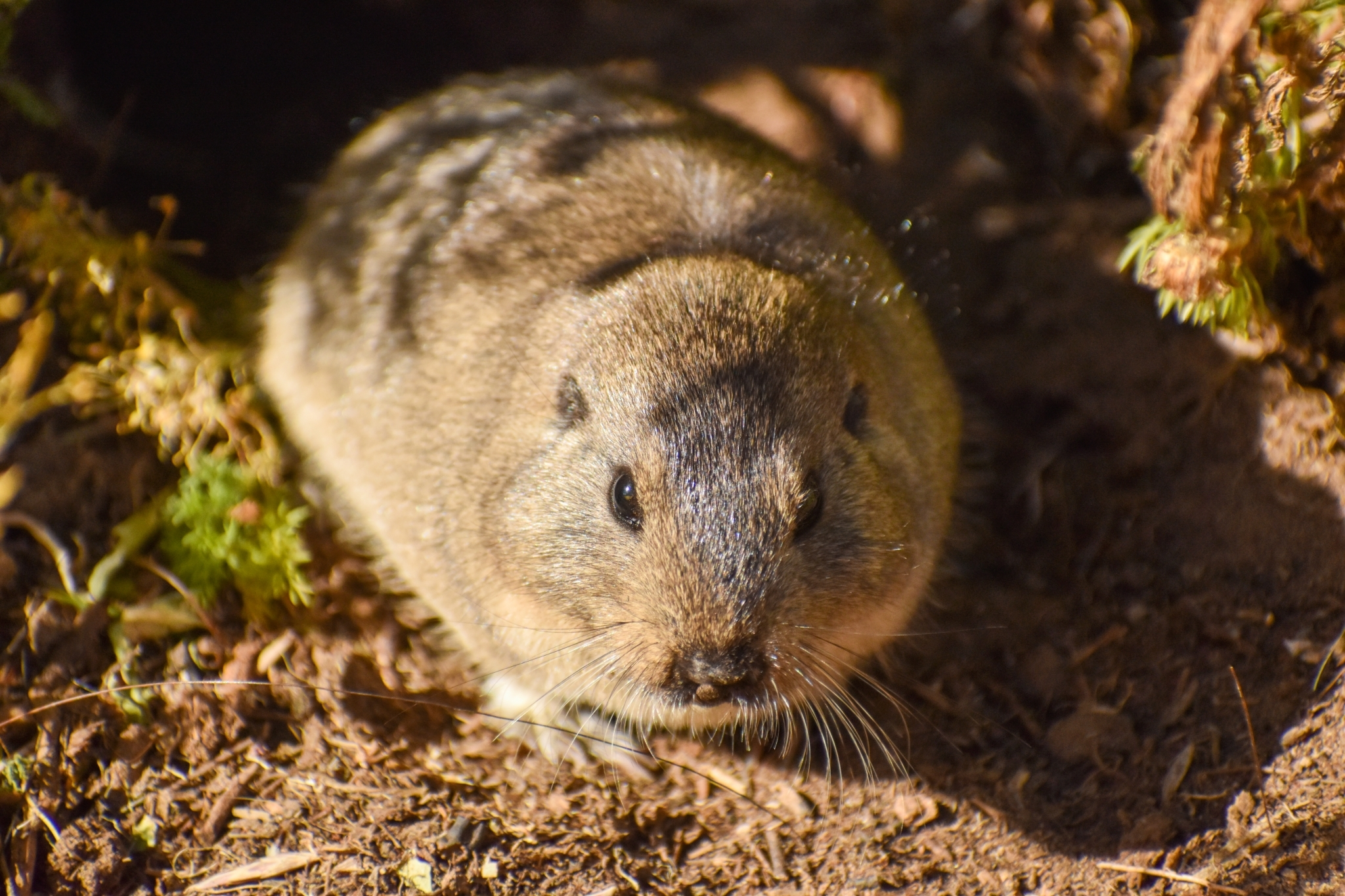
- Silky tuco-tuco (Ctenomys sericeus)

Scientific classification
- Kingdom: Animalia
- Phylum: Chordata
- Class: Mammalia
- Order: Rodentia
- Suborder: Hystricomorpha
- Infraorder: Hystricognathi
- Parvorder: Caviomorpha
- Superfamily: Octodontoidea
- Family: Ctenomyidae; Lesson, 1842
- Genus: Ctenomys; Blainville, 1826

Type species
- Ctenomys brasiliensis Blainville, 1826

Species
- See text
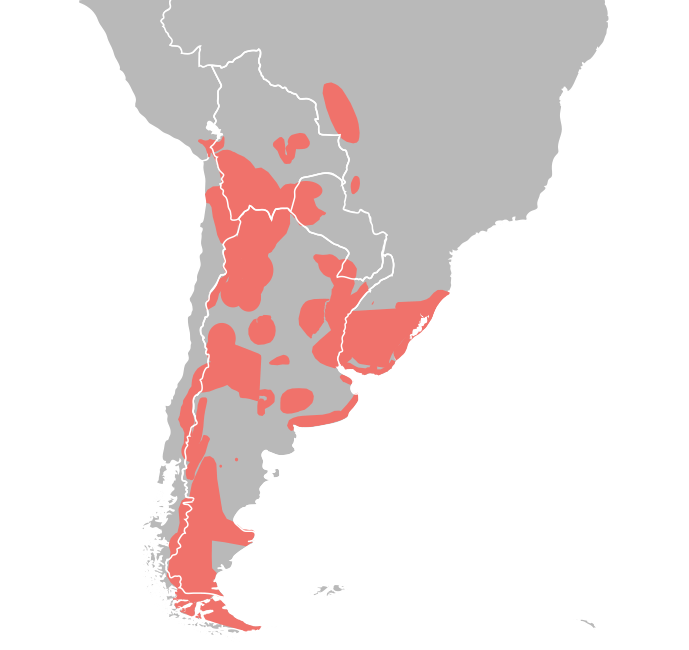
- Ctenomyidae distribution

= Tuco-tuco =

Tuco-tuco Temporal range: Late Pliocene–Recent

Genus of rodents

A tuco-tuco is a neotropical rodent in the family Ctenomyidae found in South America from Peru and central Brazil southward. The only living genus of the family, Ctenomys, includes approximately 60 different species. The relationships among the species are debated by taxonomists. It has been described that they are in a state of "taxonomic chaos", but banded karyotypes have been used to help make progress on their taxonomic study. Their closest relatives are degus and other octodontids.

The common name, "tuco-tuco", comes from the "tuc-tuc" sound they make while they dig their burrows. In South America they have an ecological role equivalent to that of the pocket gophers of North America.

They occupy an ecological niche previously taken by gondwanatheres such as Patagonia earlier in the Cenozoic.

== Anatomy ==
Tuco-tucos have heavily built cylindrical bodies with short legs and their pelage ranges in color from black to light grey. Their skin is loosely applied, possibly to slide about the tunnels they create. They have long forefeet for burrowing, and bristled hindfeet for grooming. They also have large heads, small ears, and hairy tails. Their bodies range in size from 15–25 cm (5.9–9.8 in) in length, and they can weigh as little as 100 grams (3.5 oz) (C. pundti) to more than 1,000 grams (35 oz) (C. conover).

== Distribution ==
Members of the genus Ctenomys are widely distributed, but over 50 of the species are found in the southern half of South America. They can be seen in many areas from the southern portion of Peru and southern Brazil to the Tierra del Fuego at the southernmost tip of South America, through parts of Chile and a majority of Uruguay, Paraguay, Bolivia, and Argentina. Their ranges occur from coastal grasslands to mountain slopes, including the Andean Puna at over 4,000 metres (13,000 ft), and depend on factors such as soil type, ambient temperature, and primary productivity. The only sympatric speciation of this genus occurs between C. australis and C. talarum in a coastal dune region.

=== Habitat ===
Tuco-tucos are fossorial, living in excavated burrows; they spend the majority (up to 90%) of their lives underground. It is estimated that they represent about 45% of all the underground rodents of the world. Their burrows maintain a fairly constant temperature and humidity level that is independent of the geographic region. In order to excavate the soil, they have many morphological adaptations, including their body shape, reduced eyes, and strong limbs. They have a strong sense of smell which is used to help orient themselves during digging and establishing a territory.

The two techniques they use for digging are scratch-digging and skull-tooth digging. A combination of the two methods are often used. Their claws and forelimbs are used primarily for scratch-digging, and their skull and incisor teeth are used secondarily for skull-tooth digging.

== Behavior ==
Tuco-tucos are diurnal and alternate periods of activity and periods of rest throughout the day.

=== Food ===
They primarily search for food by digging passageways. Due to the high energy cost of foraging for food, their diet is rather broad.

=== Courtship ===
Very little is known about the courtship of the tuco-tucos, as it takes place underground inside their burrows. It is known that the male takes an aggressive posture and exchanges chemical or acoustic signals with the female.

== Diversity ==
Among their most notable features is that various members of the genus exhibit differing levels of genetic diversity and sociality. Most of these species are solitary animals; however, some are semi-social, or social, with a tendency for the most social species (e.g. C. sociabilis) to have the least genetic variation.

While the processes behind its genetic divergence are unknown, it has been suggested that they are among the most diversely speciated genus of mammals, largely due to chromosomal rearrangements and rapid speciation since their appearance in the late Pliocene or early Pleistocene eras. Their chromosomal diversity is so impressive because their diploid numbers range from 10 to 70.

== Human impact ==
The species in this genus are at risk of predation by humans because they are viewed as agricultural pests.

=== Indigenous people ===
Prior to the European settlement the tuco-tuco was an important food resource in Tierra del Fuego, for the Fuegians in particular.

== Species ==
Anderson's cujuchi (C. andersoni)
Argentine tuco-tuco (C. argentinus)
Southern tuco-tuco (C. australis)
Berg's tuco-tuco (C. bergi)
Bidau's tuco-tuco (C. bidaui)
Bolivian tuco-tuco (C. boliviensis)
Bonetto's tuco-tuco (C. bonettoi)
Brazilian tuco-tuco (C. brasiliensis)
Colburn's tuco-tuco (C. colburni)
Puntilla tuco-tuco (C. coludo)
Conover's tuco-tuco (C. conoveri)
Contreras' tuco-tuco (C. contrerasi)
Coyhaique tuco-tuco (C. coyhaiquensis)
D'Orbigny's tuco-tuco (C. dorbignyi)
Chacoan tuco-tuco (C. dorsalis)
Emily's tuco-tuco (C. emilianus)
Erika's tuco-tuco (C. erikacuellarae)
Famatina tuco-tuco (C. famosus)
Flamarion's tuco-tuco (C. flamarioni)
Foch's tuco-tuco (C. fochi)
Lago Blanco tuco-tuco (C. fodax)
Reddish tuco-tuco (C. frater)
Tawny tuco-tuco (C. fulvus)
Goodfellow's tuco-tuco (C. goodfellowi)
Haig's tuco-tuco (C. haigi)
Ibicui tuco-tuco (C. ibicuiensis)
San Juan tuco-tuco (C. johannis)
Jujuy tuco-tuco (C. juris)
Catamarca tuco-tuco (C. knighti)
Lami tuco-tuco (C. lami)
Mottled tuco-tuco (C. latro)
Lessa's tuco-tuco (C. lessai)
White-toothed tuco-tuco (C. leucodon)
Lewis's tuco-tuco (C. lewisi)
Magellanic tuco-tuco (C. magellanicus)
Maule tuco-tuco (C. maulinus)
Mendoza tuco-tuco (C. mendocinus)
Tiny tuco-tuco (C. minutus)
Natterer's tuco-tuco (C. nattereri)
Furtive tuco-tuco (C. occultus)
Highland tuco-tuco (C. opimus)
Reig's tuco-tuco (C. osvaldoreigi)
Pearson's tuco-tuco (C. pearsoni)
Goya tuco-tuco (C. perrensi)
Peruvian tuco-tuco (C. peruanus)
Pilar tuco-tuco (C. pilarensis)
Plebiscite tuco-tuco (C. plebiscitum)
San Luis tuco-tuco (C. pontifex)
Pundt's tuco-tuco (C. pundti)
Rio Negro tuco-tuco (C. rionegrensis)
Roig's tuco-tuco (C. roigi)
Salta tuco-tuco (C. saltarius)
Scaglia's tuco-tuco (C. scagliai)
Silky tuco-tuco (C. sericeus)
Social tuco-tuco (C. sociabilis)
Steinbach's tuco-tuco (C. steinbachi)
Talas tuco-tuco (C. talarum)
Thales's tuco-tuco (C. thalesi)
Collared tuco-tuco (C. torquatus)
Robust tuco-tuco (C. tuconax)
Tucuman tuco-tuco (C. tucumanus)
Sierra Tontal tuco-tuco (C. tulduco)
Strong tuco-tuco (C. validus)
Vipos tuco-tuco (C. viperinus)
Yates' tuco-tuco (C. yatesi)
Yolanda's tuco-tuco (C. yolandae)

A fossil species Ctenomys viarapaensis is known from Holocene remains found in central Argentina.
