= Ibicui tuco-tuco =

Conservation status
- Data Deficient (IUCN 3.1)

Scientific classification
- Kingdom: Animalia
- Phylum: Chordata
- Class: Mammalia
- Order: Rodentia
- Family: Ctenomyidae
- Genus: Ctenomys
- Species: C. ibicuiensis

Binomial name
- Ctenomys ibicuiensis de Freitas, Fernandes, Fornel & Roratto, 2012

Species of rodent

The Ibicui tuco-tuco (Ctenomys ibicuiensis) is a species of rodent in the family Ctenomyidae. It is endemic to southern Brazil.
