= Scaglia's tuco-tuco =

Conservation status
- Data Deficient (IUCN 3.1)

Scientific classification
- Kingdom: Animalia
- Phylum: Chordata
- Class: Mammalia
- Order: Rodentia
- Family: Ctenomyidae
- Genus: Ctenomys
- Species: C. scagliai

Binomial name
- Ctenomys scagliai Contreras, 1999

Species of rodent

Scaglia's tuco-tuco (Ctenomys scagliai) is a species of rodent in the family Ctenomyidae, endemic to a locality in Tucumán Province, northern Argentina. The species is named after Argentine naturalist Galileo Juan Scaglia (1915–1989). Its karyotype has 2n = 36 and FN = 64.
