= D'Orbigny's tuco-tuco =

Conservation status
- Near Threatened (IUCN 3.1)

Scientific classification
- Domain: Eukaryota
- Kingdom: Animalia
- Phylum: Chordata
- Class: Mammalia
- Order: Rodentia
- Family: Ctenomyidae
- Genus: Ctenomys
- Species: C. dorbignyi

Binomial name
- Ctenomys dorbignyi Contreras & Contreras, 1984
- Geographic range

Species of rodent

D'Orbigny's tuco-tuco (Ctenomys dorbignyi) is a species of rodent in the family Ctenomyidae, named after French naturalist Alcide d'Orbigny. It is found in northeast Argentina. Its karyotype has 2n = 70, FN = 84–88, which is cytogenetically indistinguishable from some populations of C. pearsoni; the latter taxon may actually represent several species.

== See also ==
- List of mammals of Argentina
- List of rodents
