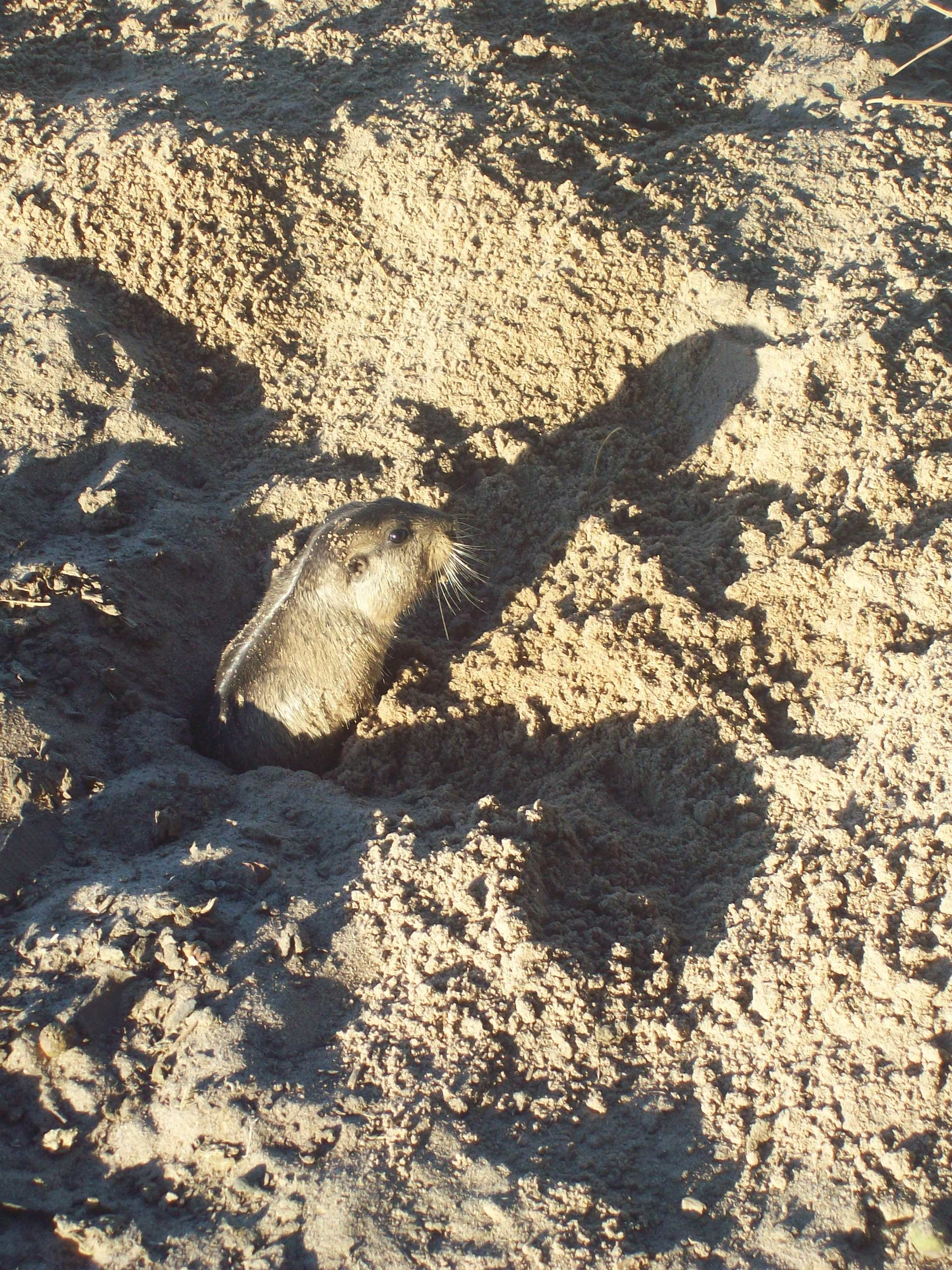
- Anguyá-tutú digging in the ground in Goya, Corrientes, Argentina.

Conservation status
- Endangered (IUCN 3.1)

Scientific classification
- Kingdom: Animalia
- Phylum: Chordata
- Class: Mammalia
- Infraclass: Placentalia
- Order: Rodentia
- Family: Ctenomyidae
- Genus: Ctenomys
- Species: C. bonettoi

Binomial name
- Ctenomys bonettoi Contreras & Berry, 1982

= Bonetto's tuco-tuco =

Species of rodent

Bonetto's tuco-tuco (Ctenomys bonettoi) is a species of rodent in the family Ctenomyidae. It is endemic to Argentina.
