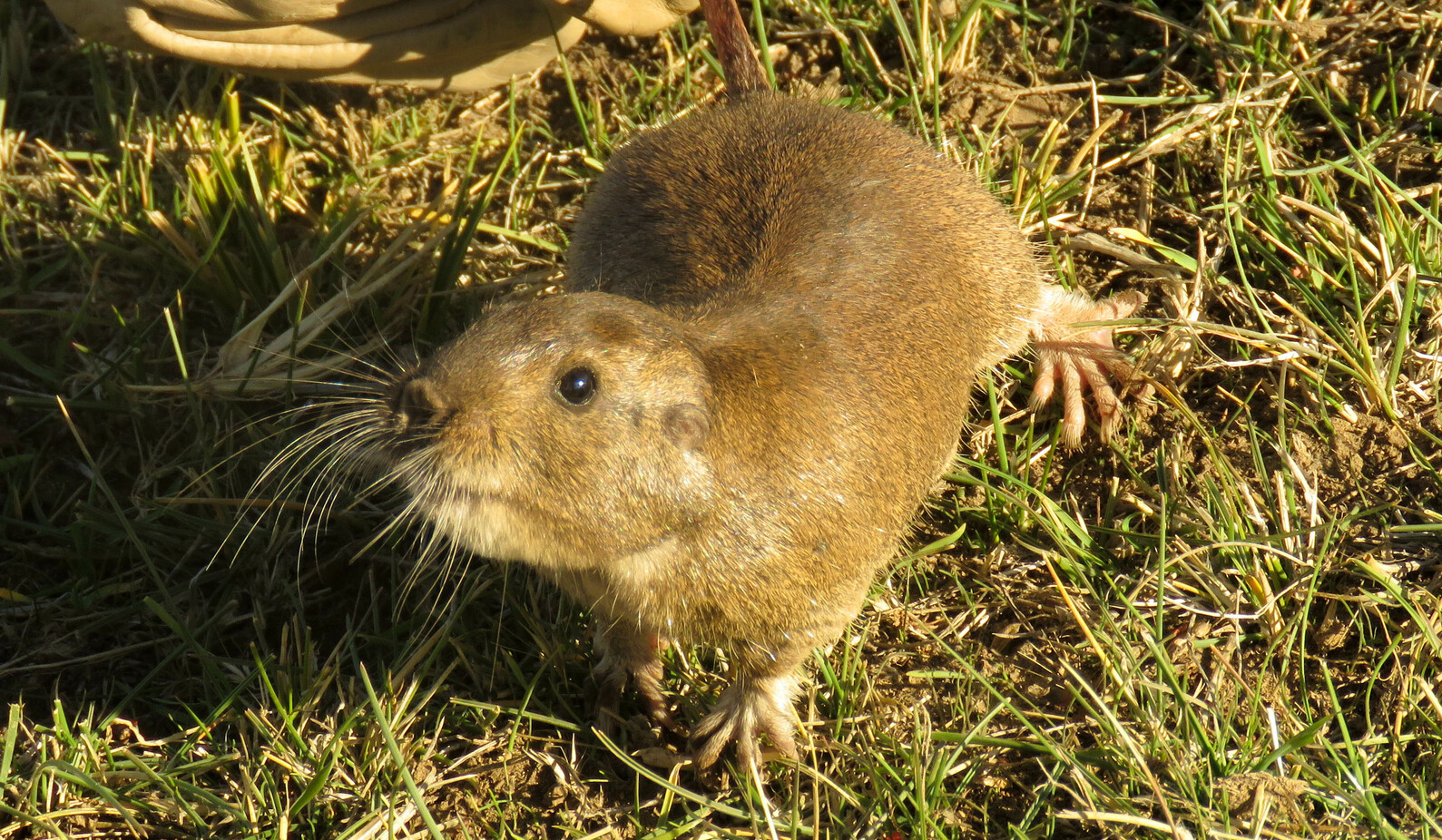

Conservation status
- Least Concern (IUCN 3.1)

Scientific classification
- Kingdom: Animalia
- Phylum: Chordata
- Class: Mammalia
- Order: Rodentia
- Family: Ctenomyidae
- Genus: Ctenomys
- Species: C. haigi

Binomial name
- Ctenomys haigi Thomas, 1917

Subspecies
- C. h. haigi Thomas, 1917; C. h. lentulus Thomas, 1919

= Haig's tuco-tuco =

Species of rodent

Haig's tuco-tuco (Ctenomys haigi), known regionally as the Patagonian tuco-tuco, is a hystricognath rodent. Like other tuco-tucos it is subterranean and thus not often observed, although the "tuc-tuc" call of the males can be heard near burrow sites, especially in the early morning. Like most species in the genus Ctenomys, C. haigi are solitary, with one adult per burrow.

Haig's tuco-tuco is native to Argentine Patagonia. Its primary habitat is the Patagonian steppe, but it is also found in the Low Monte and Valdivian temperate rain forest ecoregions.
