= Salta tuco-tuco =

Conservation status
- Data Deficient (IUCN 3.1)

Scientific classification
- Kingdom: Animalia
- Phylum: Chordata
- Class: Mammalia
- Order: Rodentia
- Family: Ctenomyidae
- Genus: Ctenomys
- Species: C. saltarius

Binomial name
- Ctenomys saltarius Thomas, 1912

Species of rodent

The Salta tuco-tuco (Ctenomys saltarius) is a species of rodent in the family Ctenomyidae. It is endemic to Argentina and Bolivia.
