= Argentine tuco-tuco =

Conservation status
- Near Threatened (IUCN 3.1)

Scientific classification
- Kingdom: Animalia
- Phylum: Chordata
- Class: Mammalia
- Order: Rodentia
- Family: Ctenomyidae
- Genus: Ctenomys
- Species: C. argentinus

Binomial name
- Ctenomys argentinus Contreras & Berry, 1982

Species of rodent

The Argentine tuco-tuco (Ctenomys argentinus) is a species of rodent in the family Ctenomyidae. It is endemic to Argentina.
