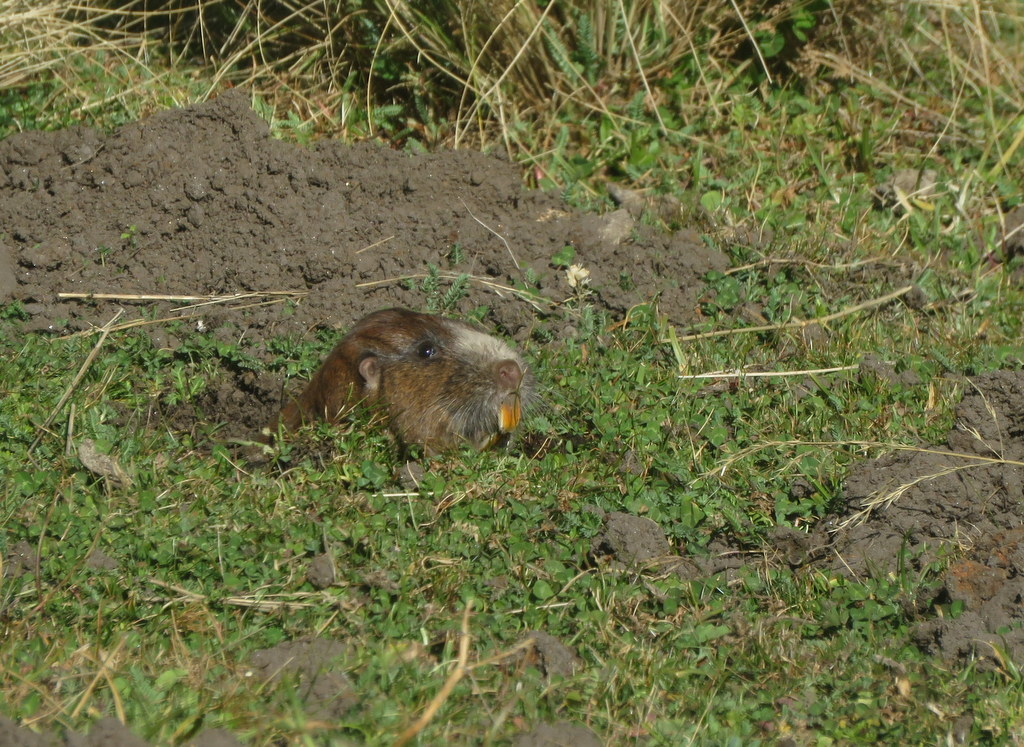

Conservation status
- Data Deficient (IUCN 3.1)

Scientific classification
- Kingdom: Animalia
- Phylum: Chordata
- Class: Mammalia
- Order: Rodentia
- Family: Ctenomyidae
- Genus: Ctenomys
- Species: C. tuconax

Binomial name
- Ctenomys tuconax Thomas, 1925

= Robust tuco-tuco =

Species of rodent

The robust tuco-tuco (Ctenomys tuconax) is a species of rodent in the family Ctenomyidae. It is a burrowing rodent and is endemic to the Tucumán Province of Argentina.

== Description ==
The robust tuco-tuco is a large species of tuco-tuco and grows to a total length of about 255 mm (10 in) including a tail of about 77 mm (3 in). As is the case with other members of the genus, the eyes and ears are small, the fur is dense and the claws on the forefeet are large. The fur is brown and it has a blackish stripe running along its spine. The underparts are yellowish-brown and the tail pale brown. The feet are clad in sparse whitish hairs.

Its karyotype has 2n = 58-61 and FN = 80.

== Distribution ==
This tuco-tuco is endemic to Tucumán Province in northwestern Argentina where it lives at altitudes of up to 3,000 m (9,800 ft). Its exact range is unclear but there seem to be two separate populations. It inhabits damp plains, making its burrows in well-compacted, humus-rich or loamy soils.

== Behaviour ==
Tuco-tucos get their common name from the calls they make, either issued from the entrance to the burrow or from underground. They have complex burrows with many tunnels and several food storage chambers as well as a nesting chamber. They are solitary creatures and feed on roots and grasses.

== Status ==
The conservation status of C. tuconax is listed as "data deficient" by the International Union for Conservation of Nature because the animal is poorly known. It is said to be common in the northern part of its range but is threatened by the destruction of its habitat for agricultural development. Its population trend is unknown, but it is recorded on the Argentine Red List as a "vulnerable species".
