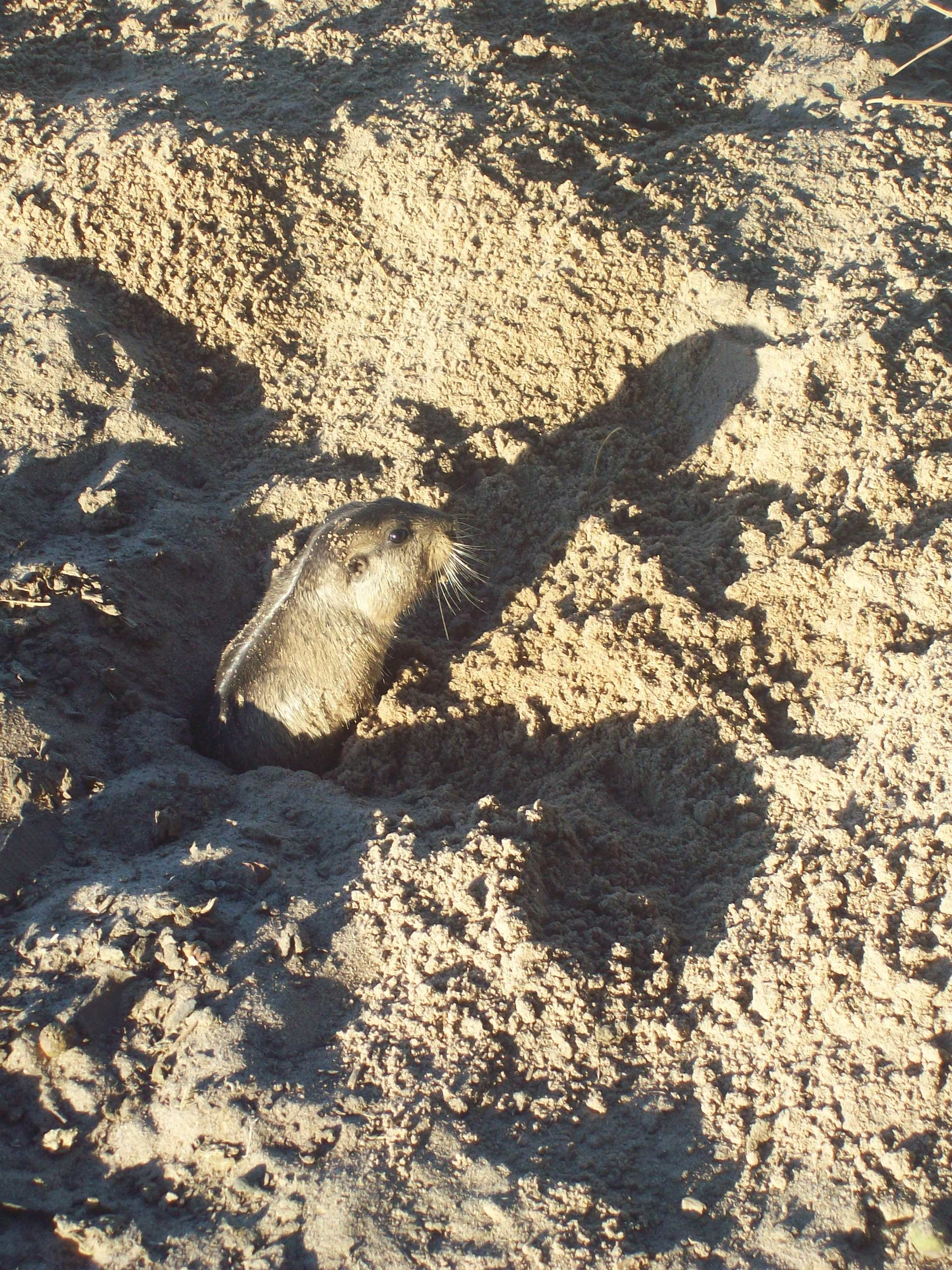

Conservation status
- Endangered (IUCN 3.1)

Scientific classification
- Kingdom: Animalia
- Phylum: Chordata
- Class: Mammalia
- Order: Rodentia
- Family: Ctenomyidae
- Genus: Ctenomys
- Species: C. pundti

Binomial name
- Ctenomys pundti Nehring, 1900

= Pundt's tuco-tuco =

Species of rodent

Pundt's tuco-tuco (Ctenomys pundti) is a species of rodent in the family Ctenomyidae. It is endemic to the Pampas of southern Córdoba and San Luis Provinces in central Argentina. The species is named after Argentine landowner and collector Moritz Pundt. It has a fragmented population and is threatened by conversion of its habitat to agricultural use.
