= Berg's tuco-tuco =

Conservation status
- Endangered (IUCN 3.1)

Scientific classification
- Kingdom: Animalia
- Phylum: Chordata
- Class: Mammalia
- Order: Rodentia
- Family: Ctenomyidae
- Genus: Ctenomys
- Species: C. bergi

Binomial name
- Ctenomys bergi Thomas, 1902

Species of rodent

Berg's tuco-tuco (Ctenomys bergi) is a species of rodent in the family Ctenomyidae, named after the Latvian-Argentine biologist Frederico Guillermo Carlos Berg. It is endemic to northwestern Córdoba Province in central Argentina. Its habitat is grassy areas overlying sand dunes. The species is threatened by the degradation and severe fragmentation of its small habitat.
