= Erika's tuco-tuco =

Scientific classification
- Kingdom: Animalia
- Phylum: Chordata
- Class: Mammalia
- Order: Rodentia
- Family: Ctenomyidae
- Genus: Ctenomys
- Species: C. erikacuellarae

Binomial name
- Ctenomys erikacuellarae Gardner, Salazar-Bravo, & Cook, 2014

Species of rodent

Erika's tuco-tuco (Ctenomys erikacuellarae), is a species of tuco-tuco native to Bolivia. Found only in the Cordillera Oriental mountain ranges in the Santa Cruz and Chuquisaca Departments, at elevations of around 810 to 1,800 metres (2,660 to 5,910 ft), the species measures around 287 millimetres (11 1/3 in) in length and has soft brown and ochraceous orange hair. It was named after Erika Cuéllar, a conservation biologist from Bolivia.

The holotype is held at the Museum of Southwestern Biology at the University of New Mexico MSB:Mamm:63391
