= Ctenomys andersoni =

Anderson's cujuchi

Scientific classification
- Kingdom: Animalia
- Phylum: Chordata
- Class: Mammalia
- Order: Rodentia
- Family: Ctenomyidae
- Genus: Ctenomys
- Species: C. andersoni

Binomial name
- Ctenomys andersoni Gardner, Salazar-Bravo, & Cook, 2014

Species of rodent

Ctenomys andersoni, also called Anderson's cujuchi, is a species of tuco-tuco native to Bolivia. Found only in Cerro Itahuaticua, Department of Santa Cruz, at an elevation of around 810 metres (2,700 ft), the species measures 271 millimetres (10 3/4 in) in length and has coarse brown and grey hair. It was named after Sydney Anderson, curator of the Department of Mammalogy at the American Museum of Natural History.
