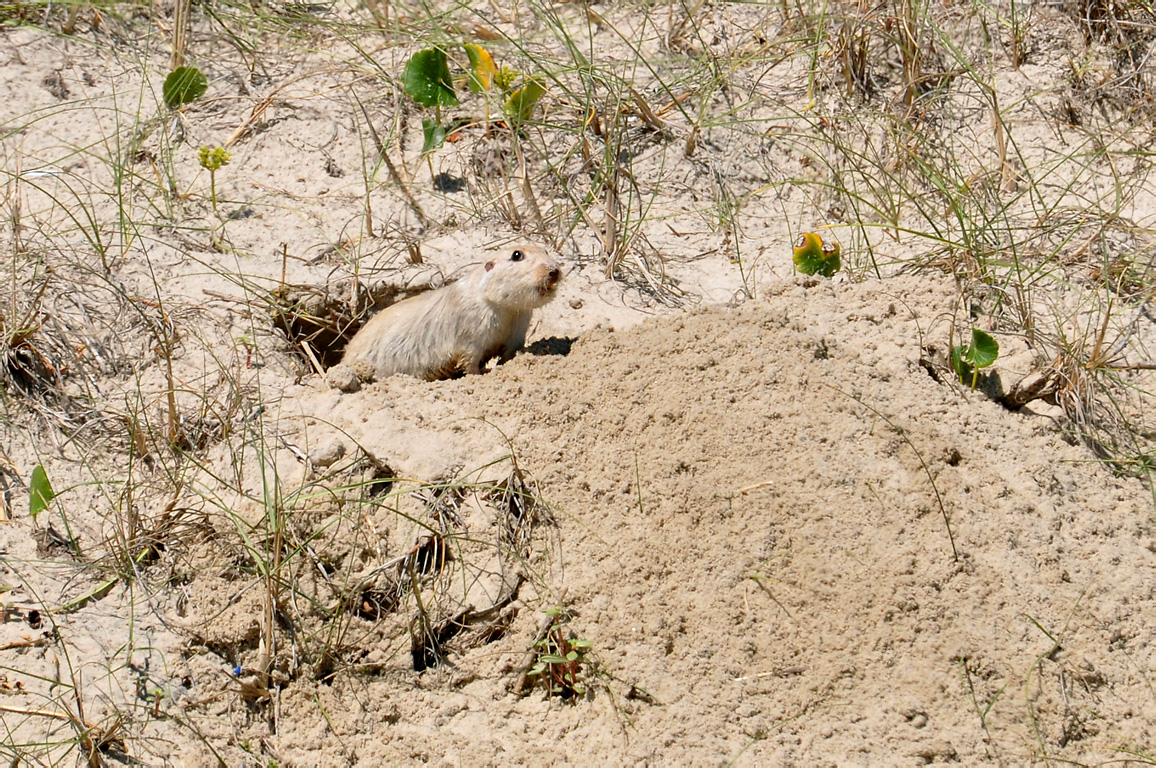

Conservation status
- Endangered (IUCN 3.1)

Scientific classification
- Kingdom: Animalia
- Phylum: Chordata
- Class: Mammalia
- Order: Rodentia
- Family: Ctenomyidae
- Genus: Ctenomys
- Species: C. flamarioni

Binomial name
- Ctenomys flamarioni Travi, 1981
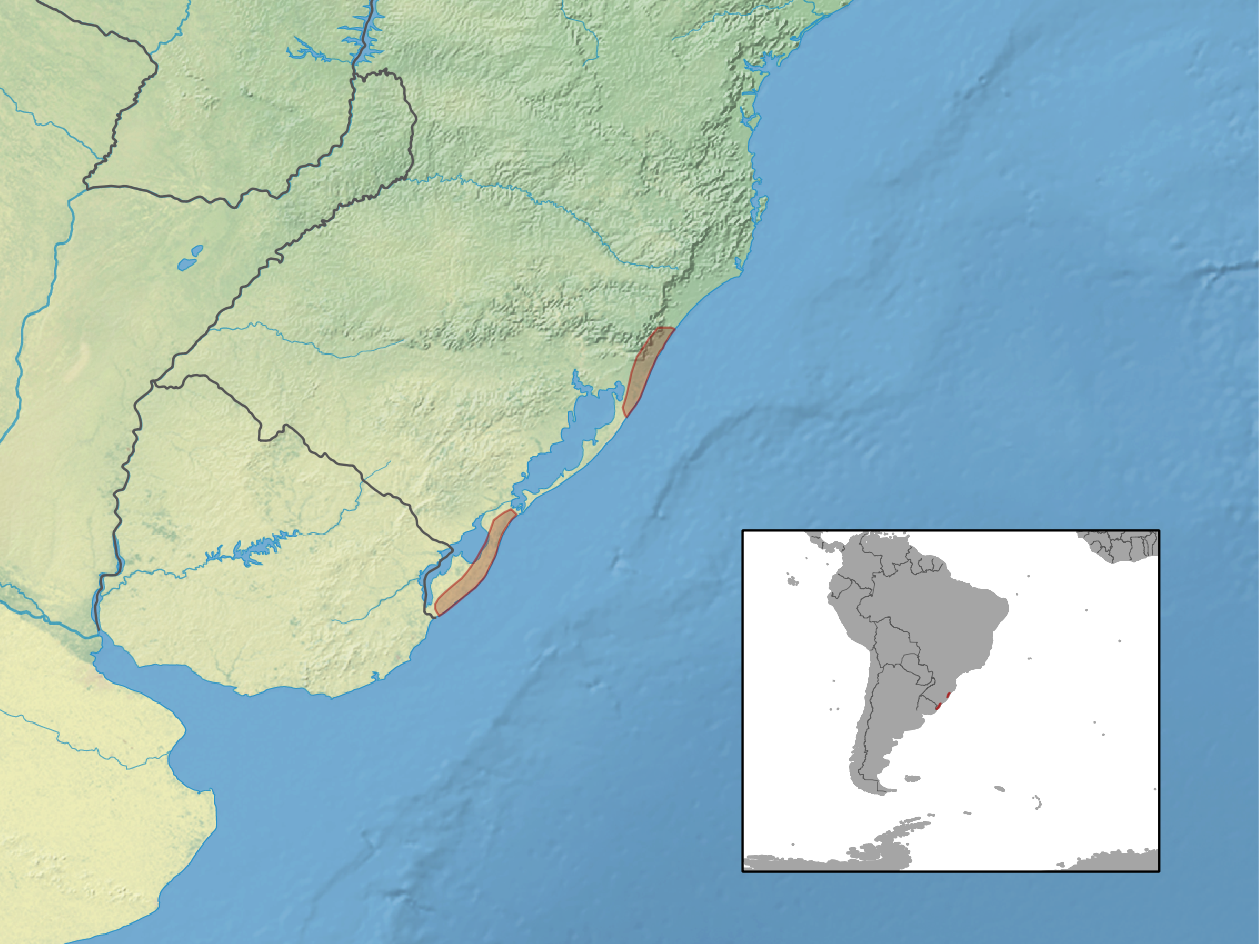

= Flamarion's tuco-tuco =

Ctenomys flamarioni

Species of rodent

Flamarion's tuco-tuco or the tuco-tuco of the dunes (Ctenomys flamarioni) is a rodent species of the family Ctenomyidae Its karyotype has 2n = 48 and FN = 50–78. It is endemic to the coastal dunes of Rio Grande do Sul state, southern Brazil. The species is threatened by habitat loss due to dune removal and urbanization. It is named after Brazilian biologist Luiz Flamarion B. de Oliveira.

== Distribution ==
Flamarion's tuco-tuco is an endemic species of the state of Rio Grande do Sul. It inhabits the first line of dunes on the coastal plain of the state, and its distribution extends from Arroio Teixeira beach in Capão da Canoa, on the northern coast, to Chuí, on the border with Uruguay, on the southern coast.

== Description ==
The species has a light coloration and is morphologically more robust than other tuco-tuco species in southern Brazil. This is directly related to the environment the species inhabits, as the coastal dunes have looser, more aerated soil. The dune tuco-tuco is subterranean and solitary, with only one individual per tunnel system.

In general, these small rodents live in their underground tunnels and it is not very common for them to leave their homes. They only leave their burrows to feed, clean the den, or remove excess sand.

== Conservation ==
The dune tuco-tuco is one of the most endangered species of the genus, and due to its restricted distribution in the coastal dune environment, it is listed as endangered (EN) by the IUCN Red List of Threatened Species (IUCN 2010). Its habitat is constantly changing due to the action of winds and tides, or the advancement of human occupation. The populations of this species have been increasingly impacted by continuous changes in their habitat, particularly in the northern coast of Rio Grande do Sul. The main threat is the removal of the first line of dunes, a practice aimed at urbanization and real estate speculation along the coast, which results in the degradation of this environment. In addition to human impacts on the dunes, such as trampling and litter deposition, the presence of domestic species, forestry (planting of Pinus species), and monocultures may also threaten the species' survival in the area.
