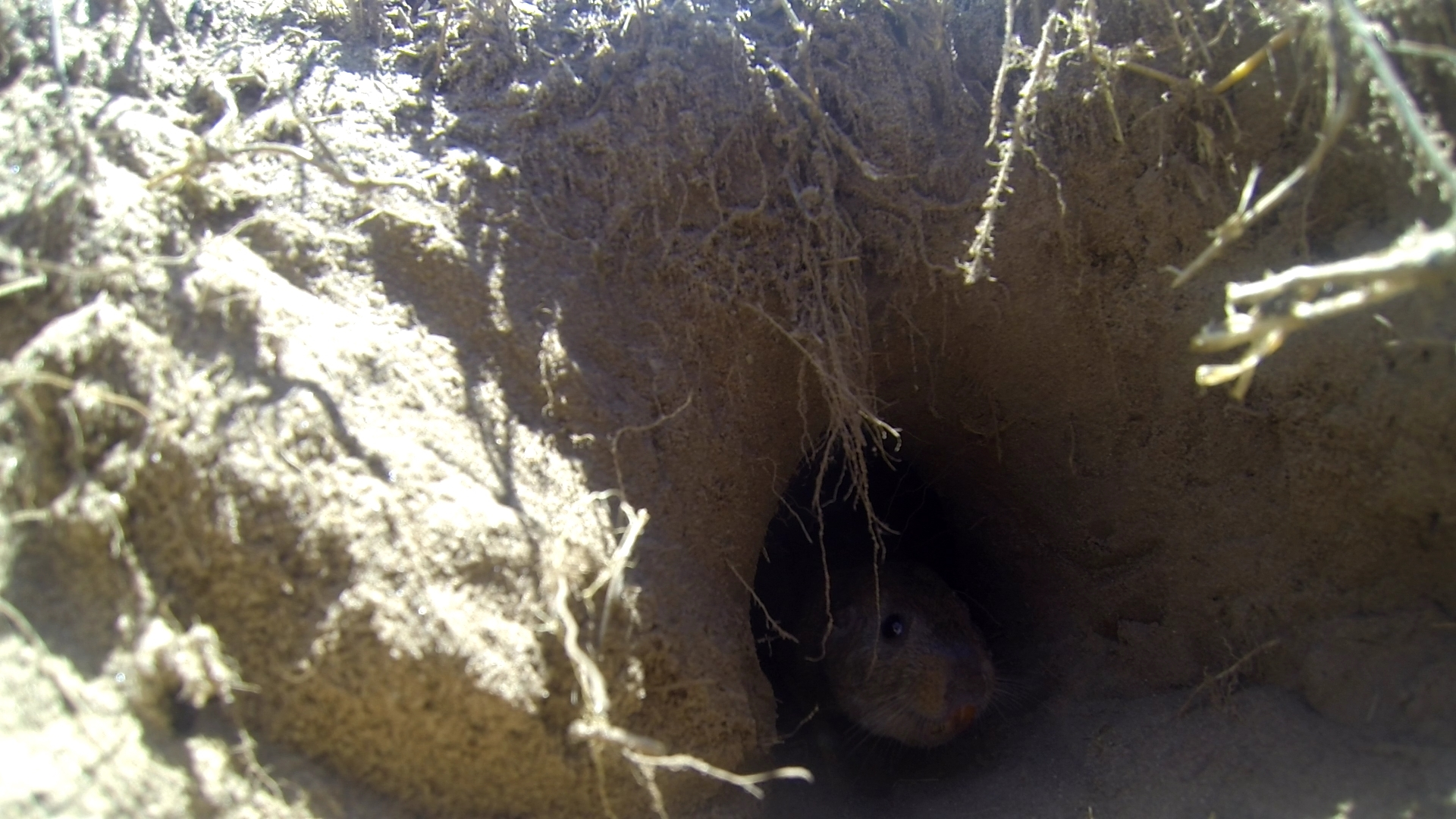
- A Río Negro tuco-tuco in Entre Ríos province, Argentina

Conservation status
- Endangered (IUCN 3.1)

Scientific classification
- Kingdom: Animalia
- Phylum: Chordata
- Class: Mammalia
- Order: Rodentia
- Family: Ctenomyidae
- Genus: Ctenomys
- Species: C. rionegrensis

Binomial name
- Ctenomys rionegrensis Langguth & Abella, 1970

= Rio Negro tuco-tuco =

Species of rodent

The Rio Negro tuco-tuco (Ctenomys rionegrensis) is a species of rodent in the family Ctenomyidae. It is found in a small fragmented range in Entre Ríos Province in northeastern Argentina and in the Río Negro Department of western Uruguay. It is restricted to sand dunes, and is threatened by the conversion of this habitat to forestry plantations.
