= Furtive tuco-tuco =

Conservation status
- Endangered (IUCN 3.1)

Scientific classification
- Kingdom: Animalia
- Phylum: Chordata
- Class: Mammalia
- Order: Rodentia
- Family: Ctenomyidae
- Genus: Ctenomys
- Species: C. occultus

Binomial name
- Ctenomys occultus Thomas, 1920

Species of rodent

The furtive tuco-tuco (Ctenomys occultus) is a species of rodent in the family Ctenomyidae. It is endemic to Argentina.
