= Steinbach's tuco-tuco =

Conservation status
- Least Concern (IUCN 3.1)

Scientific classification
- Kingdom: Animalia
- Phylum: Chordata
- Class: Mammalia
- Order: Rodentia
- Family: Ctenomyidae
- Genus: Ctenomys
- Species: C. steinbachi

Binomial name
- Ctenomys steinbachi Thomas, 1907

Species of rodent

Steinbach's tuco-tuco (Ctenomys steinbachi) is a species of rodent in the family Ctenomyidae. It is endemic to Bolivia. The species is named after zoological collector Dr. José Steinbach (1856–1929).
