= Bolivian tuco-tuco =

Conservation status
- Least Concern (IUCN 3.1)

Scientific classification
- Kingdom: Animalia
- Phylum: Chordata
- Class: Mammalia
- Order: Rodentia
- Family: Ctenomyidae
- Genus: Ctenomys
- Species: C. boliviensis

Binomial name
- Ctenomys boliviensis Waterhouse, 1848

Species of rodent

The Bolivian tuco-tuco (Ctenomys boliviensis) is a species of rodent in the family Ctenomyidae. It is found in Brazil, Paraguay, Argentina, and Bolivia.
