= Sierra Tontal tuco-tuco =

Conservation status
- Data Deficient (IUCN 3.1)

Scientific classification
- Kingdom: Animalia
- Phylum: Chordata
- Class: Mammalia
- Order: Rodentia
- Family: Ctenomyidae
- Genus: Ctenomys
- Species: C. tulduco

Binomial name
- Ctenomys tulduco Thomas, 1921

Species of rodent

The Sierra Tontal tuco-tuco (Ctenomys tulduco) is a species of rodent in the family Ctenomyidae. It is known only from a small locality in the Sierra del Tontal, San Juan Province, west central Argentina.
