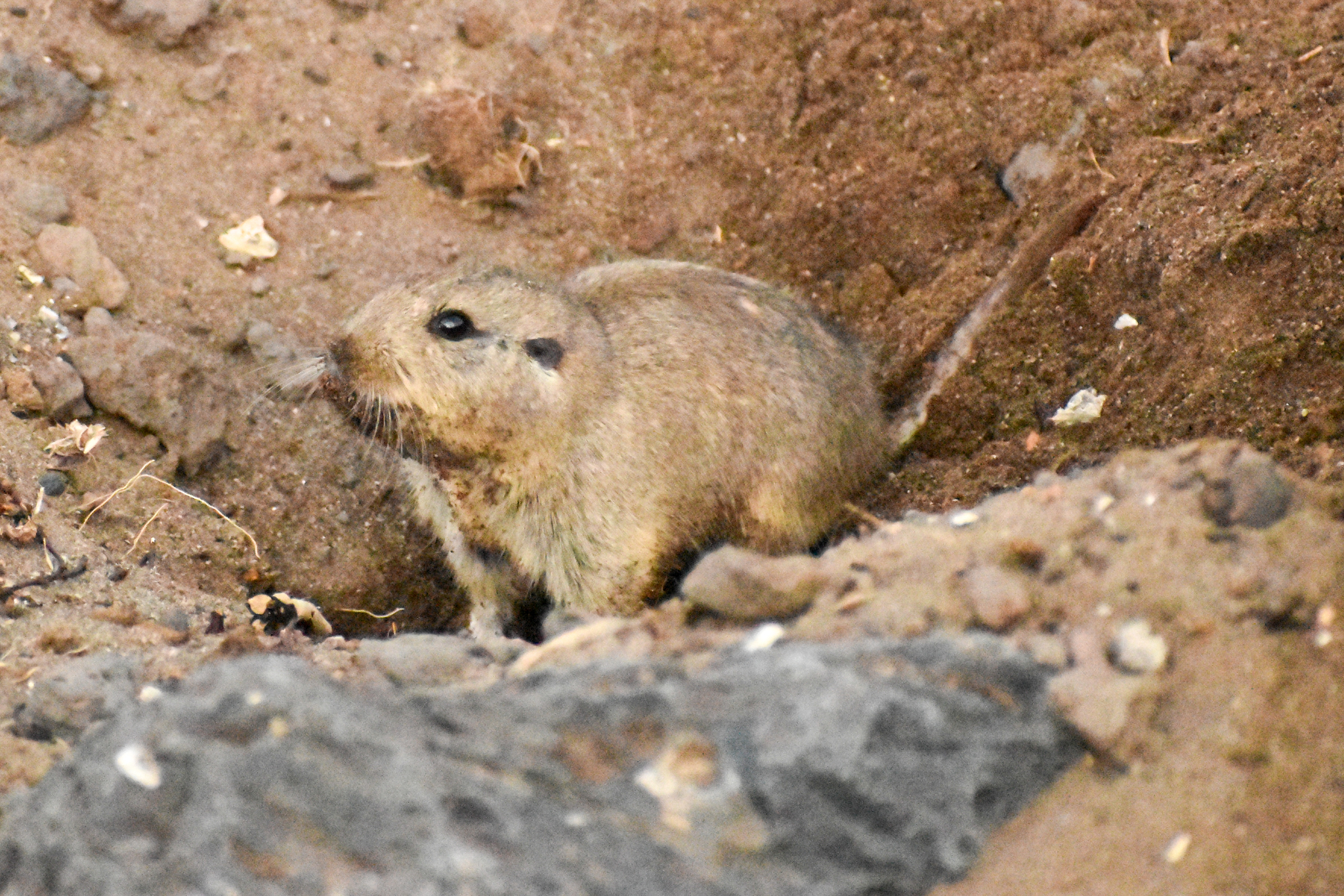

Conservation status
- Data Deficient (IUCN 3.1)

Scientific classification
- Kingdom: Animalia
- Phylum: Chordata
- Class: Mammalia
- Order: Rodentia
- Family: Ctenomyidae
- Genus: Ctenomys
- Species: C. colburni

Binomial name
- Ctenomys colburni J.A. Allen, 1903

= Colburn's tuco-tuco =

Species of rodent

Colburn's tuco-tuco (Ctenomys colburni) is a species of rodent in the family Ctenomyidae. Its only known habitat is in Argentina.
