= San Juan tuco-tuco =

Conservation status
- Data Deficient (IUCN 3.1)

Scientific classification
- Kingdom: Animalia
- Phylum: Chordata
- Class: Mammalia
- Order: Rodentia
- Family: Ctenomyidae
- Genus: Ctenomys
- Species: C. johannis

Binomial name
- Ctenomys johannis Thomas, 1921

Species of rodent

The San Juan tuco-tuco (Ctenomys johannis) is a species of rodent in the family Ctenomyidae. It is endemic to west central Argentina, where it is known only from southern San Juan Province.
