= Mottled tuco-tuco =

Conservation status
- Endangered (IUCN 3.1)

Scientific classification
- Kingdom: Animalia
- Phylum: Chordata
- Class: Mammalia
- Order: Rodentia
- Family: Ctenomyidae
- Genus: Ctenomys
- Species: C. latro

Binomial name
- Ctenomys latro Thomas, 1918

Species of rodent

The mottled tuco-tuco (Ctenomys latro) is a species of rodent in the family Ctenomyidae. It is endemic to Argentina, Chile and Uruguay. Its natural habitat is subtropical or tropical dry lowland grassland.
