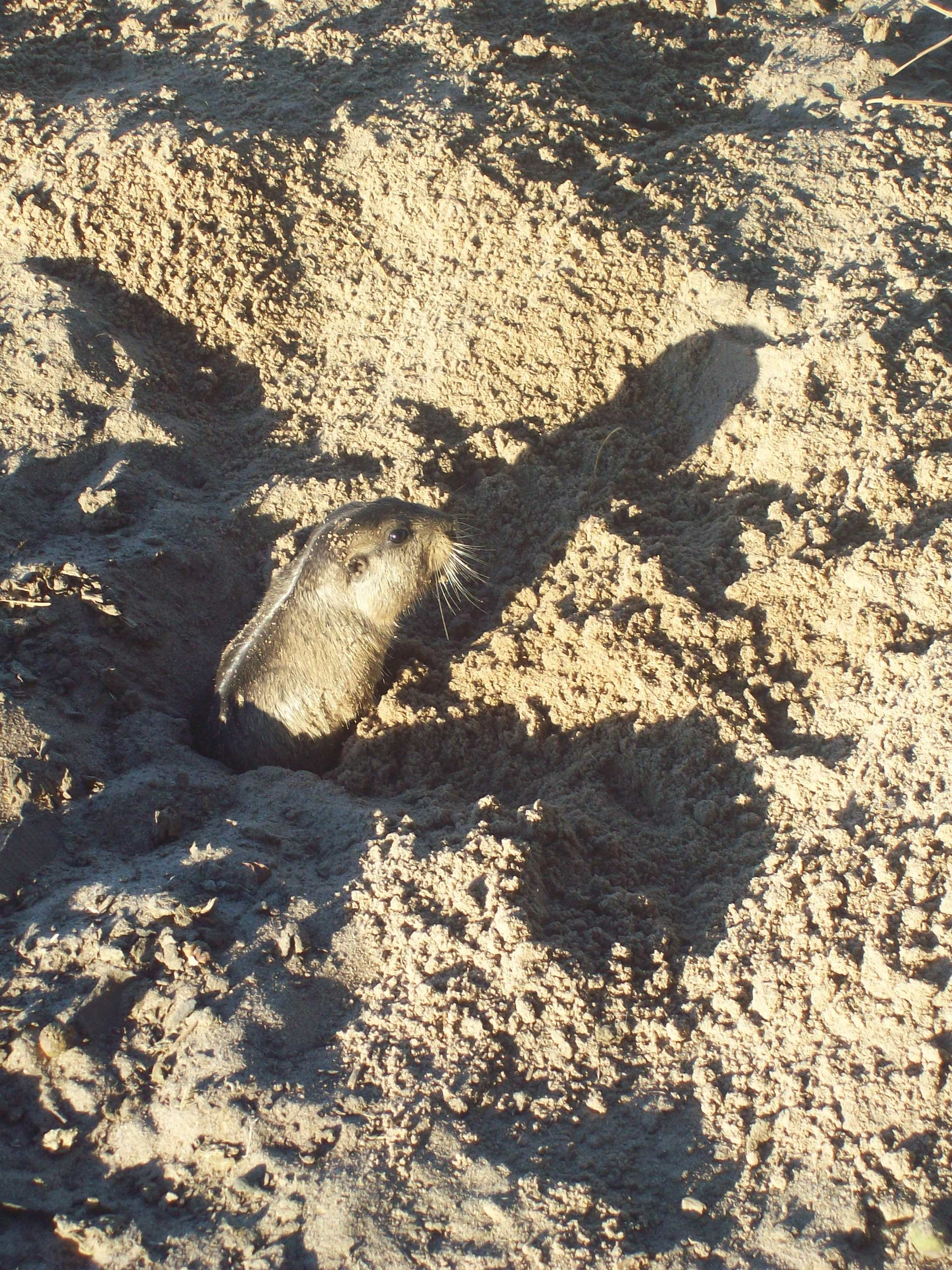

Conservation status
- Least Concern (IUCN 3.1)

Scientific classification
- Kingdom: Animalia
- Phylum: Chordata
- Class: Mammalia
- Order: Rodentia
- Family: Ctenomyidae
- Genus: Ctenomys
- Species: C. lewisi

Binomial name
- Ctenomys lewisi Thomas, 1926

= Lewis's tuco-tuco =

Species of rodent

Lewis's tuco-tuco (Ctenomys lewisi) is a species of rodent in the family Ctenomyidae. It is endemic to Bolivia.
