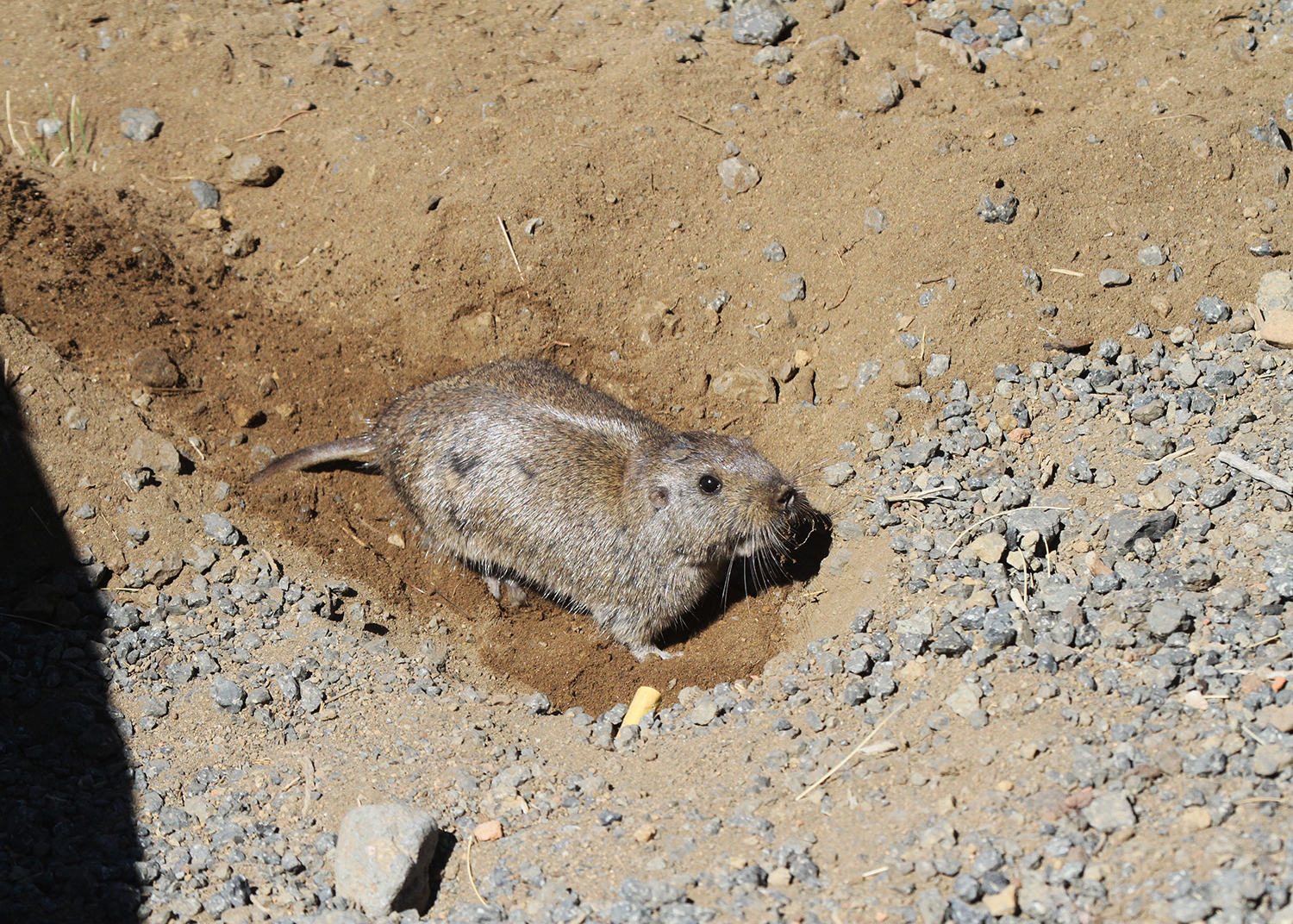

Conservation status
- Least Concern (IUCN 3.1)

Scientific classification
- Kingdom: Animalia
- Phylum: Chordata
- Class: Mammalia
- Order: Rodentia
- Family: Ctenomyidae
- Genus: Ctenomys
- Species: C. emilianus

Binomial name
- Ctenomys emilianus Thomas & St. Leger, 1926

= Emily's tuco-tuco =

Species of rodent

Emily's tuco-tuco (Ctenomys emilianus), also called Emilio's tuco-tuco, is a species of rodent in the family Ctenomyidae. It is endemic to Argentina. This species was named after Emilio Budin, an Argentine specimen collector who worked with Oldfield Thomas.

== Description ==
Emily's tuco-tuco grows to a total length of 264 to 302 mm (10.4 to 11.9 in) including a tail of 75 to 93 mm (3.0 to 3.7 in). The coat is a uniform, glossy fawn or pale greyish-brown, often with an almost pink cast, and no black markings. The flanks and underparts are whitish, and this colouring extends onto the thighs and hips, contrasting with the much browner colour of the rump. The feet and tail are whitish and there is hardly any black in the crest on the tail.

== Distribution and habitat ==
Emily's tuco-tuco is endemic to west central Argentina where it is present as several separate populations in the Province of Neuquén. Its habitat is areas of sand dunes at altitudes of about 800 m (2,600 ft).
