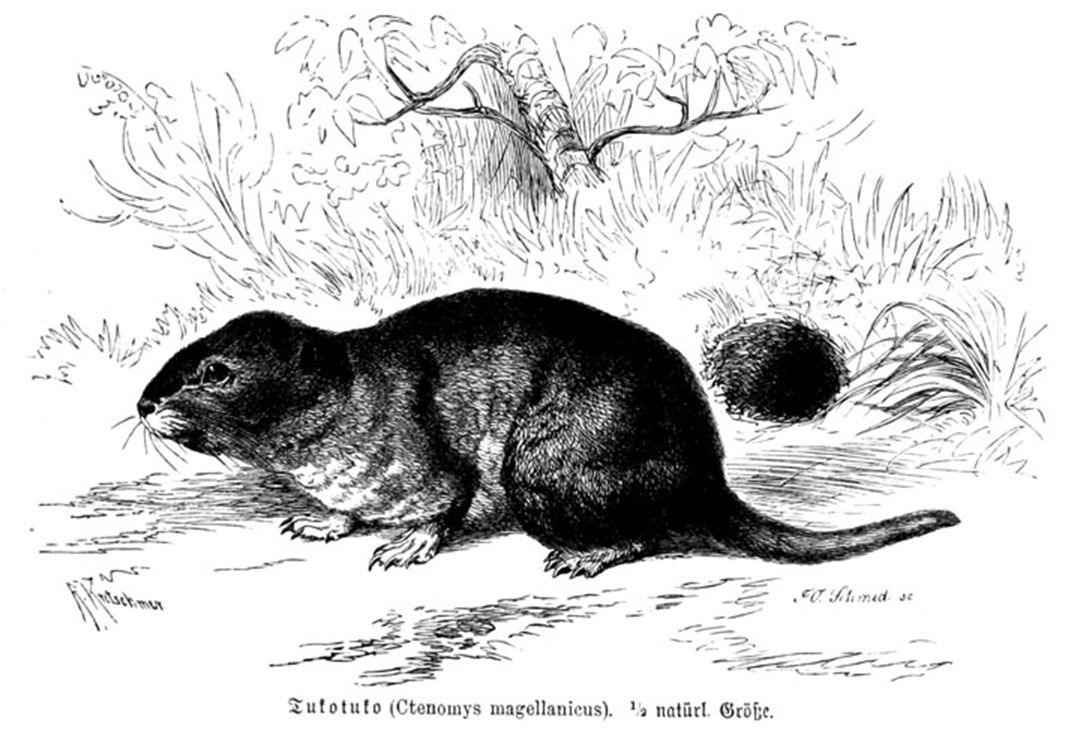

Conservation status
- Least Concern (IUCN 3.1)

Scientific classification
- Kingdom: Animalia
- Phylum: Chordata
- Class: Mammalia
- Order: Rodentia
- Family: Ctenomyidae
- Genus: Ctenomys
- Species: C. magellanicus

Binomial name
- Ctenomys magellanicus Bennett, 1836

Subspecies
- C. m. dicki Osgood, 1943; C. m. fueginus Philippi, 1880; C. m. magellanicus Bennett, 1836; C. m. osgoodi Allen, 1905

= Magellanic tuco-tuco =

Species of rodent

The Magellanic tuco-tuco (Ctenomys magellanicus) is a species of rodent in the family Ctenomyidae. It is found in Argentina and Chile. Its natural habitat is subtropical or tropical dry lowland grassland. It is also known as the cururo by the Selkʼnam culture of Tierra del Fuego.
