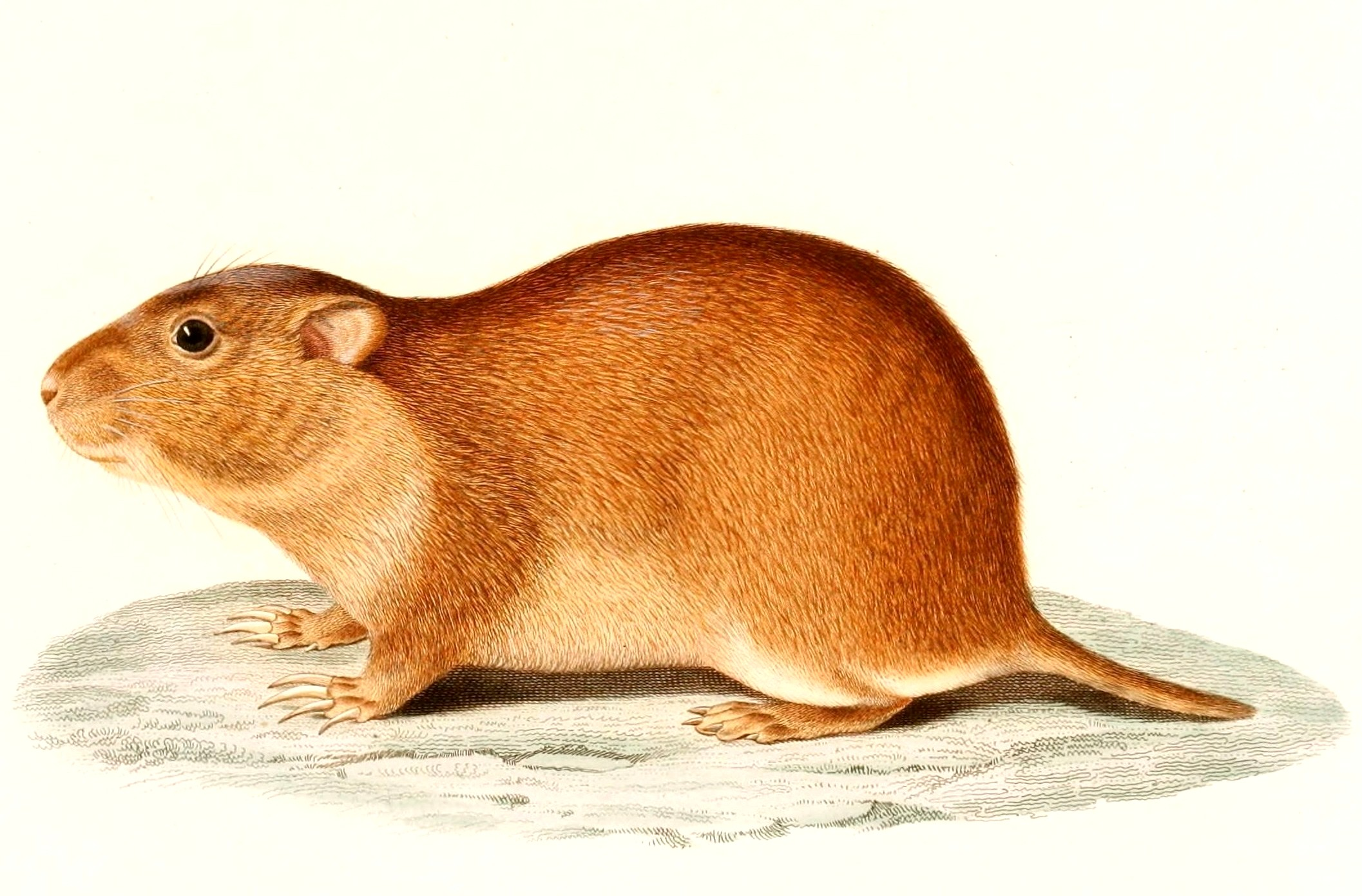

Conservation status
- Data Deficient (IUCN 3.1)

Scientific classification
- Domain: Eukaryota
- Kingdom: Animalia
- Phylum: Chordata
- Class: Mammalia
- Order: Rodentia
- Family: Ctenomyidae
- Genus: Ctenomys
- Species: C. brasiliensis

Binomial name
- Ctenomys brasiliensis Blainville, 1826

= Brazilian tuco-tuco =

Species of rodent

The Brazilian tuco-tuco (Ctenomys brasiliensis) is a tuco-tuco species. It is found mainly in the state of Minas Gerais in southeastern Brazil, though Charles Darwin mentions it during his trip through present-day Uruguay.

== Description ==
The Brazilian tuco-tuco has a reddish-brown coat color. The tail has short hairs covering it. It is the largest species of its genus. The head-body length is about 300 mm and the tail is relatively short.
