= Famatina tuco-tuco =

Conservation status
- Data Deficient (IUCN 3.1)

Scientific classification
- Kingdom: Animalia
- Phylum: Chordata
- Class: Mammalia
- Order: Rodentia
- Family: Ctenomyidae
- Genus: Ctenomys
- Species: C. famosus

Binomial name
- Ctenomys famosus Thomas, 1920

Species of rodent

The Famatina tuco-tuco (Ctenomys famosus) is a species of rodent in the family Ctenomyidae. It is endemic to northern Argentina. The common name of the species comes from the municipality, department and mountain range of the same name at the type locality.
