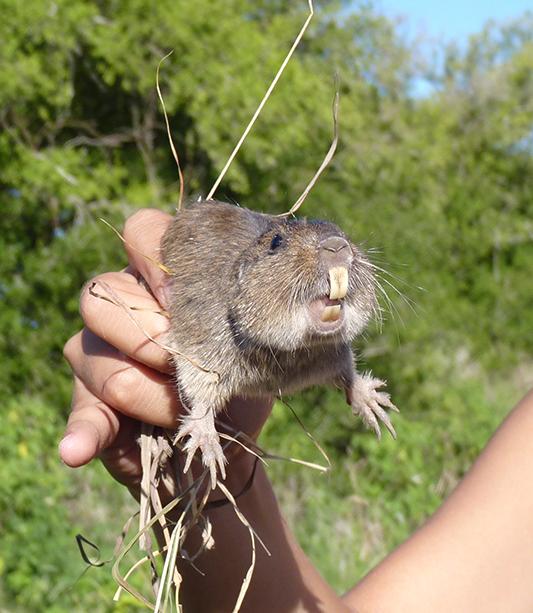

Conservation status
- Least Concern (IUCN 3.1)

Scientific classification
- Kingdom: Animalia
- Phylum: Chordata
- Class: Mammalia
- Order: Rodentia
- Family: Ctenomyidae
- Genus: Ctenomys
- Species: C. talarum

Binomial name
- Ctenomys talarum Thomas, 1898

Subspecies
- C. t. antonii Thomas, 1910; C. t. occidentalis Justo, 1992; C. t. recessus Thomas, 1912; C. t. talarum Thomas, 1898

= Talas tuco-tuco =

Species of rodent

The Talas tuco-tuco (Ctenomys talarum) is a species of tuco-tuco endemic to eastern Argentina.

== Description ==
The Talas tuco-tuco is a large rodent ranging in size from 212 to 254 mm (8.35 to 10.00 in), more than twice the size of a house mouse. Its tail length varies from 56 to 75 mm (2.20 to 2.95 in) and it weighs approximately 118 g (4.2 oz). The species shows significant sexual dimorphism. The Talas tuco-tuco basically has a cylindrically-shaped body, but is larger around the head and shoulders. It has short fine hair, which is normally a mix of hazel, gray and red on the back, and white on the underparts. It also has a distinct white patch on either side of the head, along the lower edge of its ears. Its eyes and ears are small compared to its headband it has very long, curved claws on all four feet.

== Distribution and habitat ==
The Talas tuco-tuco is subterranean, living in burrows. Only one inhabits a particular burrow at a time; however, some build extensive burrowing systems connecting individual burrows with tunnels. They prefer areas with loamy soil, grass, perennials plants and woody shrubs. In some cases, they can be found in sandy soils as well. They are usually found along the coasts of the Buenos Aires, La Pampa and Santa Fe provinces.

== Biology ==
Talas tuco-tucos are herbivorous, feeding on roots and grasses. Unlike most subterranean rodents, Talas tuco-tucos leave their burrows to forage for vegetation above ground.

Males can be sexually active throughout the year, but females have a much more restrictive breeding season, so that most pregnancies occur around August. An average litter consists of four offspring, with a slight about 1.63 females being born per male. The lactation period is estimated at about 45 days. In a study, one male was found to have copulated with all the females in the area.

Predators include the burrowing owl, short-eared owl, barn owl, and variable hawk. Lice that feed on the species include Eulinognathus americanus, Gyropus parvus, and Phtheropoios forficulatus. Trichostrongylids can be found in the small intestine, and trichurids in the caecum of the Talas tuco-tuco.

== Behavior ==
The Talas tuco-tuco is solitary, aggressive and territorial. They use scent recognition to distinguish between individuals. Males engage in one on one confrontations with other males for prospective mates, using their sharp incisors as weapons. These can also be used as digging tools, but they prefer to use their claws when building their burrows. Although they are subterranean, they spend much of their time above the ground, foraging for food.
