= Tawny tuco-tuco =

Conservation status
- Data Deficient (IUCN 3.1)

Scientific classification
- Kingdom: Animalia
- Phylum: Chordata
- Class: Mammalia
- Order: Rodentia
- Family: Ctenomyidae
- Genus: Ctenomys
- Species: C. fulvus

Binomial name
- Ctenomys fulvus Philippi, 1860

Subspecies
- C. f. fulvus Philippi, 1860; C. f. robustus Philippi, 1896

Species of rodent

The tawny tuco-tuco (Ctenomys fulvus) is a species of burrowing rodent in the family Ctenomyidae. It is found in the desert regions of northern Chile and adjoining areas of Argentina.

== Description ==
The tawny tuco-tuco grows to a length of 280 to 350 mm (11 to 14 in), and the subspecies C. f. robustus may grow even bigger. The forehead and the margins of the mouth are dark brown, otherwise the head and back are greyish brown and the flanks are rather paler brown. The underparts are a cinnamon-buff colour and the tail is brownish black, ending in a pale tuft of hairs. The upper surfaces of the feet are buffish white with some dark markings. The karyotype of both subspecies is 2n=26.

== Distribution and habitat ==
This species is native to Argentina and Chile. There are two separate populations; the nominate subspecies C. f. robustus occurs in the Antofagasta Region of Chile and adjoining parts of northwestern Argentina; the other subspecies C. f. fulvus occurs only in the Oasis de Pica in the Tarapacá Region of northern Chile. Four degrees of latitude separate these two areas. This tuco-tuco typically lives in flat areas of desert with sandy soils, creosote bushes (Larrea sp.), and scrub. It also inhabits ribbons of trees growing alongside dry watercourses and creeks.

== Ecology ==
Burrows in which to live are dug at least 25 cm (10 in) deep. The external temperature in these very dry regions can vary between 6 and 62 °C (43 and 144 °F) but in the depths of the burrow the temperature normally remains within the range 19 to 25 °C (66 to 77 °F). These rodents are mainly active in the early morning, especially in the dry season. Their diet includes Larrea leaves and roots. The animals derive most of their water requirements from their food, and the stable temperature in their burrows protects them from the lethal effects of overheating.

== Status ==
The population of C. fulvus has not been quantified but the animal has a wide range and is presumed to have a large total population. The International Union for Conservation of Nature has rated it as being of "least concern" on the basis that, if its population trend is downward, then the population is not declining at such a rate as would justify putting it in a more threatened category.
