= Terry Yates =

American biologist

Terry Lamon Yates (March 17, 1950 – December 11, 2007) was an American biologist and academic who is credited with discovering the source of the hantavirus in the American Southwest in 1993. Yates' specialty as a biologist was the study of rodents and other small mammals.

== Early life ==
Terry Yates was born in Mayfield, Kentucky. He earned his bachelor's degree from Murray State University before completing his master's degree in biology from Texas A&M in 1975. He later received his doctorate in biology from Texas Tech University in 1978.

== Hantavirus ==
Residents living in the Four Corners region, which encompasses parts of Arizona, Colorado, New Mexico and Utah, began to experience a mysterious illness in the spring of 1993. The then unknown virus killed 32 people in just a few weeks, and sickened many others. The illness was originally nicknamed "Sin Nombre," after a New Mexican canyon where Spanish settlers massacred Native Americans during the colonial era.

Terry Yates, a professor at the University of New Mexico, joined an interdisciplinary research team charged with finding the source of the mysterious illness by the National Science Foundation. Yates, along with his research assistant, Robert Parmenter, isolated the source of the illness, which became known as the hantavirus, by using animal specimens which he had collected throughout the American Southwest. Yates found that the hantavirus was carried by the deer mouse, a species which had a higher than usual population in early 1993 due to unusually wet weather in the region. The discovery of the hantavirus' origin by Yates has helped to save lives and warn residents about the risks of the disease. The virus has killed more than 125 people between 1993 and 2007.

Yates spent the later years of his life studying the connection between wet weather patterns and deer mice populations.

The National Science Foundation named Yates' discovery of the cause of the hantavirus as one of the top fifty projected funded by the NSF which had the greatest impact on peoples' lives.

== University of New Mexico ==
Yates was affiliated with the University of New Mexico for 29 years before his death in 2007. He served as a professor of biology and pathology, before becoming the UNM's vice president for research and economic development, a position he held until his death.

Additionally, Yates directed the National Science Foundation's Division of Environmental Biology from 1990 to 1992 and again from 2000 to 2001. In 2006, he was appointed to the board of directors on life sciences of the National Research Council of the National Academy of Sciences.

== Death ==
Yates lived in Placitas, New Mexico. He died of cancer on December 11, 2007, at the University of New Mexico Hospital in Albuquerque, New Mexico, at the age of 57.

In 2017, a recently discovered species of the Oligoryzomys genus (O. yatesi) was named after him as an homage for his "important contribution to the Chilean mammalogy research". In 2014, a new species of subterranean rodent from South America was named after Dr. Yates which is called Yates's tuco-tuco, Ctenomys yatesi Gardner et al., 2014
