= Catamarca tuco-tuco =

Conservation status
- Data Deficient (IUCN 3.1)

Scientific classification
- Kingdom: Animalia
- Phylum: Chordata
- Class: Mammalia
- Order: Rodentia
- Family: Ctenomyidae
- Genus: Ctenomys
- Species: C. knighti

Binomial name
- Ctenomys knighti Thomas, 1919

Species of rodent

The Catamarca tuco-tuco (Ctenomys knighti) is a species of rodent in the family Ctenomyidae. It is endemic to Argentina.
