= Social tuco-tuco =

Conservation status
- Critically Endangered (IUCN 3.1)

Scientific classification
- Kingdom: Animalia
- Phylum: Chordata
- Class: Mammalia
- Order: Rodentia
- Family: Ctenomyidae
- Genus: Ctenomys
- Species: C. sociabilis

Binomial name
- Ctenomys sociabilis Pearson & Christie, 1985

Species of rodent

The social tuco-tuco (Ctenomys sociabilis) is a species of rodent in the family Ctenomyidae. It is endemic to Argentina. Its natural habitat is subtropical or tropical dry lowland grassland.

== Range ==
The social tuco-tuco is found in the mesic meadows at about 1000 m in elevation. Its range is rather small at about 700 km^{2}, bound by the Rio Limay to the east, the Rio Traful to the north, and the Lago Nahuel Huapi to the south.

== Behavior ==
One of the unique characteristics of this species is its social behavior. This is evidenced by observed adult burrow sharing, female tendency to stay near her birthplace, and alloparental care. With this high degree of sociability, however, there seems to be much less genetic diversity.
