= La Puntilla, Belén =

Coordinates: 27°41′06″S 66°59′35″W

La Puntilla (Belén)
- Municipality and village
- Interactive map of La Puntilla (Belén)
- Country: Argentina
- Province: Catamarca Province
- Time zone: UTC−3 (ART)

La Puntilla (Belén) is a village and municipality in Belén Department, Catamarca Province in northwestern Argentina.
