= Oliver Payne Pearson =

American zoologist

Oliver P. Pearson
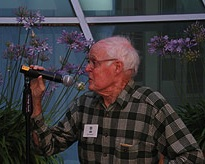
- June 2001
- Born: Oliver Payne Pearson; October 21, 1915; Philadelphia, Pennsylvania
- Died: March 4, 2003 (aged 87); Walnut Creek, California
- Education: Harvard University
- Known for: The rate of metabolism of some small mammals. Ecology 28:127-145 (1947).
- Awards: Hartley H. T. Jackson Award (1984), Honorary Doctoral Degree, University of La Plata (2000)
- Scientific career
- Fields: Mammalogy, Ecology
- Workplaces: UC Berkeley, Museum of Vertebrate Zoology
- Author abbrev. (zoology): Pearson

Oliver Payne Pearson (October 21, 1915, in Philadelphia, Pennsylvania – March 4, 2003, in Walnut Creek, California), or "Paynie" to many that knew him, was an American zoologist and ecologist. Over a very active 50-year career, he served as professor of zoology at UC Berkeley and curator of mammals at the Museum of Vertebrate Zoology. Pearson is best known for his work on the role of predation on vole demography and population cycles, and for his piercing contributions to the biology of South American mammals, but his earlier studies on reproductive and physiological ecology are highly regarded as well.

== Background ==
Pearson graduated from Swarthmore College in 1937. He attended Harvard University for both his M.S. (1939) and Ph.D. (1947), and was then hired by UC Berkeley as an instructor in zoology (1947–48). He was an assistant professor of zoology (Department of Zoology) and assistant curator of mammals (Museum of Vertebrate Zoology, MVZ) from 1949 to 1955, gaining tenure and advancing to associate professor of zoology and associate curator of mammals in the MVZ in 1955. In 1957 he resigned his tenured position, maintaining status at UC Berkeley as a lecturer in zoology and as a research associate at the museum. This allowed him to focus his attentions on his studies of voles and predation, and to spend a year as a visiting professor of ecology at the University of Buenos Aires (1964–65). When Alden Miller, director of the MVZ, died in 1965, Pearson returned to the tenure series, this time as full professor of zoology (which he retained until his real and very active retirement in 1971), and as acting director of the MVZ (1966–67) and then director (1967–71).

== South America ==
In 1937 he traveled to Panama, then to Peru (1938, 1939–40, 1946, 1952, 1955, 1967, 1972), Colombia (1950) and Argentina (1955, 1964–65, and yearly from 1978 to 1999). He was honorary member of the American Society of Mammalogists (ASM), Cooper Ornithological Society (COS), Sociedad Argentina para el Estudio de los Mamíferos (SAREM) and the Comité Argentino de Conservación de la Naturaleza. He was an elected director for the ASM over 17 years between 1952 and 1990 and received the Hartley H. T. Jackson Award "for long and outstanding service to ASM" in 1984. After his death in 2003, the ASM established the Oliver Pearson Award, which offers financial support to young professional mammalogists who hold academic or curatorial positions in Latin America, to help them establish or consolidate their research programs.

== Marriage ==
In 1944 he married Anita Kelley, who was to be his companion in all his subsequent travels, with whom he had four children. When awarded an honorary doctoral degree ("Doctor Honoris Causa") from the University of La Plata, Argentina in 2000, Pearson famously stated "Yo soy un simple atrapador de ratones, y nada hubiese sido posible sin Anita" ("I am a simple mouse-trapper, and nothing would have been possible without Anita").

== Recognitions ==
Three rodent taxa were named after him: the species Ctenomys pearsoni (Lessa & Langguth, 1983) and Andalgalomys pearsoni (Myers, 1977), in addition to the genus Pearsonomys Patterson, 1992.

== Selected publications ==
- Pearson, O. P. (1944). "Reproduction in the shrew (Blarina brevicauda Say)". American Journal of Anatomy. 75: 39–93. doi:10.1002/aja.1000750103.
- Pearson, O. P. (1947). "The rate of metabolism of some small mammals". Ecology. 28 (2): 127–145. doi:10.2307/1930947. JSTOR 1930947.
- Pearson, O. P. (1948). "Metabolism of Small Mammals, with Remarks on the Lower Limit of Mammalian Size". Science. 108 (2793): 44. Bibcode:1948Sci...108...44P. doi:10.1126/science.108.2793.44. PMID 17739234.
- Pearson, O. P.; Koford, M. R.; Pearson, A. K. (1952). "Reproduction of the lump-nosed bat (Corynorhinus rafinesquei) in California". Journal of Mammalogy. 33 (3): 273–320. doi:10.2307/1375769. JSTOR 1375769.
- Pearson, O. P. (1954). "Habits of the lizard Liolaemus multiformis multiformis at high altitudes in southern Peru". Copeia. 2 (2): 111–116. doi:10.2307/1440329. JSTOR 1440329.
- Pearson, O. P. (1963). "History of two local outbreaks of feral house mice". Ecology. 44 (3): 540–548. doi:10.2307/1932533. JSTOR 1932533.
- Pearson, O. P. (1966). "The prey of carnivores during one cycle of mouse abundance". Journal of Animal Ecology. 35 (1): 217–233. doi:10.2307/2698. JSTOR 2698.
- Pearson, O. P. (1971). "Additional measurements of the impact of carnivores on California voles (Microtus californicus)". Journal of Mammalogy. 52 (1): 41–49. doi:10.2307/1378430. JSTOR 1378430.
- Pearson, O. P.; Bradford, D. F. (1976). "Thermoregulation of lizards and toads at high altitudes in Peru". Copeia. 1976 (1): 155–170. doi:10.2307/1443786. JSTOR 1443786.
- Pearson, O. P.; Patton, J. L. (1976). "Relationships among South American phyllotine rodents based on chromosome analysis". Journal of Mammalogy. 57 (2): 339–350. doi:10.2307/1379693. JSTOR 1379693.
