= Foch's tuco-tuco =

Conservation status
- Data Deficient (IUCN 3.1)

Scientific classification
- Kingdom: Animalia
- Phylum: Chordata
- Class: Mammalia
- Order: Rodentia
- Family: Ctenomyidae
- Genus: Ctenomys
- Species: C. fochi

Binomial name
- Ctenomys fochi Thomas, 1919

Species of rodent

Foch's tuco-tuco (Ctenomys fochi) is a species of rodent in the family Ctenomyidae. It is endemic to northwestern Argentina, where it is known from southwestern Catamarca Province. The species is named after World War I general Ferdinand Foch.
