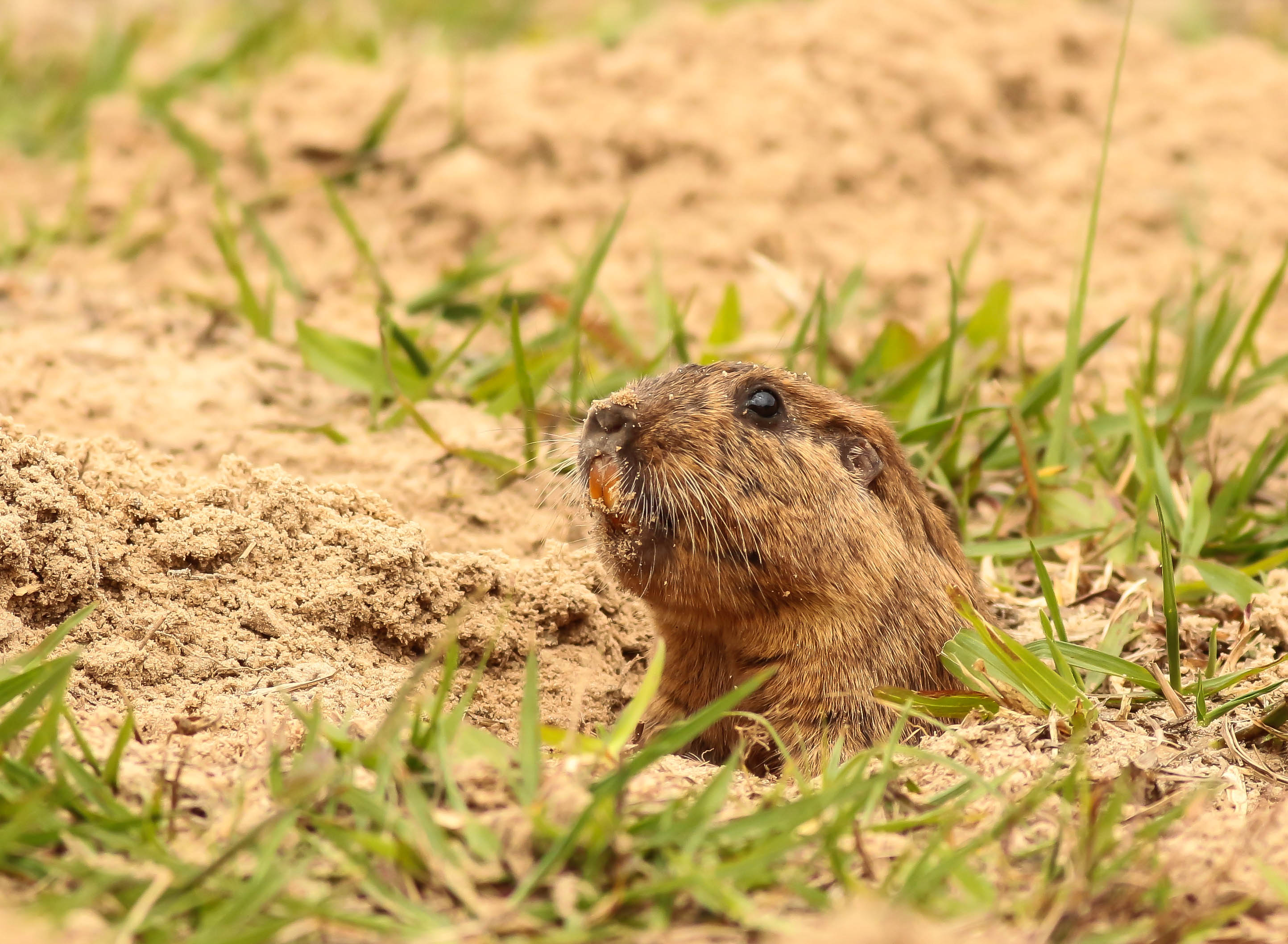

Conservation status
- Data Deficient (IUCN 3.1)

Scientific classification
- Domain: Eukaryota
- Kingdom: Animalia
- Phylum: Chordata
- Class: Mammalia
- Order: Rodentia
- Family: Ctenomyidae
- Genus: Ctenomys
- Species: C. minutus

Binomial name
- Ctenomys minutus Nehring, 1887

= Tiny tuco-tuco =

Species of rodent

The tiny tuco-tuco (Ctenomys minutus) is a tuco-tuco species found in Brazil and Bolivia.
