= Monodelphis pinocchio =

Scientific classification
- Kingdom: Animalia
- Phylum: Chordata
- Class: Mammalia
- Infraclass: Marsupialia
- Order: Didelphimorphia
- Family: Didelphidae
- Genus: Monodelphis
- Species: M. pinocchio

Binomial name
- Monodelphis pinocchio Pavan, 2015

Species of marsupial

Monodelphis pinocchio, also known as the long-nosed short-tailed opossum (not to be mistaken with Monodelphis scalops) is a species of mammal in the family Didelphidae. It is endemic to southeastern Brazil.

== Taxonomy ==
The specific epithet refers to the fictional doll Pinocchio from The Adventures of Pinocchio, alluding to the enlarged rostrum of this opossum, which resembles Pinocchios's elongated nose.

== Description ==
It is a small species of opossum. It is uniformly brown all over its body, with a pale gray belly.

== Distribution and habitat ==
It is found in the Atlantic Forest of southeastern Brazil, in the states of São Paulo, Rio de Janeiro, Minas Gerais, and Esperito Santo. It is restricted to montane habitats.
