= Hooded red-sided opossum =

Conservation status
- Least Concern (IUCN 3.1)

Scientific classification
- Kingdom: Animalia
- Phylum: Chordata
- Class: Mammalia
- Infraclass: Marsupialia
- Order: Didelphimorphia
- Family: Didelphidae
- Genus: Monodelphis
- Species: M. palliolata

Binomial name
- Monodelphis palliolata (Osgood, 1914)
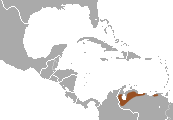
- Hooded red-sided opossum range

Species of marsupial

The hooded red-sided opossum (Monodelphis palliolata) is a South American opossum species of the family Didelphidae. Until recently, it was viewed as a subspecies of M. brevicaudata. It is found in Colombia and Venezuela at altitudes from sea level to 2250 m. It is a primarily nonarboreal resident of tropical rainforest, but has also been seen in areas under cultivation.
