= Peruvian short-tailed opossum =

Conservation status
- Least Concern (IUCN 3.1)

Scientific classification
- Kingdom: Animalia
- Phylum: Chordata
- Class: Mammalia
- Infraclass: Marsupialia
- Order: Didelphimorphia
- Family: Didelphidae
- Genus: Monodelphis
- Species: M. peruviana

Binomial name
- Monodelphis peruviana (Osgood, 1913)

Species of marsupial

The Peruvian short-tailed opossum (Monodelphis peruviana) is a species of marsupial in the family Didelphidae.It is found in Bolivia and Peru.

== Classification ==
This species was initially described as Peramys peruvianus by Wilfred H. Osgood in 1913. It was later placed in the genus Monodelphis and was included under the species M. adusta (sepia short-tailed opossum) by Cabrera (1958). S. Solari (2004), while comparing and revising diagnoses of specimens of the species M. adusta with Monodelphis ronaldi sp. nov., found that Monodelphis adusta peruvianus was differentiable from M. adusta; having a shorter head-body length but longer dorsal hair than M. adusta.
