= Pygmy opossum =

Pygmy opossum may refer to:

- Chacoan pygmy opossum (Chacodelphys formosa) from South America
- Pygmy short-tailed opossum (Monodelphis kunsi) from South America

== See also ==
- Pygmy possum, five living species of small marsupial in the family Burramyidae, from Australia and New Guinea
