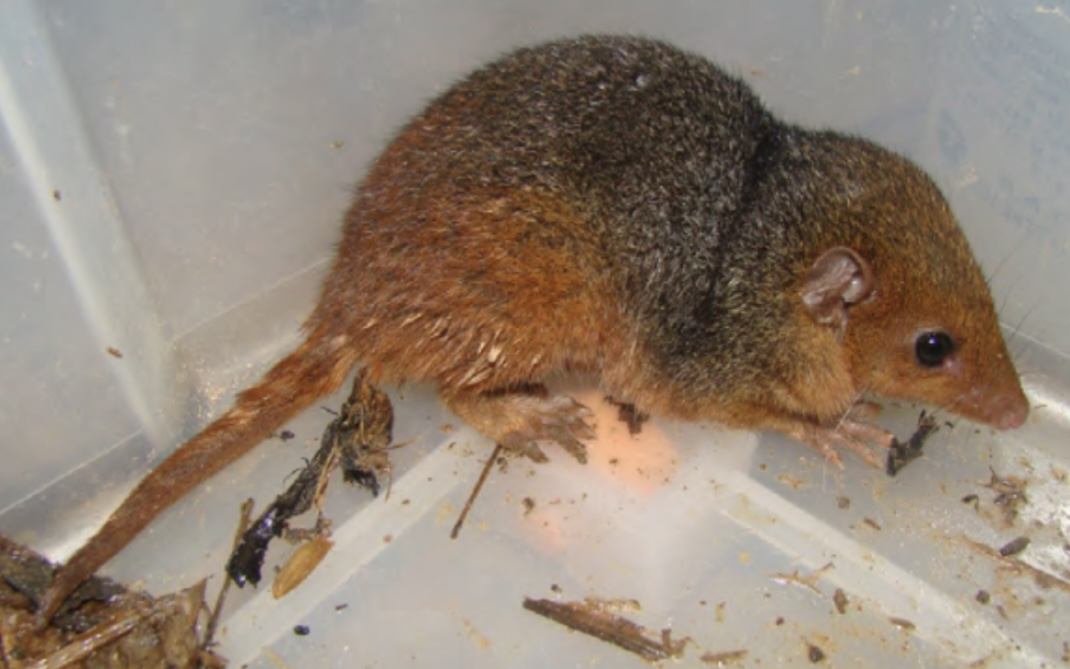

Conservation status
- Least Concern (IUCN 3.1)

Scientific classification
- Kingdom: Animalia
- Phylum: Chordata
- Class: Mammalia
- Infraclass: Marsupialia
- Order: Didelphimorphia
- Family: Didelphidae
- Genus: Monodelphis
- Species: M. emiliae

Binomial name
- Monodelphis emiliae (Thomas, 1912)
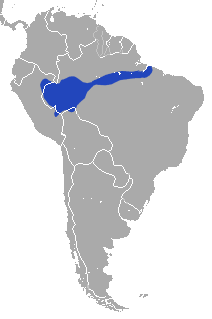
- Emilia's short-tailed opossum range

= Emilia's short-tailed opossum =

Species of marsupial

Emilia's short-tailed opossum (Monodelphis emiliae) is an opossum species from South America. It is found south of the Amazon River from eastern Peru, through Bolivia, to central Brazil.
