= Amazonian red-sided opossum =

Conservation status
- Least Concern (IUCN 3.1)

Scientific classification
- Kingdom: Animalia
- Phylum: Chordata
- Class: Mammalia
- Infraclass: Marsupialia
- Order: Didelphimorphia
- Family: Didelphidae
- Genus: Monodelphis
- Species: M. glirina

Binomial name
- Monodelphis glirina (Wagner, 1842)
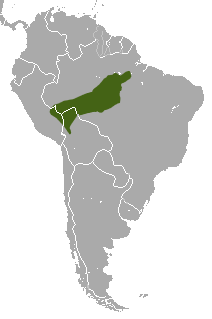
- Amazonian red-sided opossum range

Species of marsupial

The Amazonian red-sided opossum (Monodelphis glirina) is a species of opossum in the family Didelphidae, formerly viewed as part of M. brevicaudata. It is found in South America (Bolivia, Brazil and Peru), where it inhabits the Amazon rainforest. It is omnivorous, nocturnal, and primarily nonarboreal.
