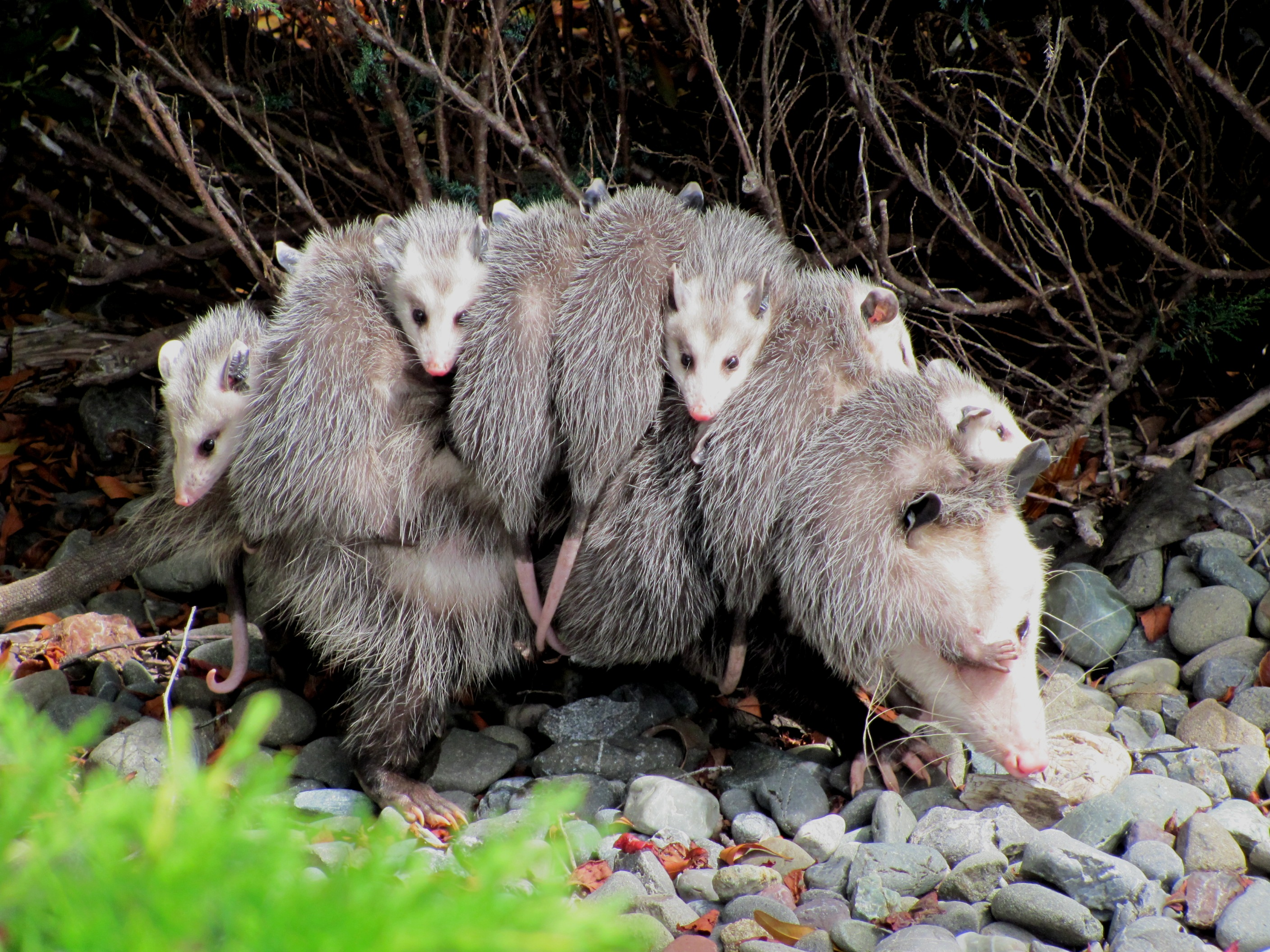
- Virginia opossum, Didelphis virginiana, the only U.S. and Canadian species (mother with nine young)

Scientific classification
- Kingdom: Animalia
- Phylum: Chordata
- Class: Mammalia
- Infraclass: Marsupialia
- Superorder: Ameridelphia
- Order: Didelphimorphia; Gill, 1872
- Family: Didelphidae; J.E. Gray, 1821

Type genus
- Didelphis Linnaeus, 1758

Genera
- See text

Diversity
- 126 species
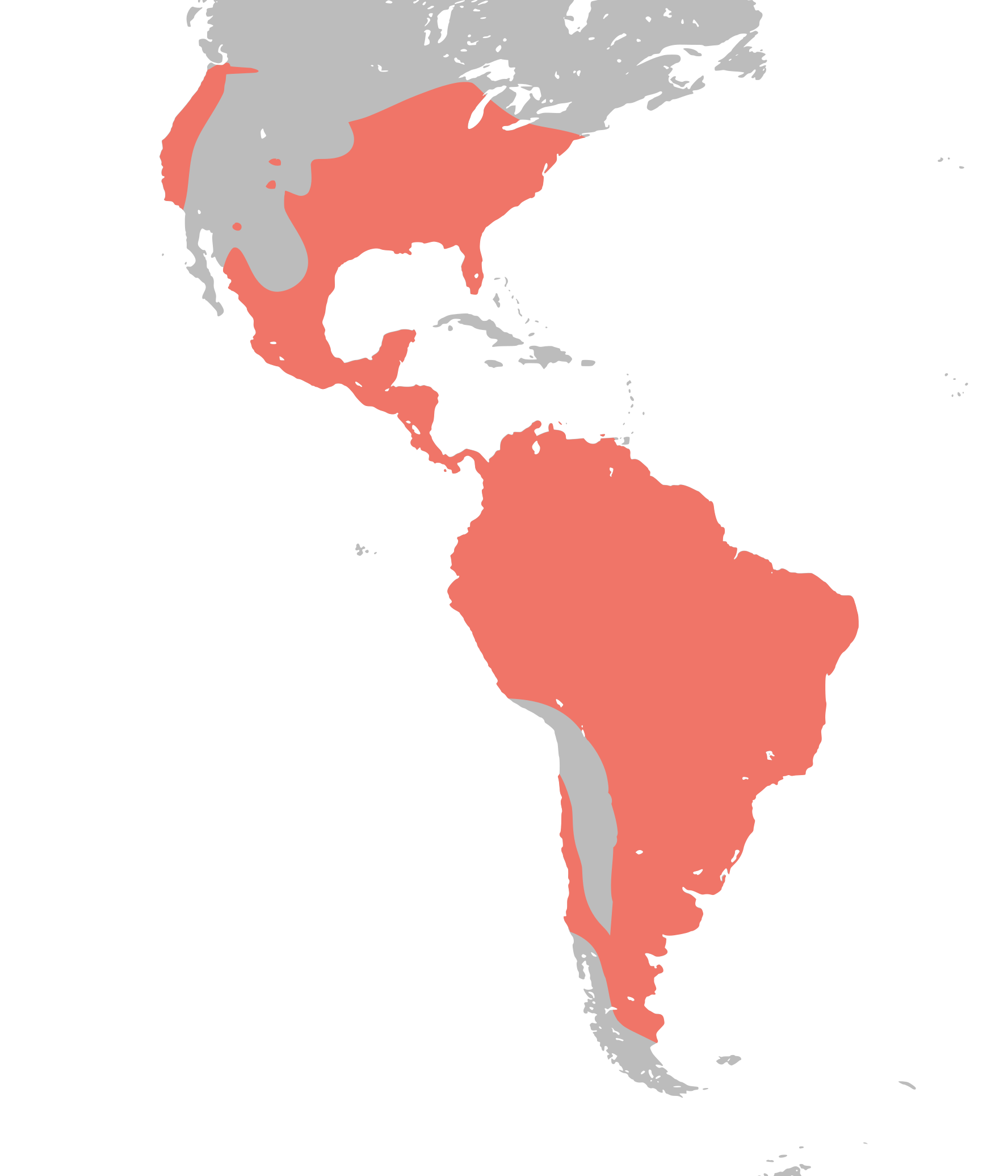
- Didelphidae distribution

= Opossum =

Didelphidae Temporal range: Early Miocene – Recent

Group of marsupial mammals

Opossums (/əˈpɒsəmz/) are members of the marsupial order Didelphimorphia (/daɪˌdɛlfɪˈmɔːrfiə/) endemic to the Americas. The largest order of marsupials in the Western Hemisphere, it comprises 126 species in 18 genera. Opossums originated in South America and entered North America in the Great American Interchange following the connection of North and South America in the late Cenozoic.

The Virginia opossum is the only species found in the United States and Canada. It is often simply referred to as an opossum; in North America, it is commonly referred to as a possum (/ˈpɒsəm/; sometimes rendered as 'possum in written form to indicate the dropped "o"). The Australasian arboreal marsupials of suborder Phalangeriformes are also called possums because of their resemblance to opossums, but they belong to a different order. The opossum is typically a nonaggressive animal and does not often transmit rabies.

== Etymology ==
The word opossum is derived from the Powhatan language and was first recorded between 1607 and 1611 by John Smith (as opassom) and William Strachey (as aposoum). Possum was first recorded in 1613. Both men encountered the language at the English settlement of Jamestown, Virginia, which Smith helped to found and where Strachey later served as its first secretary. Strachey's notes describe the opossum as a "beast in bigness of a pig and in taste alike," while Smith recorded it "hath an head like a swine ... tail like a rat ... of the bigness of a cat." The Powhatan word ultimately derives from a Proto-Algonquian word (*wa·p-aʔθemwa) meaning "white dog or dog-like beast."

Following the arrival of Europeans in Australia, the term possum was borrowed to describe distantly related Australian marsupials of the suborder Phalangeriformes, which are more closely related to other Australian marsupials such as kangaroos.

Didelphimorphia comes from Ancient Greek δι- (di-), meaning "two", δελφύς (delphús), meaning "womb", and μορφή (morphḗ), meaning "form".

== Evolution ==
Opossums are often considered to be "living fossils", and as a result they are often used to approximate the ancestral therian condition in comparative studies. But the oldest opossum fossils are from a more recent epoch, the early Miocene (roughly 20 million years ago). The last common ancestor of all living opossums dates approximately to the Oligocene–Miocene boundary (23 million years ago) and is at most no older than Oligocene in age. Many extinct metatherians, such as Alphadon, Peradectes, Herpetotherium, and Pucadelphys, were once considered to be early opossums, but it has since been recognized that this was solely on the basis of plesiomorphies; they are now considered to belong to older branches of Metatheria that are only distantly related to modern opossums.

Opossums probably originated in the Amazonia region of northern South America, where they began their initial diversification. They were minor components of South American mammal faunas until the late Miocene, when they began to diversify rapidly. Before that time, the ecological niches presently occupied by opossums were occupied by other groups of metatherians such as paucituberculatans and sparassodonts. Large opossums like Didelphis show a pattern of gradually increasing in size over geologic time as sparassodont diversity declined. Several groups of opossums, including Thylophorops, Thylatheridium, Hyperdidelphys, and sparassocynids developed carnivorous adaptations during the late Miocene-Pliocene, before the arrival of carnivorans in South America. Most of these groups, with the exception of Lutreolina, are now extinct. It has been suggested that the size and shape of the ancestral didelphid's jaw would most closely match that of the modern Marmosa genus.

== Characteristics ==
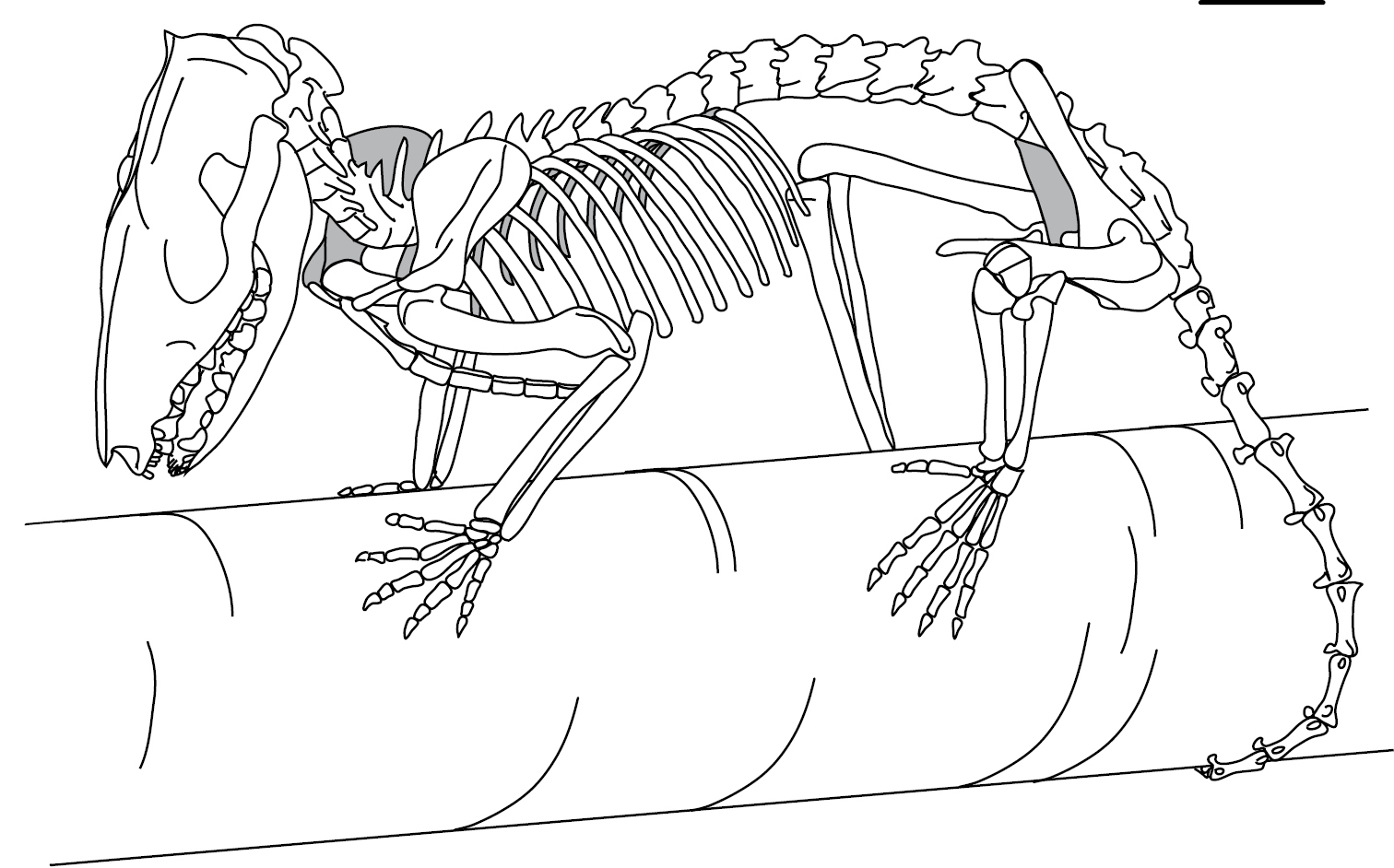
Skeleton of the gray short-tailed opossum (Monodelphis domestica)

Didelphimorphs are small to medium-sized marsupials that grow to the size of a house cat. They tend to be semi-arboreal omnivores, although there are many exceptions. Most members of this order have long snouts, a narrow braincase, and a prominent sagittal crest. The dental formula is: 5.1.3.44.1.3.4 × 2 = 50 teeth. By mammalian standards, this is an unusually full jaw. The incisors are very small, the canines large, and the molars are tricuspid.

Didelphimorphs have a plantigrade stance (feet flat on the ground) and the hind feet have an opposable digit with no claw. Like some New World monkeys, some opossums have prehensile tails. Like most marsupials, many females have a pouch. The tail and parts of the feet bear scutes. The stomach is simple, with a small cecum. Like most marsupials, the male opossum has a forked penis bearing twin glandes.

Although all living opossums are essentially opportunistic omnivores, different species vary in the amount of meat and vegetation they include in their diet. Members of the Caluromyinae are essentially frugivorous, whereas the lutrine opossum and Patagonian opossum primarily feed on other animals. The water opossum or yapok (Chironectes minimus) is particularly unusual, as it is the only living semi-aquatic marsupial, using its webbed hindlimbs to dive in search of freshwater mollusks and crayfish. The extinct Thylophorops, the largest known opossum at 4–7 kg (8.8–15.4 lb), was a macropredator. Most opossums are scansorial, well-adapted to life in the trees or on the ground, but members of the Caluromyinae and Glironiinae are primarily arboreal, whereas species of Metachirus, Monodelphis, and to a lesser degree Didelphis show adaptations for life on the ground. Metachirus nudicaudatus, found in the upper Amazon basin, consumes fruit seeds, small vertebrate creatures like birds and reptiles and invertebrates like crayfish and snails, but seems to be mainly insectivorous.

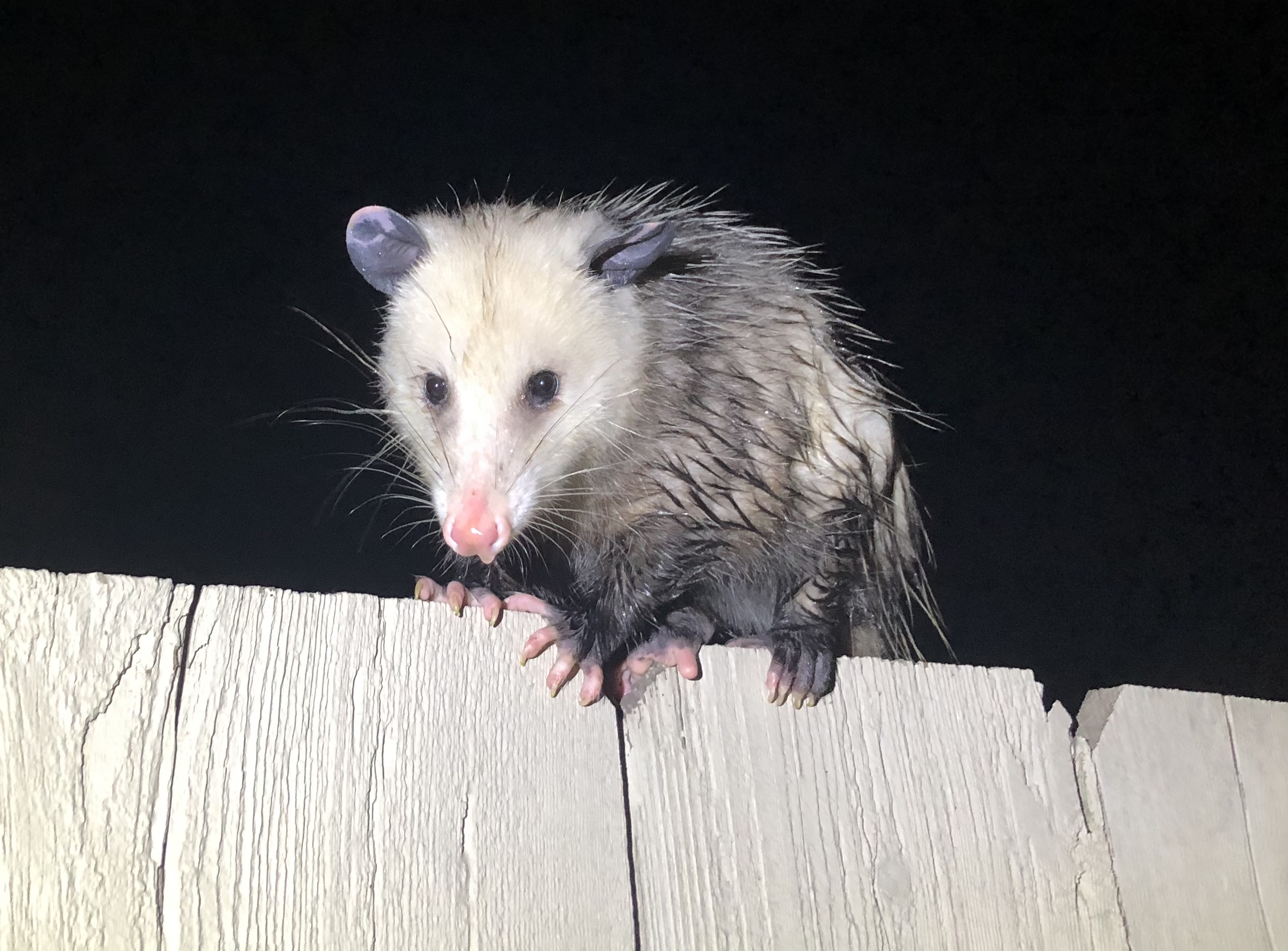
Virginia opossum on top of a fence

=== Reproduction and life cycle ===
As marsupials, female opossums have a reproductive system that includes a bifurcated vagina and a divided uterus; many have a pouch. The average estrous cycle of the Virginia opossum is about 28 days. Opossums do possess a placenta, but it is short-lived, simple in structure, and, unlike that of placental mammals, not fully functional. The young are therefore born at a very early stage, although the gestation period is similar to that of many other small marsupials, at only 12 to 14 days. They give birth to litters of up to 20 young. Once born, the offspring must find their way into the marsupium, if present, to hold on to and nurse from a teat. Baby opossums, like their Australian cousins, are called joeys. Female opossums often give birth to very large numbers of young, most of which fail to attach to a teat, although as many as 13 young can attach, and therefore survive, depending on species. The young are weaned between 70 and 125 days, when they detach from the teat and leave the pouch. The opossum lifespan is unusually short for a mammal of its size, usually only one to two years in the wild and as long as four or more years in captivity. Senescence is rapid. Opossums are moderately sexually dimorphic with males usually being larger, heavier, and having larger canines than females. The largest difference between the opossum and non-marsupial mammals is the bifurcated penis of the male and bifurcated vagina of the female (the source of the term didelphimorph, from the Greek didelphys, meaning "double-wombed"). Opossum spermatozoa exhibit sperm-pairing, forming conjugate pairs in the epididymis. This may ensure that flagella movement can be accurately coordinated for maximal motility. Conjugate pairs dissociate into separate spermatozoa before fertilization.

=== Behavior ===
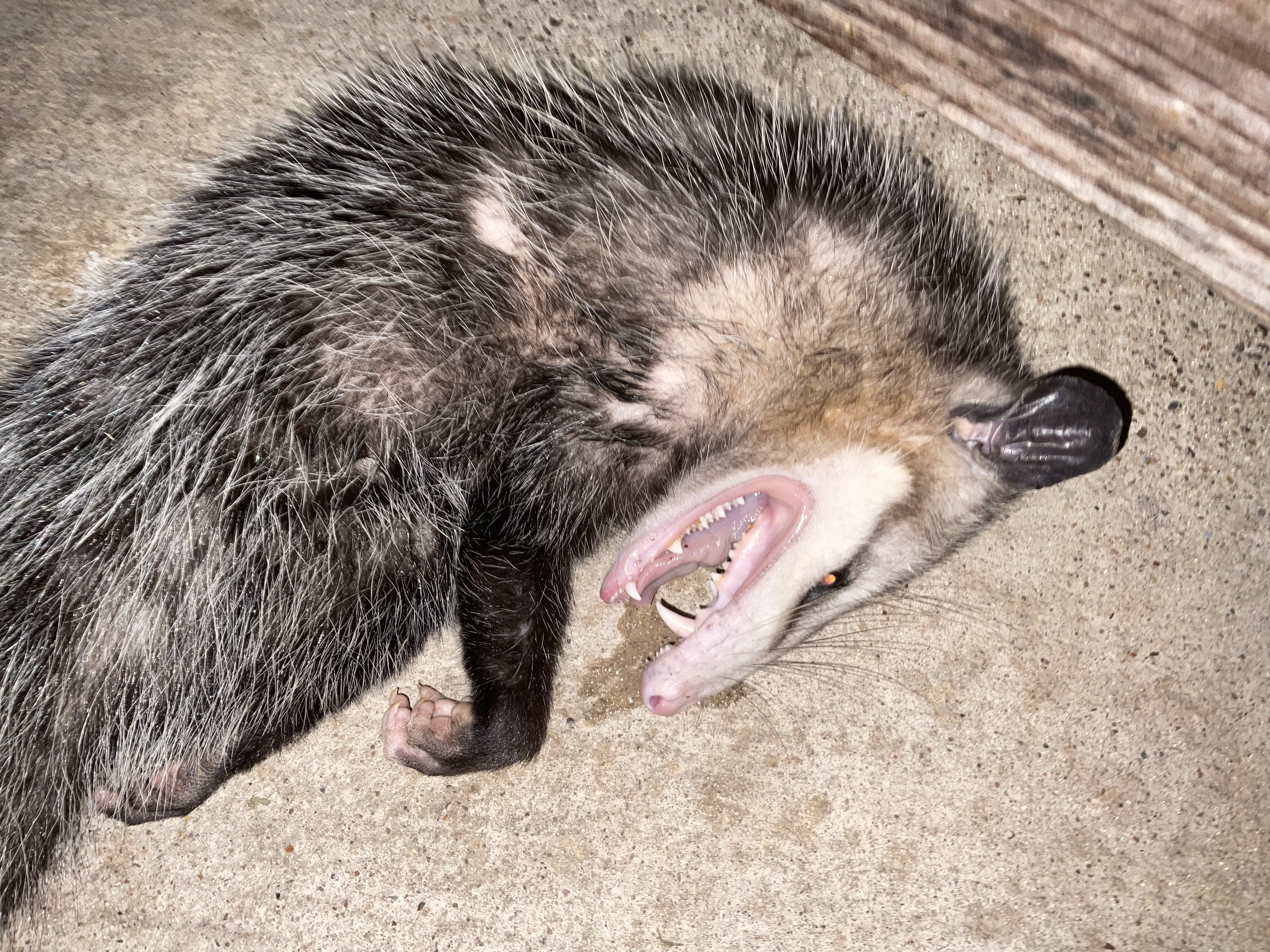
Virginia opossum feigning death, or "playing possum"

Opossums are usually solitary and nomadic, staying in one area as long as food and water are easily available. Some families will group together in ready-made burrows or even under houses. Though they will temporarily occupy abandoned burrows, they do not dig or put much effort into building their own. As nocturnal animals, they favor dark, secure areas. These areas may be below ground or above.

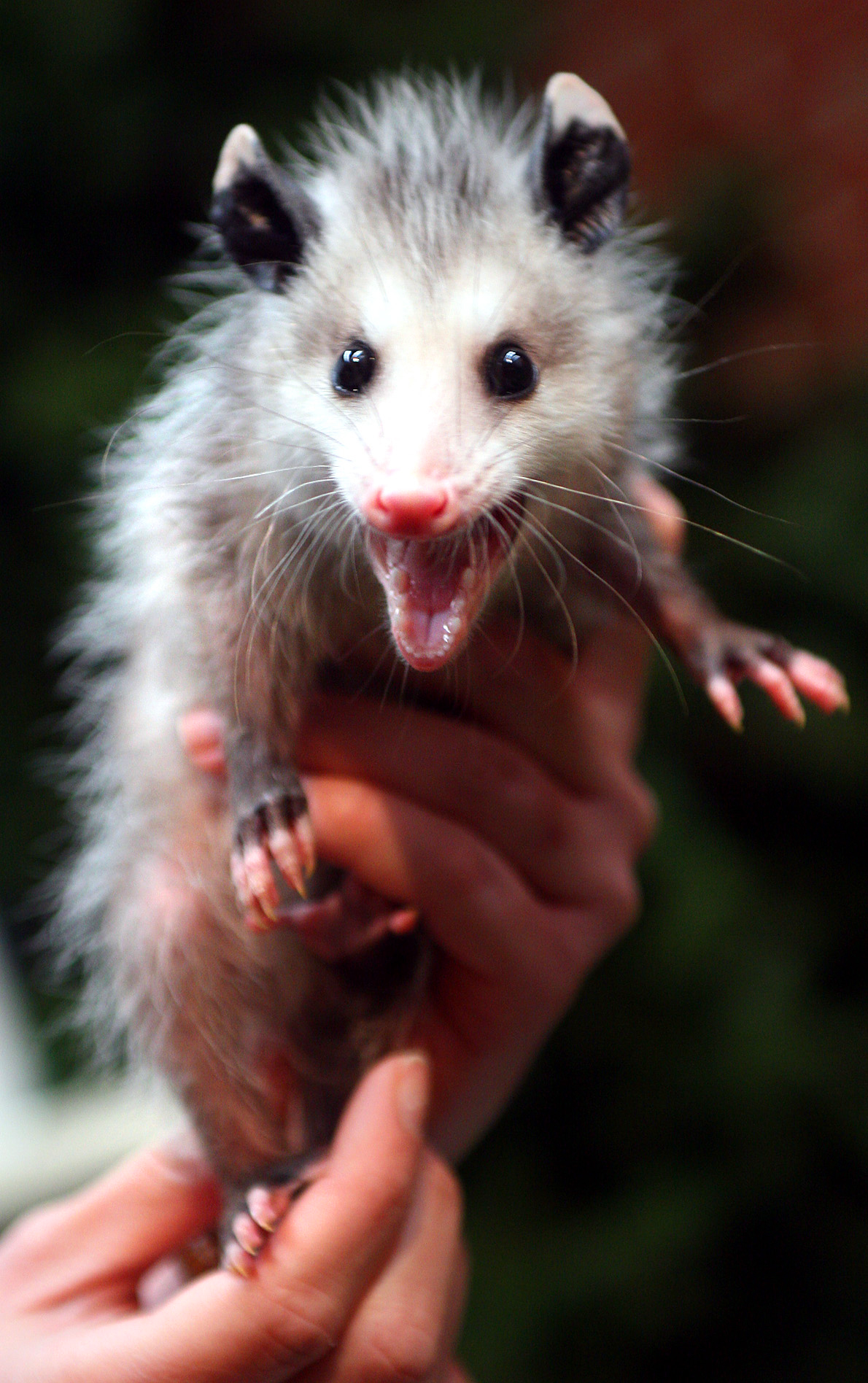
Juvenile Virginia opossum hissing defensively

When threatened or harmed, they will "play possum", mimicking the appearance and smell of a sick or dead animal. This physiological response is involuntary (like fainting), rather than a conscious act. In the case of baby opossums, however, the brain does not always react this way at the appropriate moment, and therefore they often fail to "play dead" when threatened. When an opossum is "playing possum", the animal's lips are drawn back, the teeth are bared, saliva foams around the mouth, the eyes close or half-close, and a foul-smelling fluid is secreted from the anal glands. The stiff, curled form can be prodded, turned over, and even carried away without reaction. The animal will typically regain consciousness after a period of a few minutes to four hours, a process that begins with a slight twitching of the ears.

Some species of opossums have prehensile tails, although dangling by the tail is more common among juveniles. An opossum may also use its tail as a brace and a fifth limb when climbing. The tail is occasionally used as a grip to carry bunches of leaves or bedding materials to the nest. A mother will sometimes carry her young upon her back, where they will cling tightly even when she is climbing or running.

Threatened opossums (especially males) will growl deeply, raising their pitch as the threat becomes more urgent. Males make a clicking "smack" noise out of the side of their mouths as they wander in search of a mate, and females will sometimes repeat the sound in return. When separated or distressed, baby opossums will make a sneezing noise to signal their mother. The mother in return makes a clicking sound and waits for the baby to find her. If threatened, the baby will open its mouth and quietly hiss until the threat is gone.

== Diet ==
Opossums eat insects, rodents, birds, eggs, frogs, plants, fruits and grain. Some species may eat the skeletal remains of rodents and roadkill animals to fulfill their calcium requirements. In captivity, opossums will eat practically anything including dog and cat food, livestock fodder and discarded human food scraps and waste.

Many large opossums (Didelphini) are immune to the venom of rattlesnakes and pit vipers (Crotalinae) and regularly prey upon these snakes. This adaptation seems to be unique to the Didelphini, as their closest relative, the brown four-eyed opossum, is not immune to snake venom. Similar adaptations are seen in other small predatory mammals such as mongooses and hedgehogs. Didelphin opossums and crotaline vipers have been suggested to be in an evolutionary arms race. Some authors have suggested that this adaptation originally arose as a defense mechanism, allowing a rare reversal of an evolutionary arms race where the former prey has become the predator, whereas others have suggested it arose as a predatory adaptation given that it also occurs in other predatory mammals and does not occur in opossums that do not regularly eat other vertebrates. The fer-de-lance, one of the most venomous snakes in the New World, may have developed its highly potent venom as a means to prey on, or as a defense mechanism against, large opossums.

== Range and habitat ==
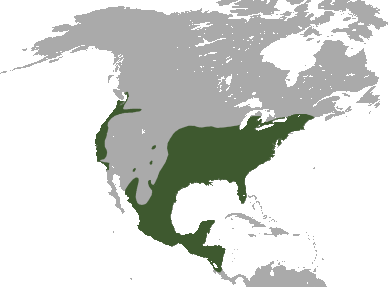
D. virginiana range, including introductions in the west. These areas expanded northwards (e.g., into Wisconsin and Minnesota).

Opossums are found in North, Central, and South America. The Virginia opossum lives in regions as far north as Canada and as far south as Central America, while other types of opossums only inhabit countries south of the United States. The Virginia opossum can often be found in wooded areas, though its habitat may vary widely. Opossums are generally found in areas like forests, shrubland, mangrove swamps, rainforests and eucalyptus forests. Opossums have been found moving northward.

== Hunting and foodways ==
Until the early 20th century, the Virginia opossum was widely hunted and consumed in the United States. Opossum farms have been operated in the United States in the past. Sweet potatoes were eaten together with the opossum in the American South. In 1909, a "Possum and 'Taters" banquet was held in Atlanta to honor President-elect William Howard Taft. South Carolina cuisine includes opossum, and President Jimmy Carter hunted opossums in addition to other small game.

In Dominica, Grenada, Trinidad, Saint Lucia and Saint Vincent and the Grenadines, the common opossum or manicou is popular and can only be hunted during certain times of the year owing to overhunting. The meat is traditionally prepared by smoking, then stewing. It is light and fine-grained, but the musk glands must be removed as part of preparation. The meat can be used in place of rabbit and chicken in recipes. Historically, hunters in the Caribbean would place a barrel with fresh or rotten fruit to attract opossums that would feed on the fruit or insects.

In northern/central Mexico, opossums are known as tlacuache or tlacuatzin in Spanish, which come from the Nahuatl language words tlacuachin and tlacuatzin, respectively. Their tails are eaten as a folk remedy to improve fertility. In the Yucatán peninsula they are known in the Yucatec Mayan language as "och" and they are not considered part of the regular diet by Mayan people, but still considered edible in times of famine.

Opossum oil (possum grease) is high in essential fatty acids and has been used as a chest rub and a carrier for arthritis remedies given as salves.

Opossum pelts have long been part of the fur trade.

== Classification ==
Phylogeny of a 5,911 species 31 gene supertree

- - - Caluromyinae
      - Caluromysiops
      - Caluromys
  - - - Glironiinae
        - Chacodelphys
        - Glironia
    - - Hyladelphinae
        Hyladelphys
      - Didelphinae
        - - Marmosini
            - - Tlacuatzin
              - Marmosa
            - Monodelphis
        - - - Metachirini
              Metachirus
            - Didelphini
              - Chironectes
              - - Lutreolina
                - - Philander
                  - Didelphis
          - - Thylamyini
              - Marmosops
              - - Cryptonanus
                - - Gracilinanus
                  - - Lestodelphys
                    - Thylamys

Classification based on Voss (2022), species based on the American Society of Mammalogists (2023)

- Family Didelphidae
  - Subfamily Glironiinae
    - Genus Glironia
      - Bushy-tailed opossum (Glironia venusta)
  - Subfamily Caluromyinae
    - Genus Caluromys
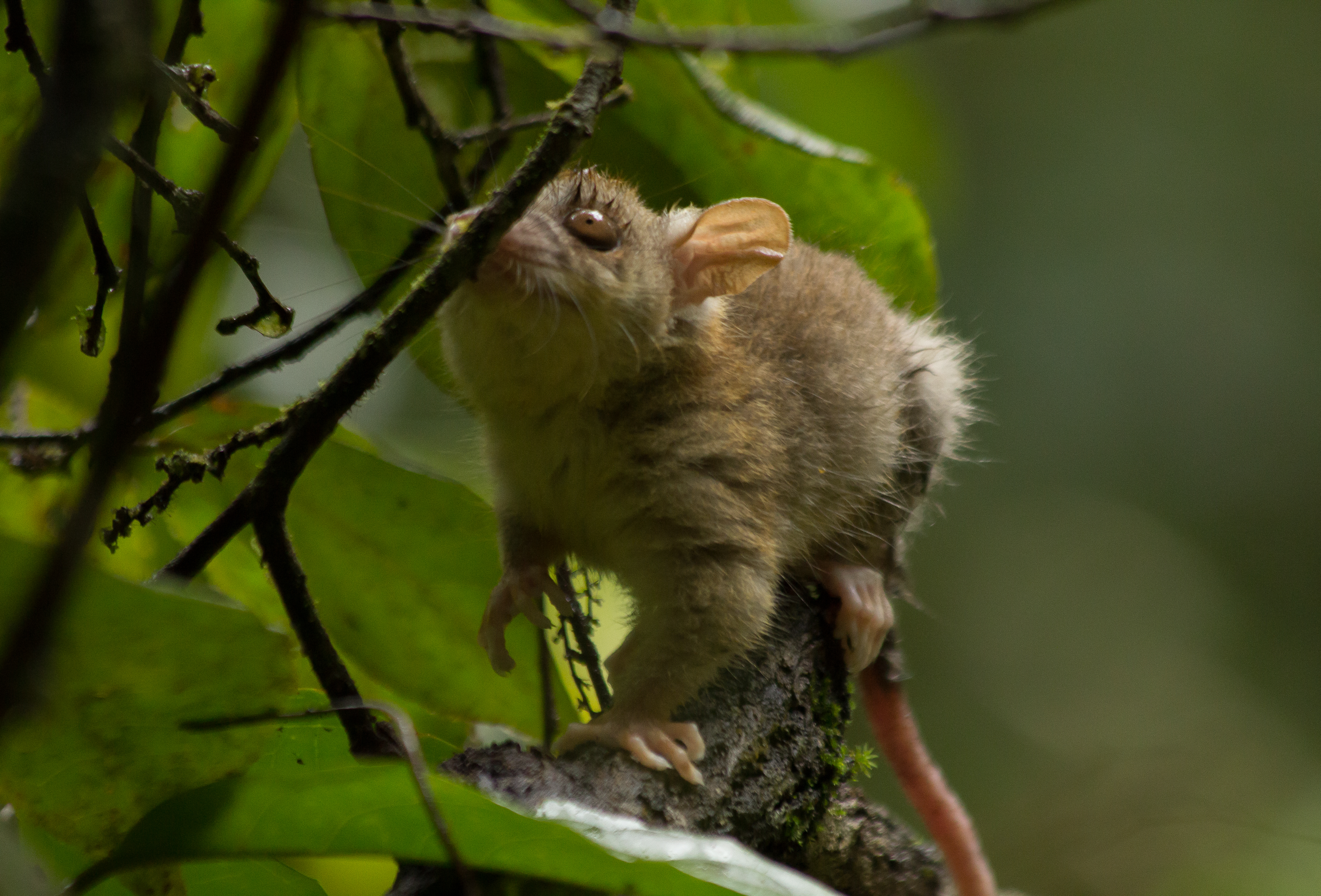
      Bare-tailed woolly opossum, Caluromys philander
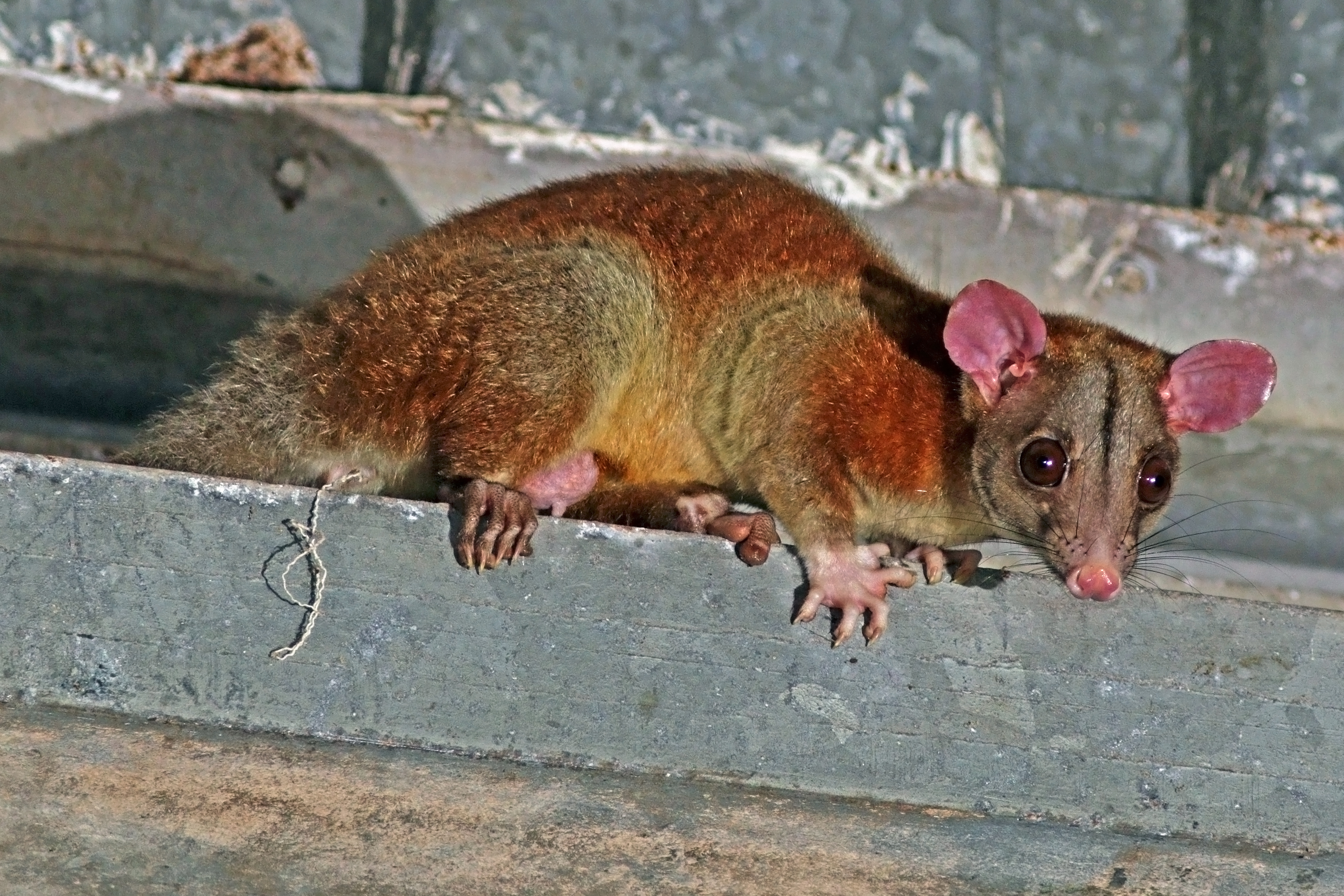
      Derby's woolly opossum, Caluromys derbianus
      - Subgenus Caluromys
        - Bare-tailed woolly opossum (Caluromys philander)
      - Subgenus Mallodelphys
        - Derby's woolly opossum (Caluromys derbianus)
        - Brown-eared woolly opossum (Caluromys lanatus)
    - Genus Caluromysiops
      - Black-shouldered opossum (Caluromysiops irrupta)
  - Subfamily Hyladelphinae
    - Genus Hyladelphys
      - Kalinowski's mouse opossum (Hyladelphys kalinowskii)
    - Genus †Sairadelphys Oliveira et al. 2011
      - †Sairadelphys tocantinensis Oliveira et al. 2011
  - Subfamily Didelphinae
    - Tribe Metachirini
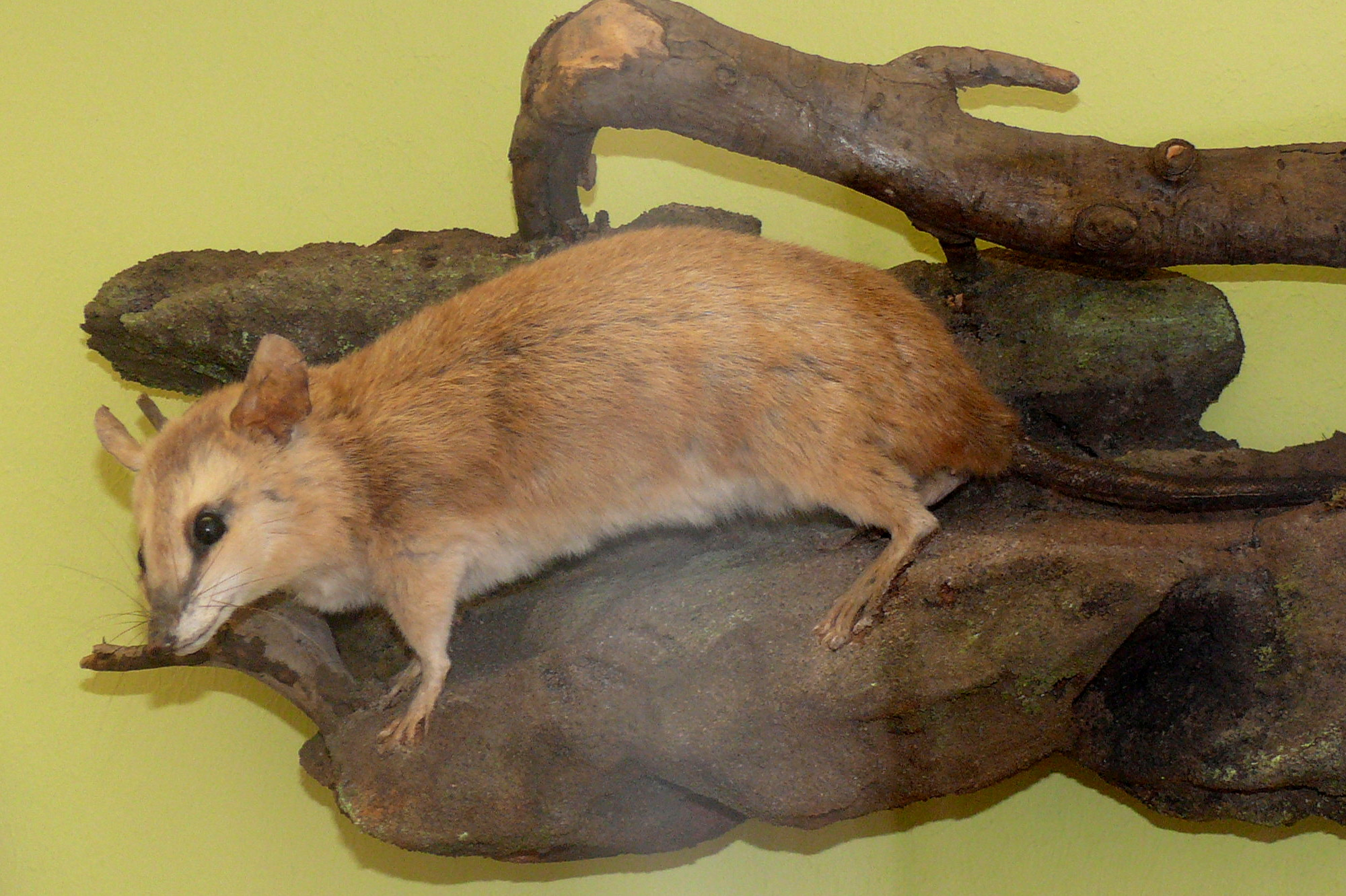
      Brown four-eyed opossum, Metachirus nudicaudatus
      - Genus Metachirus
        - Aritana's brown four-eyed opossum (Metachirus aritanai)
        - Common brown four-eyed opossum (Metachirus myosuros)
        - Guianan brown four-eyed opossum (Metachirus nudicaudatus)
    - Tribe Didelphini
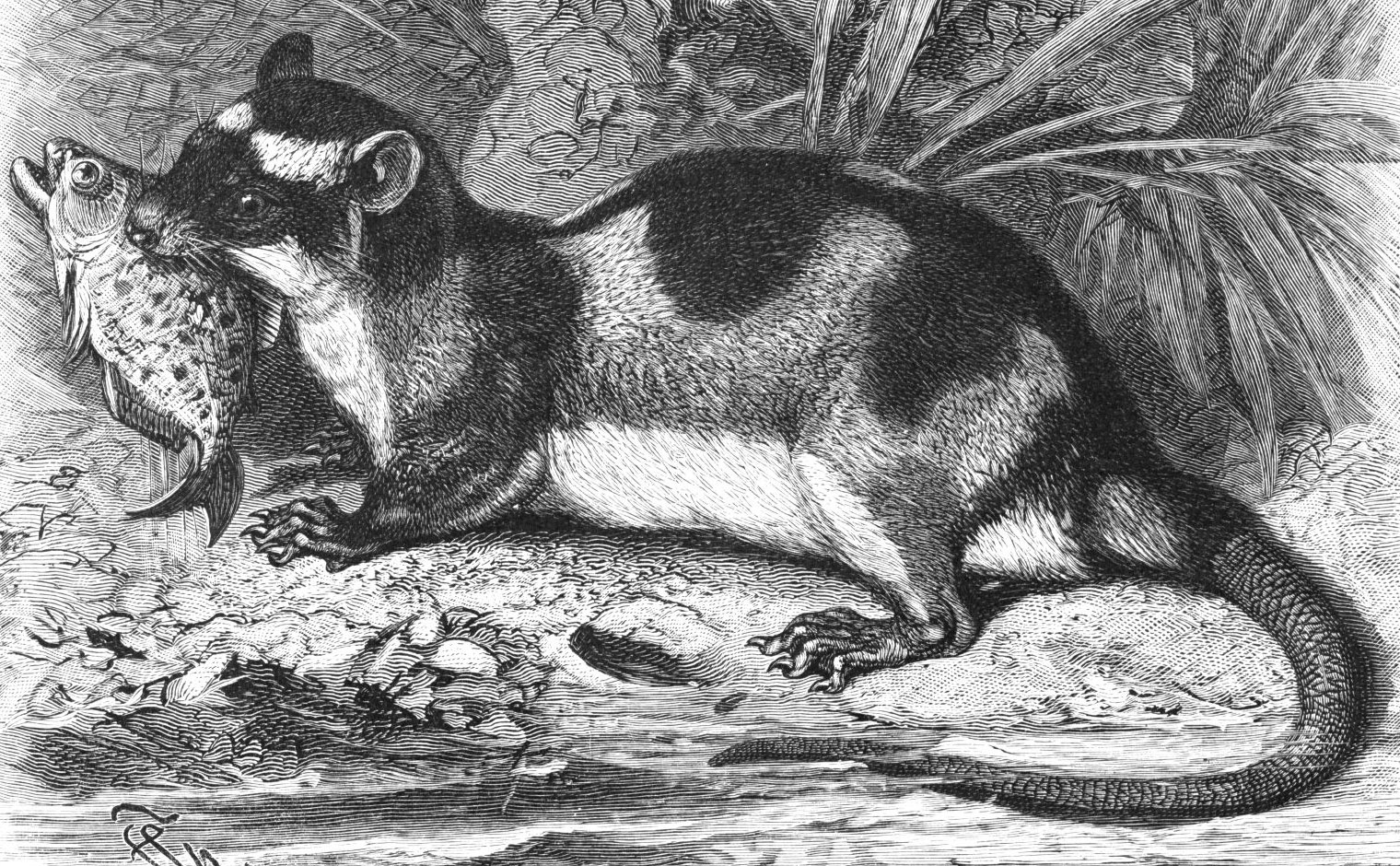
      Water opossum, Chironectes minimus
      - Genus Chironectes
        - Water opossum or yapok (Chironectes minimus)
      - Genus Lutreolina
        - †Lutreolina biforata (Ameghino 1904) Goin & Pardiñas 1996
        - Big lutrine opossum or little water opossum (Lutreolina crassicaudata)
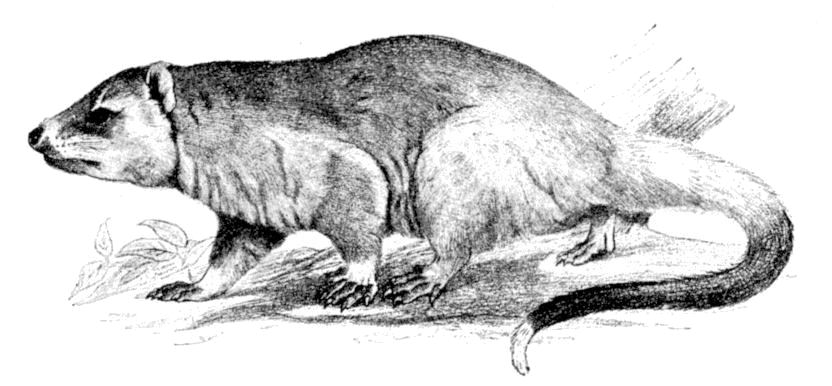
          Big lutrine opossum, Lutreolina crassicaudata
        - †Lutreolina materdei Goin & De los Reyes 2011
        - Massoia's lutrine opossum (Lutreolina massoia)
        - †Lutreolina tracheia Rovereto 1914
      - †Genus Hyperdidelphys Ameghino 1904
        - †Hyperdidelphys dimartinoi Goin & Pardiñas 1996
        - †Hyperdidelphys inexpectata (Ameghino 1889) Marshall 1982
        - †Hyperdidelphys parvula Ameghino 1904
        - †Hyperdidelphys pattersoni (Reig 1952) Marshall 1982
      - Genus Didelphis
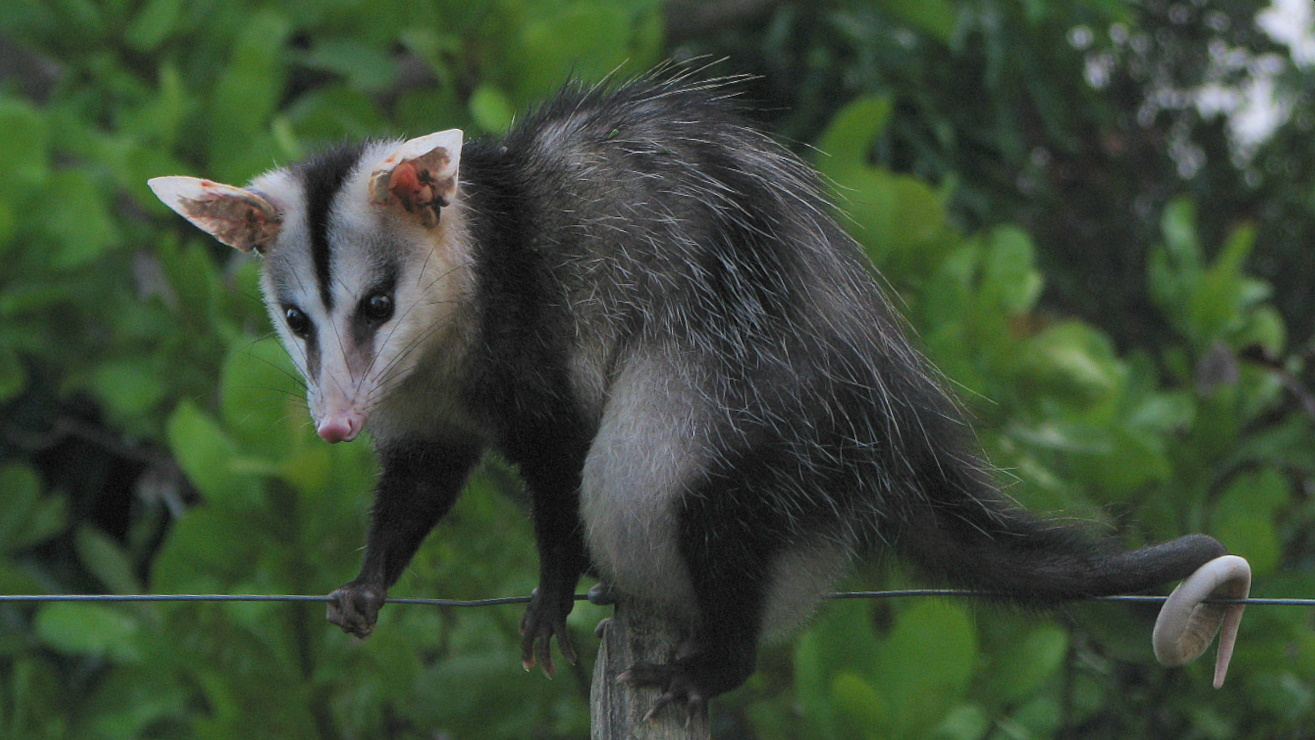
        White-eared opossum, Didelphis albiventris
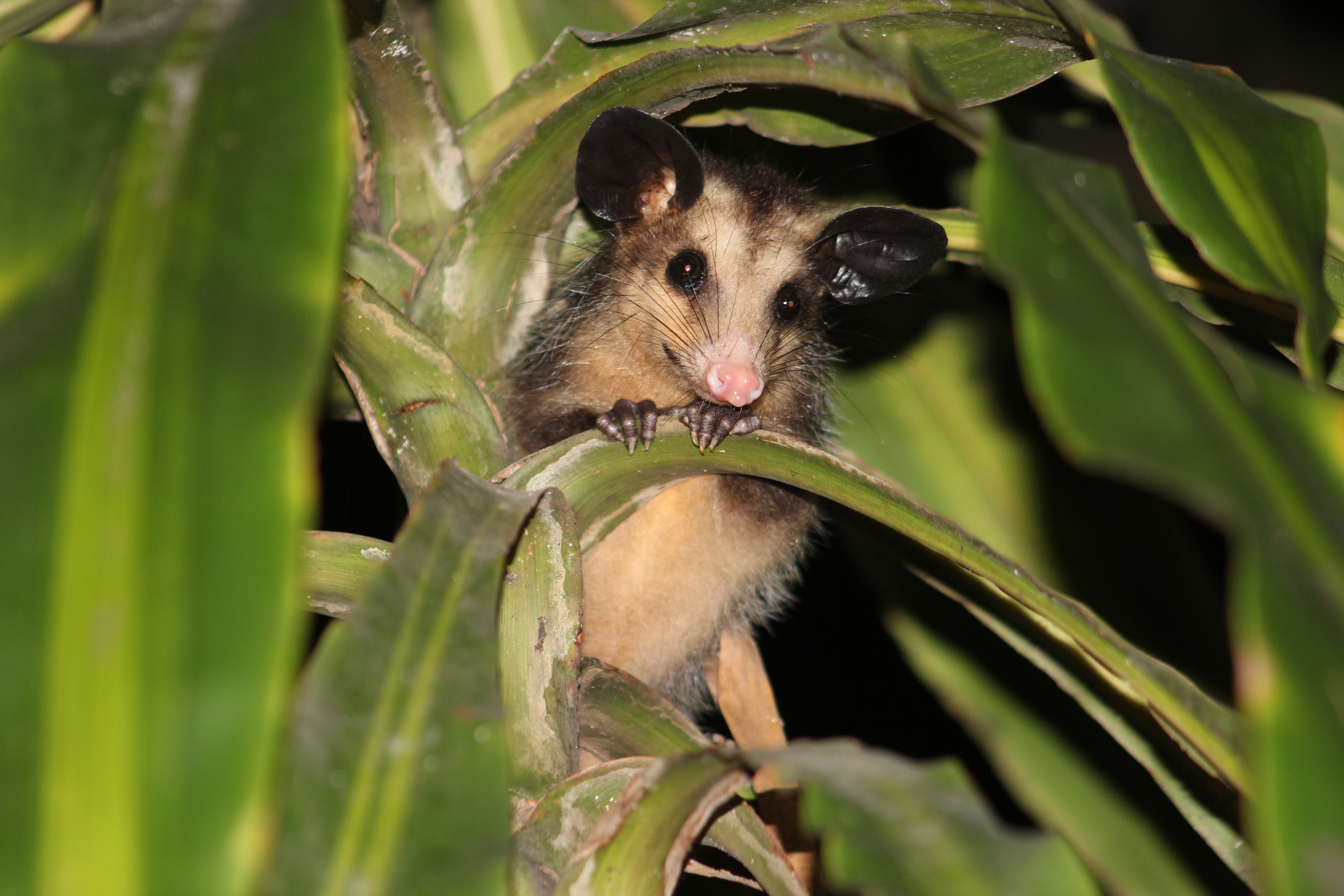
        Big-eared opossum, Didelphis aurita
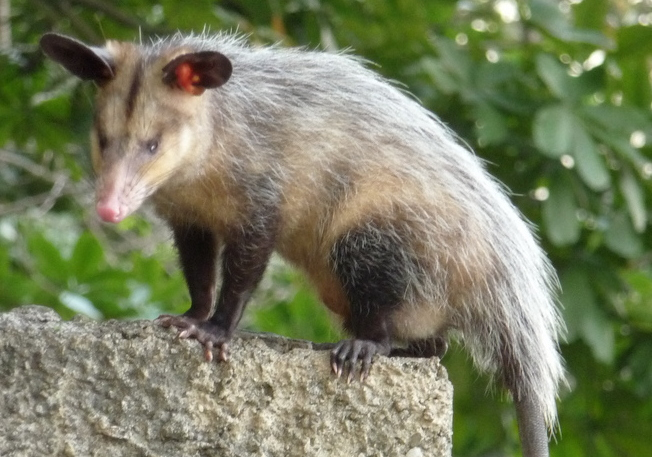
        Common opossum, Didelphis marsupialis
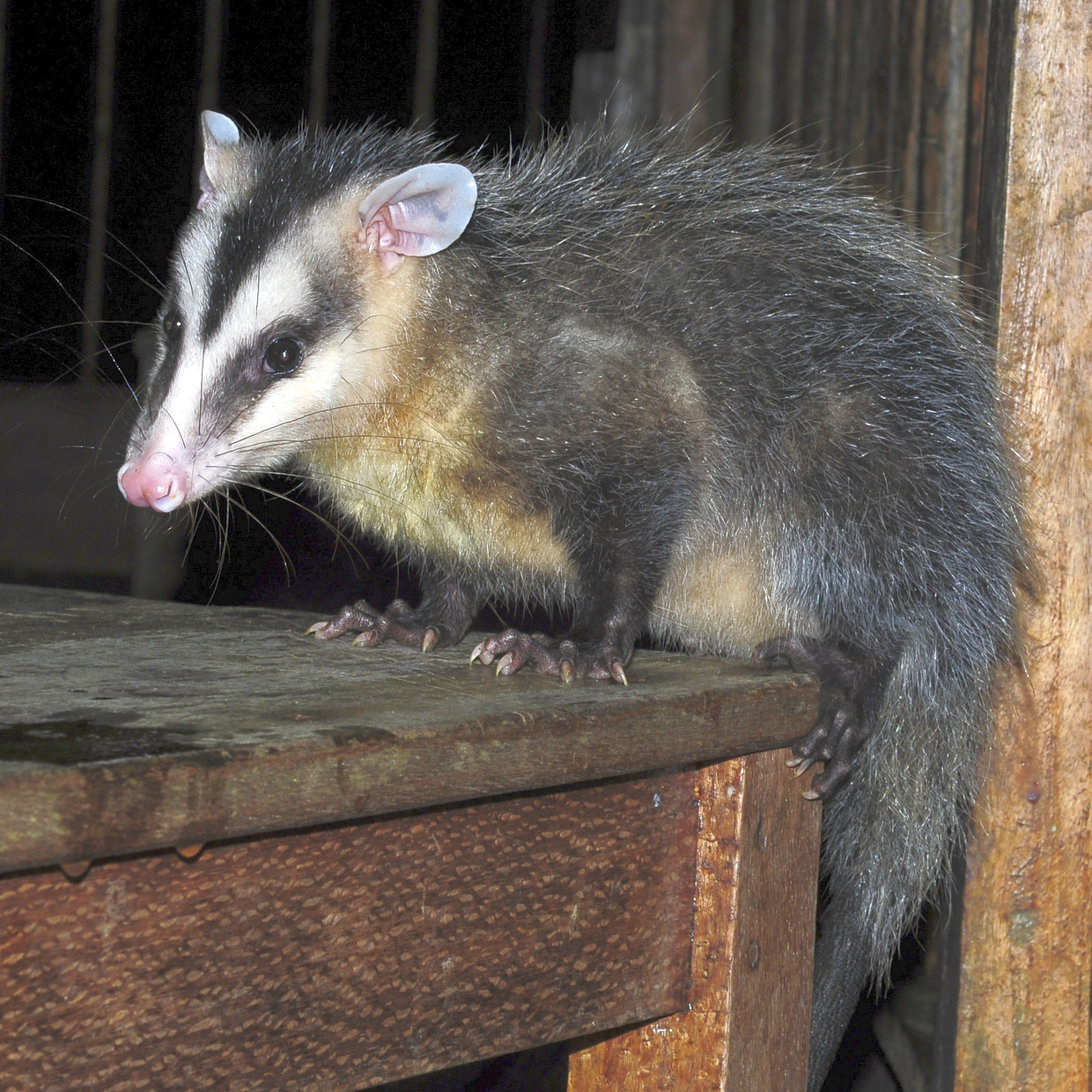
        Andean white-eared opossum, Didelphis pernigra
        - White-eared opossum (Didelphis albiventris)
        - Big-eared opossum (Didelphis aurita)
        - Guianan white-eared opossum (Didelphis imperfecta)
        - Common opossum (Didelphis marsupialis)
        - Andean white-eared opossum (Didelphis pernigra)
        - †Didelphis solimoensis
        - Virginia opossum (Didelphis virginiana)
      - Genus Philander
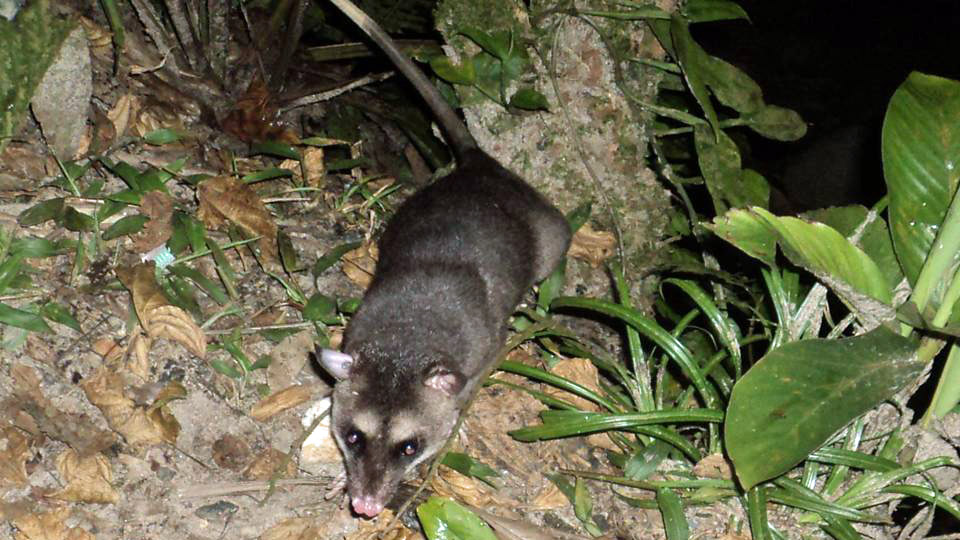
        Gray four-eyed opossum, Philander opossum
        - Anderson's four-eyed opossum (Philander andersoni)
        - Common four-eyed opossum (Philander canus)
        - Deltaic four-eyed opossum (Philander deltae)
        - Southeastern four-eyed opossum (Philander frenatus)
        - McIlhenny's four-eyed opossum (Philander mcilhennyi)
        - Dark four-eyed opossum (Philander melanurus)
        - Mondolfi's four-eyed opossum (Philander mondolfii)
        - Black four-eyed opossum (Philander nigratus)
        - Olrog's four-eyed opossum (Philander olrogi)
        - Gray four-eyed opossum (Philander opossum)
        - Pebas four-eyed opossum (Philander pebas)
        - Southern four-eyed opossum (Philander quica)
        - Northern four-eyed opossum (Philander vossi)
      - †Genus Thylophorops Reig 1952
        - †Thylophorops chapadmalensis Reig 1952
        - †Thylophorops lorenzinii Goin et al. 2009
        - †Thylophorops perplana (Ameghino 1904) Goin & Pardiñas 1996
    - Tribe Marmosini
      - Genus †Hesperocynus Forasiepi et al. 2009
        - †Hesperocynus dolgopolae (Reig 1952) Forasiepi et al. 2009
      - Genus Marmosa
        - †Marmosa contrerasi Mones 1980
        - Subgenus Eomarmosa
          - Red mouse opossum (Marmosa rubra)
        - Subgenus Exulomarmosa
          - Isthmian mouse opossum (Marmosa isthmica)
          - Mexican mouse opossum (Marmosa mexicana)
          - Robinson's mouse opossum (Marmosa robinsoni)
          - Simon's mouse opossum (Marmosa simonsi)
          - Guajira mouse opossum (Marmosa xerophila)
          - Zeledon's mouse opossum (Marmosa zeledoni)
        - Subgenus Marmosa
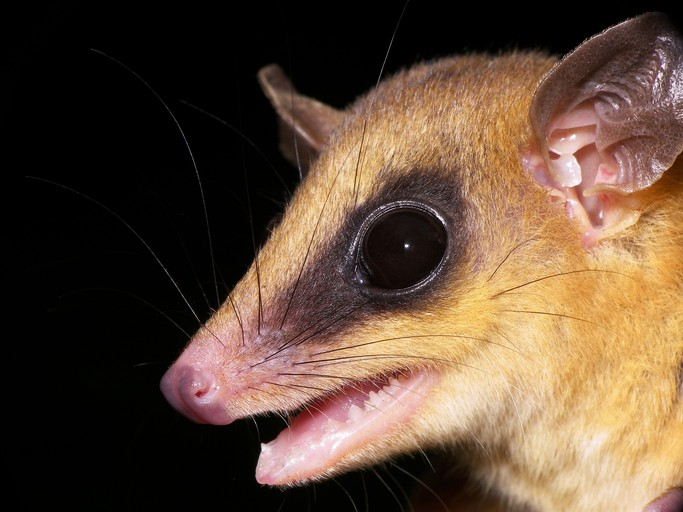
          Robinson's mouse opossum, Marmosa robinsoni
          - Quechuan mouse opossum (Marmosa macrotarsus)
          - Linnaeus's mouse opossum (Marmosa murina)
          - Tyler's mouse opossum (Marmosa tyleriana)
          - Waterhouse's mouse opossum (Marmosa waterhousei)
        - Subgenus Micoureus
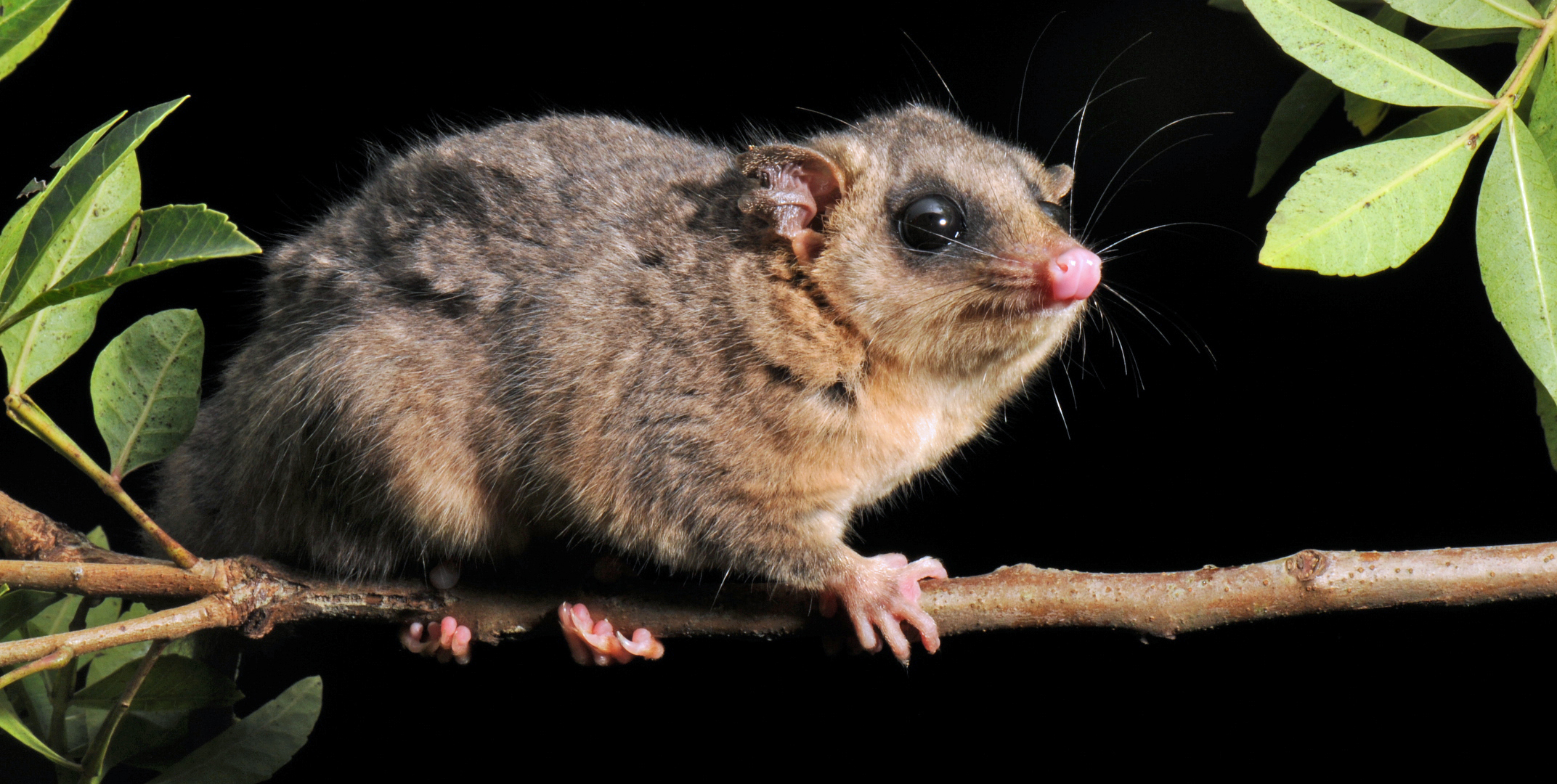
          Tate's woolly mouse opossum, Marmosa paraguayanus
          - Adler's mouse opossum (Marmosa adleri)
          - Alston's woolly mouse opossum (Marmosa alstoni)
          - White-bellied woolly mouse opossum (Marmosa constantiae)
          - Northeastern woolly mouse opossum (Marmosa demerarae)
          - Northwestern woolly mouse opossum (Marmosa germana)
          - Jansa's woolly mouse opossum (Marmosa jansae)
          - †Marmosa laventica Marshall 1976
          - Brazilian woolly mouse opossum (Marmosa limae)
          - Merida woolly mouse opossum (Marmosa meridae)
          - Nicaraguan woolly mouse opossum (Marmosa nicaraguae)
          - Tate's woolly mouse opossum (Marmosa paraguayana)
          - Peruvian woolly mouse opossum (Marmosa parda)
          - Anthony's woolly mouse opossum (Marmosa perplexa)
          - Little woolly mouse opossum (Marmosa phaea)
          - Bolivian woolly mouse opossum (Marmosa rapposa)
          - Bare-tailed woolly mouse opossum (Marmosa rutteri)
        - Subgenus Stegomarmosa
          - Heavy-browed mouse opossum (Marmosa andersoni)
          - Rufous mouse opossum (Marmosa lepida)
      - Genus Monodelphis
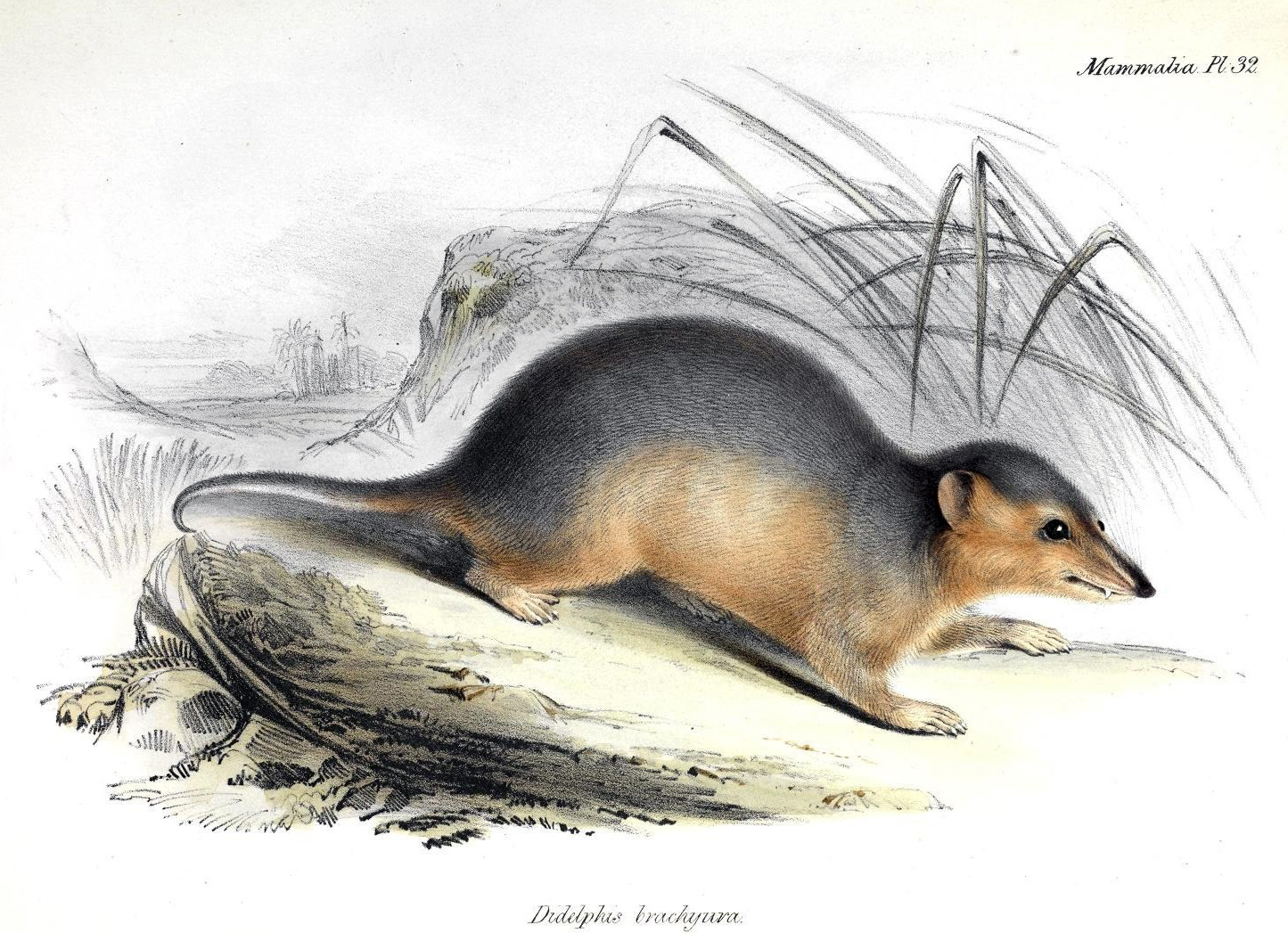
        Yellow-sided opossum, Monodelphis dimidiata
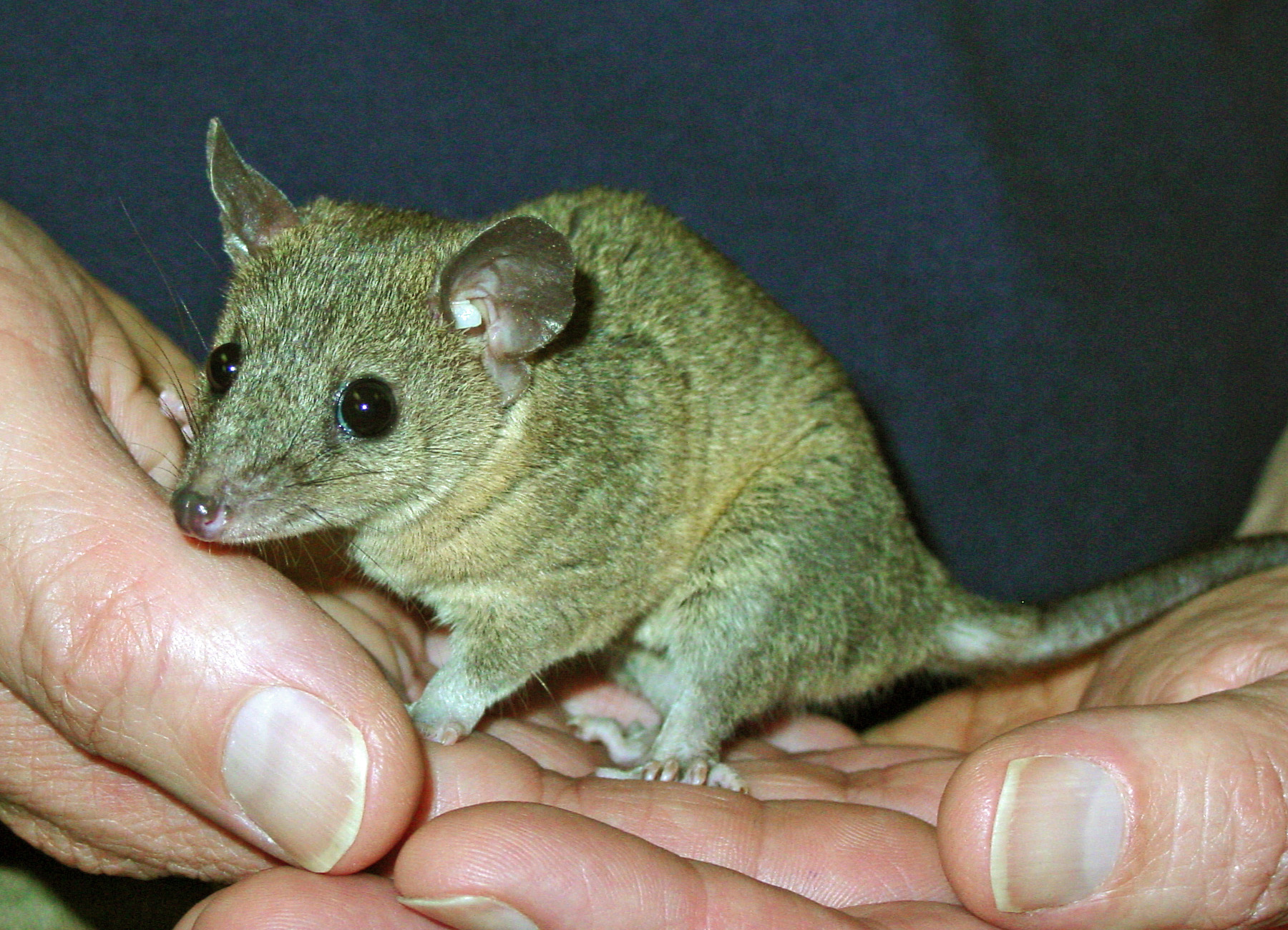
        Gray short-tailed opossum, Monodelphis domestica
        - Subgenus Microdelphys
          - Northern three-striped opossum (Monodelphis americana)
          - Gardner's short-tailed opossum (Monodelphis gardneri)
          - Ihering's three-striped opossum (Monodelphis iheringi)
          - Chestnut-striped opossum (Monodelphis rubida)
          - Long-nosed short-tailed opossum (Monodelphis scalops)
          - Southern three-striped opossum (Monodelphis theresa)
          - Red three-striped opossum (Monodelphis umbristriata)
        - Subgenus Monodelphiops
          - Yellow-sided opossum (Monodelphis dimidiata)
          - Southern red-sided opossum (Monodelphis sorex)
          - One-striped opossum (Monodelphis unistriata)
        - Subgenus Monodelphis
          - Arlindo's short-tailed opossum (Monodelphis arlindoi)
          - Northern red-sided opossum (Monodelphis brevicaudata)
          - Gray short-tailed opossum (Monodelphis domestica)
          - Amazonian red-sided opossum (Monodelphis glirina)
          - Marajó short-tailed opossum (Monodelphis maraxina)
          - Hooded red-sided opossum (Monodelphis palliolata)
          - Santa Rosa short-tailed opossum (Monodelphis sanctaerosae)
          - Touan short-tailed opossum (Monodelphis touan)
          - Voss's short-tailed opossum (Monodelphis vossi)
        - Subgenus Mygalodelphys
          - Sepia short-tailed opossum (Monodelphis adusta)
          - Handley's short-tailed opossum (Monodelphis handleyi)
          - Pygmy short-tailed opossum (Monodelphis kunsi)
          - Osgood's short-tailed opossum (Monodelphis osgoodi)
          - Peruvian short-tailed opossum (Monodelphis peruviana)
          - Long-nosed short-tailed opossum (Monodelphis pinocchio)
          - Reig's opossum (Monodelphis reigi)
          - Ronald's opossum (Monodelphis ronaldi)
          - Saci short-tailed opossum (Monodelphis saci)
        - Subgenus Pyrodelphys
          - Emilia's short-tailed opossum (Monodelphis emiliae)
      - Genus †Sparassocynus Mercerat 1898
        - †Sparassocynus bahiai Mercerat 1898
        - †Sparassocynus derivatus Reig & Simpson 1972
        - †Sparassocynus maimarai Abello et al. 2015
        - †Sparassocynus heterotopicus Villarroel & Marshall 1983
      - Genus †Thylatheridium Reig 1952
        - †Thylatheridium cristatum Reig 1952
        - †Thylatheridium hudsoni Goin & Montalvo 1988
        - †Thylatheridium pascuali Reig 1958
      - Genus Tlacuatzin
        - Balsas gray mouse opossum (Tlacuatzin balsasensis)
        - Tehuantepec gray mouse opossum (Tlacuatzin canescens)
        - Yucatan gray mouse opossum (Tlacuatzin gaumeri)
        - Tres Marías gray mouse opossum (Tlacuatzin insularis)
        - Northern gray mouse opossum (Tlacuatzin sinaloae)
      - †Genus Zygolestes Ameghino 1898
        - †Zygolestes paramensis Ameghino 1898
        - †Zygolestes tatei Goin, Montalvo & Visconti 2000
    - Tribe Thylamyini
      - Genus Chacodelphys
        - Chacoan pygmy opossum (Chacodelphys formosa)
      - Genus Cryptonanus
        - Agricola's gracile opossum (Cryptonanus agricolai)
        - Chacoan gracile opossum (Cryptonanus chacoensis)
        - Guahiba gracile opossum (Cryptonanus guahybae)
        - †Red-bellied gracile opossum (Cryptonanus ignitus)
        - Unduavi gracile opossum (Cryptonanus unduaviensis)
      - Genus Gracilinanus
        - Aceramarca gracile opossum (Gracilinanus aceramarcae)
        - Agile gracile opossum (Gracilinanus agilis)
        - Wood sprite gracile opossum (Gracilinanus dryas)
        - Emilia's gracile opossum (Gracilinanus emilae)
        - Northern gracile opossum (Gracilinanus marica)
        - Brazilian gracile opossum (Gracilinanus microtarsus)
        - Peruvian opossum (Gracilinanus peruanus)
      - Genus Lestodelphys
        - Patagonian opossum (Lestodelphys halli)
        - †Lestodelphys juga (Ameghino 1889)
      - Genus Marmosops
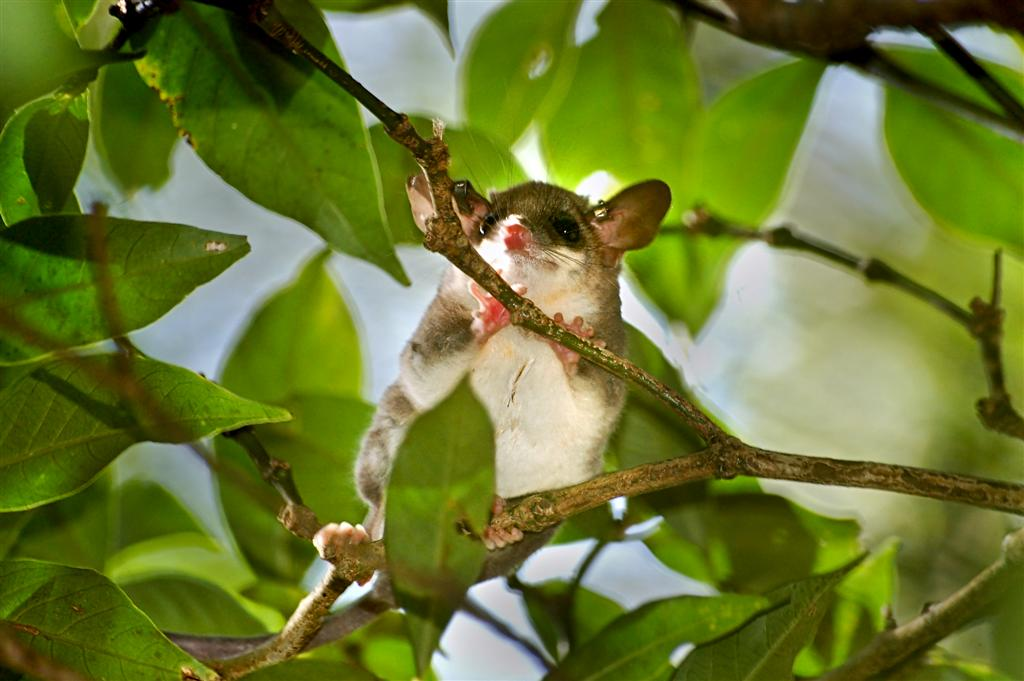
        Gray slender opossum, Marmosops incanus
        - Subgenus Marmosops
          - Tschudi's slender opossum (Marmosops caucae)
          - Creighton's slender opossum (Marmosops creightoni)
          - Dorothy's slender opossum (Marmosops dorothea)
          - Andean slender mouse opossum (Marmosops impavidus)
          - Gray slender opossum (Marmosops incanus)
          - Neblina slender opossum (Marmosops neblina)
          - White-bellied slender opossum (Marmosops noctivagus)
          - Spectacled slender opossum (Marmosops ocellatus)
          - Brazilian slender opossum (Marmosops paulensis)
          - Soini's slender opossum (Marmosops soinii)
        - Subgenus Sciophanes
          - Bishop's slender opossum (Marmosops bishopi)
          - Carr's slender opossum (Marmosops carri)
          - Cordillera slender opossum (Marmosops chucha)
          - Narrow-headed slender opossum (Marmosops cracens)
          - Dusky slender opossum (Marmosops fuscatus)
          - Handley's slender opossum (Marmosops handleyi)
          - Panama slender opossum (Marmosops invictus)
          - Junin slender opossum (Marmosops juninensis)
          - Río Magdalena slender opossum (Marmosops magdalenae)
          - Silva's slender opossum (Marmosops marina)
          - Ojasti's slender opossum (Marmosops ojastii)
          - Pantepui slender opossum (Marmosops pakaraimae)
          - Delicate slender opossum (Marmosops parvidens)
          - Pinheiro's slender opossum (Marmosops pinheiroi)
          - Woodall's slender opossum (Marmosops woodalli)
      - Genus Thylamys
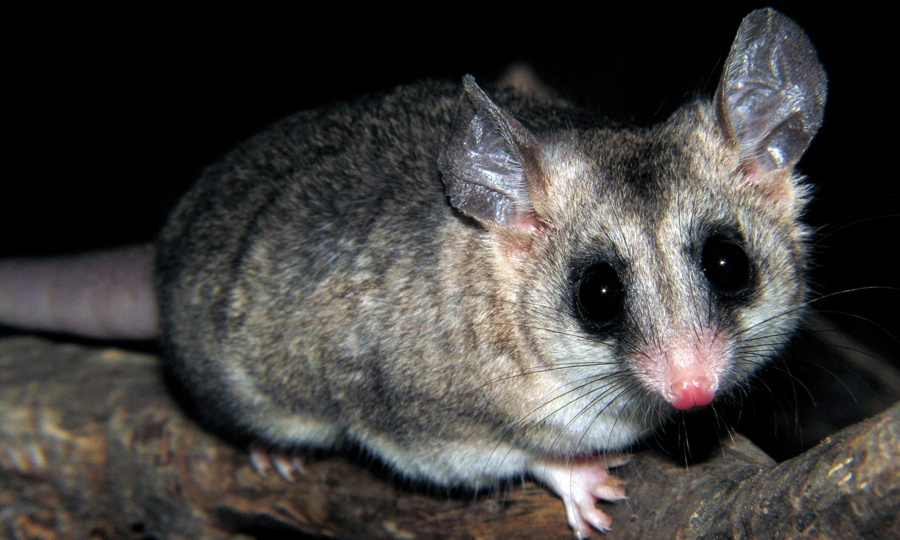
        Elegant fat-tailed mouse opossum, Thylamys elegans
        - Subgenus Thylamys
          - Cinderella fat-tailed mouse opossum (Thylamys cinderella)
          - Mesopotamian fat-tailed mouse opossum (Thylamys citellus)
          - Elegant fat-tailed mouse opossum (Thylamys elegans)
          - Paraguayan fat-tailed mouse opossum (Thylamys macrurus)
          - White-bellied fat-tailed mouse opossum (Thylamys pallidior)
          - Dry Chaco fat-tailed mouse opossum (Thylamys pulchellus)
          - Chacoan fat-tailed mouse opossum (Thylamys pusillus)
          - Argentine fat-tailed mouse opossum (Thylamys sponsorius)
          - Tate's fat-tailed mouse opossum (Thylamys tatei)
          - Buff-bellied fat-tailed mouse opossum (Thylamys venustus)
        - Subgenus Xerodelpys
          - Karimi's fat-tailed mouse opossum (Thylamys karimii)
          - Dwarf fat-tailed mouse opossum (Thylamys velutinus)
        - †Thylamys colombianus Goin 1997
        - †Thylamys minutus Goin 1997
        - †Thylamys pinei Goin, Montalvo & Visconti 2000
        - †Thylamys zettii Goin 1997

== See also ==
- List of mammals
- List of prehistoric mammals
