= Handley's short-tailed opossum =

Conservation status
- Data Deficient (IUCN 3.1)

Scientific classification
- Kingdom: Animalia
- Phylum: Chordata
- Class: Mammalia
- Infraclass: Marsupialia
- Order: Didelphimorphia
- Family: Didelphidae
- Genus: Monodelphis
- Species: M. handleyi

Binomial name
- Monodelphis handleyi Solari, 2007

Species of marsupial

Handley's short-tailed opossum (Monodelphis handleyi) is a species of mammal in the family Didelphidae. It is only known to exist in its type locality in Peru, and more recently in Brazil.

== Taxonomy ==
The holotype for the species was caught by Jessica Amanzo on February 5, 1997, in Peru.

The species is named after Charles O. Handley, Jr. to honor his contribution to the study of neotropical mammals.

== Description ==
The opossum is medium-sized and robust. It has short dorsal fur with the hair having pale gray bases and brown tips. It has dull cream underparts with a pale midventral stripe. It has a brownish head and rump, with short, white whiskers. A yellowish to orange throat gland is present. The pinnae are uniformly brown and are furless.

It has short, robust limbs.

== Distribution and habitat ==
The opossum is known only from Peru and Brazil. The specimens were caught swampy and well-drained forest bordering primary and secondary forests. The height of the tree canopy was 25-30 meters with a dense understory and abundant palms.

== Conservation ==
The opossum is assessed as data-deficient by the IUCN. There is lack of information about the animals habitat requirement, population, and habits, although probable threats include selective logging and deforestation in its range.
