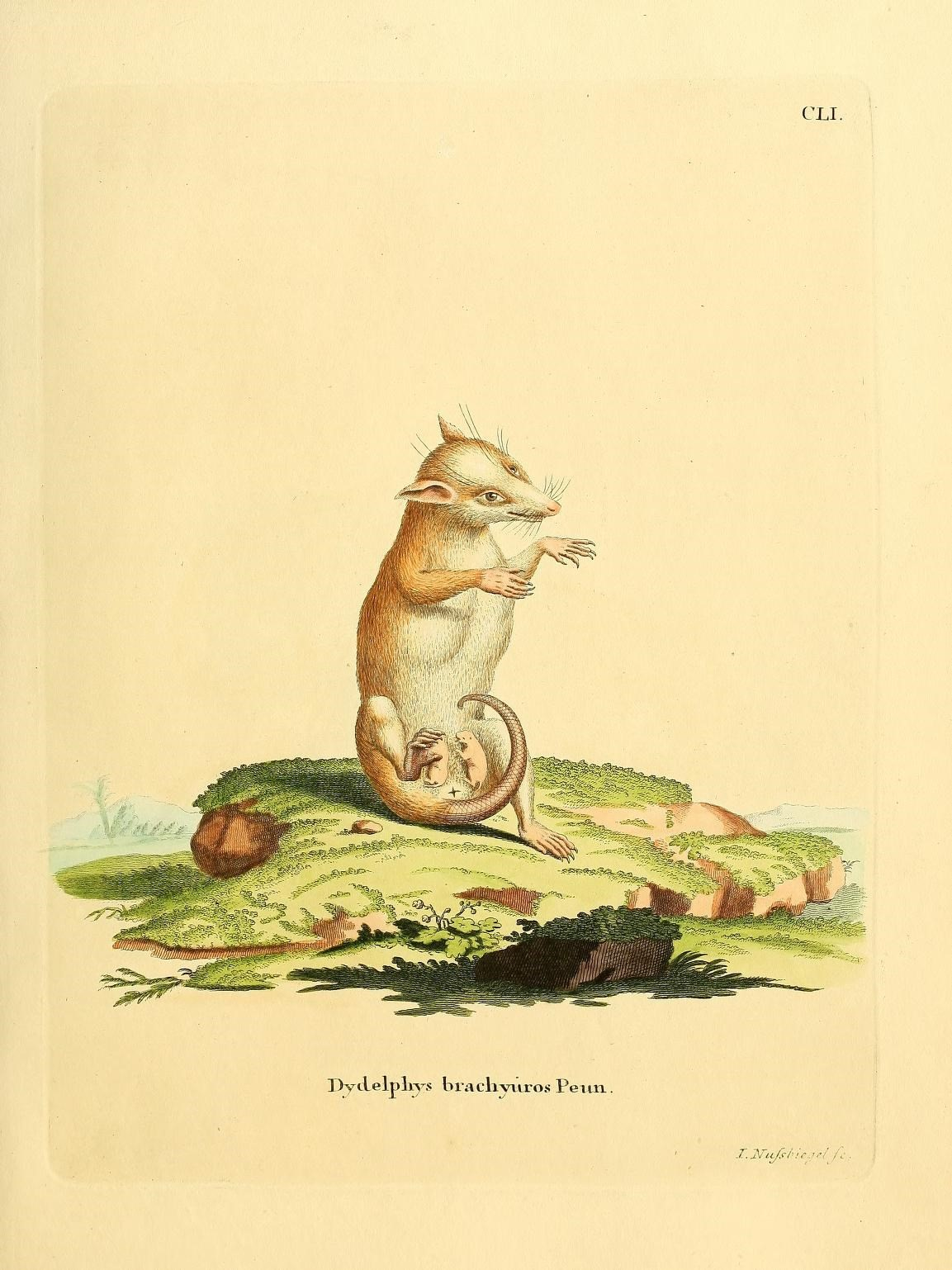
- Northern red-sided opossum illustration

Conservation status
- Least Concern (IUCN 3.1)

Scientific classification
- Kingdom: Animalia
- Phylum: Chordata
- Class: Mammalia
- Infraclass: Marsupialia
- Order: Didelphimorphia
- Family: Didelphidae
- Genus: Monodelphis
- Species: M. brevicaudata

Binomial name
- Monodelphis brevicaudata (Erxleben, 1777)
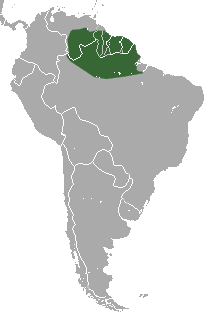
- Northern red-sided opossum range

= Northern red-sided opossum =

Species of marsupial

The northern red-sided opossum or the Guianan short-tailed opossum, Monodelphis brevicaudata, is an opossum species from South America. It is found in Bolivia, Brazil. French Guiana, Guyana, Suriname and Venezuela.

== Characteristics ==
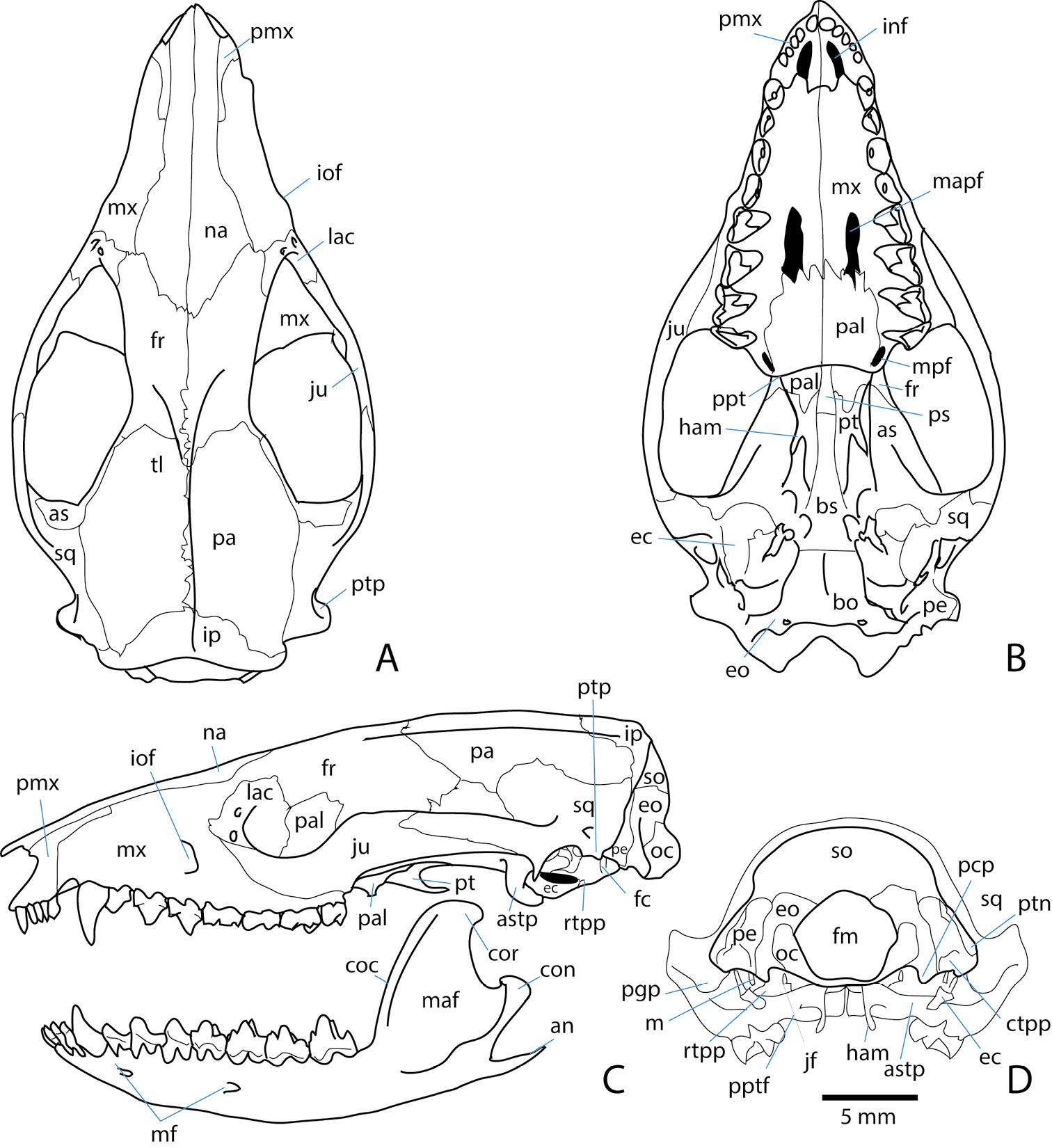
Northern red-sided opossum skull

Body length is 11–14 cm (4 1/4–5 1/2 in). Tail length is 4.5–6.5 cm (1 3/4–2 1/2 in). They are red-legged mouse like marsupials that weigh anywhere between 67 and 95 g. There is no recognizable sexual dimorphism between the males and females, though the males are slightly larger than the females. The distinctive feature of the M. brevicaudata is the short, dense, grey or black fur they on their dorsal side with red fur on the lateral side that continues down to the feet.

== Habitat ==
They are found in the rainforest, typically in mature, secondary rainforest. plantations, or gardens, including the edges of clearings. It is not as often found in dry deciduous forests. They reside in shrubby areas with lots of vegetation and often are found in the hollows of trees. Being in this environment also exposes them to their predators such as owls, coyotes, foxes and bobcats. It is regularly found up at 1,2000m in elevation.

== Behavior ==
Life span in the wild is unknown but in captivity they are live, on average, about 3.9 years. They live in forested areas, but are poor climbers and stay on the forest floor. They are nocturnal and during the day they stay in nests in hollow logs or tree trunks and are active during twilight. Their diet consists of seeds, shoots and fruits, carrion, insects such as cockroaches, crickets and spiders, and some small rodents. Rodents are killed with a powerful bite in the back of the head.

== Reproduction ==
They are polygynous and become sexually mature at around 4 to 5 months. The males in the groups may be violent and fight one another for territory and mates. There are 7 young born per litter, and if healthy enough, females can have 4 litters per year. Breeding season is typically from May to August, but are seen to be similar to that of Monodelphis domestica. It is speculated that the females may show some form of parental care since they need to care for the young after birth for about 50 days. The pouch of the M. brevicaudata is not as developed as in other marsupials. The young cling to the mother's fur and nipples and ride on her back when they are old enough to hold on. The shape of the urethral grooves of the males' genitalia is used to distinguish between Monodelphis brevicaudata, Monodelphis domestica, and Monodelphis americana. The grooves form 2 separate channels that form the ventral and dorsal folds of the erectile tissue.

== Taxonomy ==
M. brevicaudata was previously thought to have been a member of Monodelphis glirina. After close examination and gene sequence studies in 2010, it was determined that there were actually three different species in the Bolivian area: M. brevicaudata and M.domestica.
