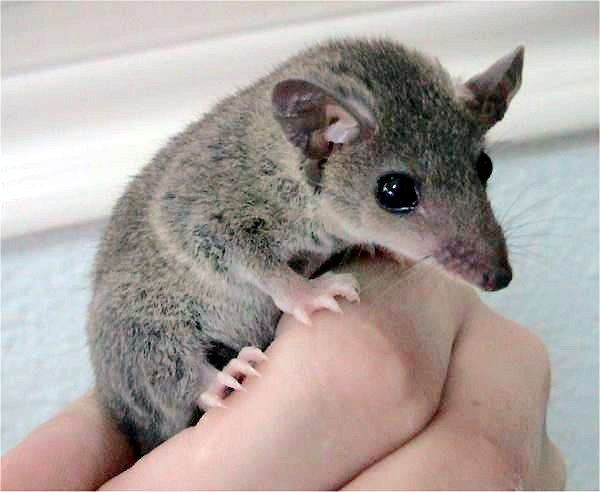
- Gray short-tailed opossum (Monodelphis domestica)

Scientific classification
- Kingdom: Animalia
- Phylum: Chordata
- Class: Mammalia
- Infraclass: Marsupialia
- Order: Didelphimorphia
- Family: Didelphidae
- Tribe: Marmosini
- Genus: Monodelphis; Burnett, 1830

Type species
- Monodelphis brachyura Burnett, 1830 (= Didelphis brevicaudata Erxleben, 1777)

Species
- See text

Synonyms
- Peramys Lesson 1842; Monodelphiops Matschie 1916; Hemiurus Gervais 1855; Minuania Cabrera 1919

= Short-tailed opossum =

Short-tailed opossums

Genus of mammals

Monodelphis is a genus of marsupials in the family Didelphidae, commonly referred to as short-tailed opossums. They are found throughout South America. The genus includes a model organism (M. domestica) and one of the few semelparous mammals (M. dimidiata). As of January 2019, the most recently described species is M. vossi.

== Species ==
- Sepia short-tailed opossum (Monodelphis adusta (Thomas 1897) Cabrera & Yepes 1940)
- Northern three-striped opossum (Monodelphis americana (Müller 1776) Pohle 1927)
- Arlindo's short-tailed opossum (Monodelphis arlindoi Pavan, Rossi & Schneider 2012)
- Northern red-sided opossum (Monodelphis brevicaudata (Erxleben 1777) Thomas 1920c)
- Yellow-sided opossum (Monodelphis dimidiata (Wagner 1847) Thomas 1924c)
- Gray short-tailed opossum (Monodelphis domestica (Wagner 1842) Pohle 1927)
- Emilia's short-tailed opossum (Monodelphis emiliae (Thomas 1912) Thomas 1920c)
- Gardner's short-tailed opossum (Monodelphis gardneri Solari et al. 2012)
- Amazonian red-sided opossum (Monodelphis glirina (Wagner 1842))
- Handley's short-tailed opossum (Monodelphis handleyi Solari 2007)
- Ihering's three-striped opossum (Monodelphis iheringi (Thomas 1888) Vieira 1950)
- Pygmy short-tailed opossum (Monodelphis kunsi Pine 1975)
- Marajó short-tailed opossum (Monodelphis maraxina Thomas 1923)
- Osgood's short-tailed opossum (Monodelphis osgoodi (Doutt 1938) Handley 1966c)
- Hooded red-sided opossum (Monodelphis palliolata (Osgood 1914) Pittier & Tate 1932)
- Peruvian short-tailed opossum (Monodelphis peruviana (Osgood 1913) Cabrera & Yepes 1940)
- Long-nosed short-tailed opossum (Monodelphis pinocchio Pavan 2015)
- Reig's opossum (Monodelphis reigi Lew & Pérez-Hernández 2004)
- Ronald's opossum (Monodelphis ronaldi Solari 2004)
- Chestnut-striped opossum (Monodelphis rubida (Thomas 1899) Pine & Handley 1984)
- Saci short-tailed opossum (Monodelphis saci Pavan, Mendes-Oliveira & Voss 2017)
- Santa Rosa short-tailed opossum (Monodelphis sanctaerosae Voss, Pine & Solari 2012)
- Long-nosed short-tailed opossum (Monodelphis scalops (Thomas 1888) Pohle 1927)
- Southern red-sided opossum (Monodelphis sorex (Hensel 1872) Cabrera & Yepes 1940)
- Southern three-striped opossum (Monodelphis theresa Thomas 1921)
- Touan short-tailed opossum (Monodelphis touan (Shaw 1800) Cabrera & Yepes 1940)
- Red three-striped opossum (Monodelphis umbristriata (Miranda-Ribeiro 1936) Vieira 1955)
- One-striped opossum (Monodelphis unistriata (Wagner 1842) Cabrera & Yepes 1940)
- Voss's short-tailed opossum (Monodelphis vossi Pavan 2019)

Species limits are based on fur coloration with additional details coming from differences in the skull and teeth.

== Behavior ==
Short-tailed opossums show a rich repertoire of stereotyped behaviors. Postures, locomotion, and grooming behaviours are similar to those of other didelphids. They also can carry nest materials using their short prehensile tails.

Short-tailed opossums show specialized behaviors for dealing with challenging prey. For example, attacks and initial consumption of large insects are initially directed to the insect's head, hairy caterpillars are scratched to get rid of the urticating hairs, and mice are attacked using a throat clamp technique.

== Chemosensory communication ==
Short-tailed opossums have been found to use nuzzling in chemosensory and exploratory behavior for recognizing individuals of the same species. In Monodelphis domestica, nuzzling and snout-rubbing transforms odor from dry components like glandular secretions, feces, and urine, into moist naso-oral secretions that reach the vomeronasal organ to be processed chemically. Typically, this behavior is used to recognize individual familiar or new scents from the same species, with males typically being drawn to more novel scents from the same species.

== Reproduction ==
The genus Monodelphis is marsupial; they are born under-developed and then mature further in the mother's pouch. In Monodelphis, the young first come off the teat in 12 days, whereas this occurs at 48 days in the related genus Didelphis. Most of the events in this process occur about 2–4 weeks later in Didelphis than in Monodelphis. This may be related to the shorter longevity of the species of Monodelphis compared to other marsupials who nurse for a longer period. M. dimidiata is unusual in that it is a semelparous species, something rarely seen in mammals, being found predominantly in smaller didelphids and dasyurids.
