= Saci short-tailed opossum =

Scientific classification
- Kingdom: Animalia
- Phylum: Chordata
- Class: Mammalia
- Infraclass: Marsupialia
- Order: Didelphimorphia
- Family: Didelphidae
- Genus: Monodelphis
- Species: M. saci

Binomial name
- Monodelphis saci Pavan, Mendes-Oliveira & Voss, 2017

Species of marsupial

The Saci short-tailed opossum (Monodelphis saci), also known as the gnome opossum, is a species of opossum endemic to the rainforests of Brazil.

== Characteristics ==
They measure 9 to 12 centimetres (3.5 to 4.7 in) from their nose to the base of the tail. The tail measures 4 to 6 centimetres (1.6 to 2.4 in). They weigh around 17 to 30 grams (0.60 to 1.06 oz). They have a conspicuous reddish head and brown rump and back. The chin, throat, groin and flanks are grayish-brown. There is a distinct central white streak on the chest and abdomen. Their paws are covered with short, light-brown hairs. Males are slightly larger than females.

== Distribution ==
They live in the lowland rainforests along the south bank of the Brazilian Amazon.

== Behavior ==
Little is known about their behavior because of their very recent discovery.

== Etymology ==
They are named after mythical creatures called Saci in Brazilian folklore which wear a red hat to disappear and reappear at will. Scientists named them so because of their reddish-heads and the fact they eluded discovery for so long.
