= Osgood's short-tailed opossum =

Conservation status
- Least Concern (IUCN 3.1)

Scientific classification
- Kingdom: Animalia
- Phylum: Chordata
- Class: Mammalia
- Infraclass: Marsupialia
- Order: Didelphimorphia
- Family: Didelphidae
- Genus: Monodelphis
- Species: M. osgoodi

Binomial name
- Monodelphis osgoodi Doutt, 1938
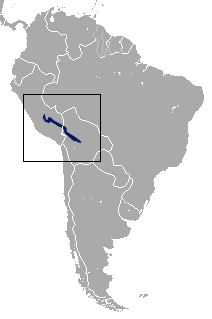
- Osgood's short-tailed opossum range

Species of marsupial

Osgood's short-tailed opossum (Monodelphis osgoodi) is a species of opossum in the family Didelphidae. It is found in Bolivia and Peru. Its natural habitats are subtropical or tropical moist lowland forest and subtropical or tropical dry lowland grassland. It is threatened by habitat loss. The opossum is named after American zoologist W. H. Osgood.
