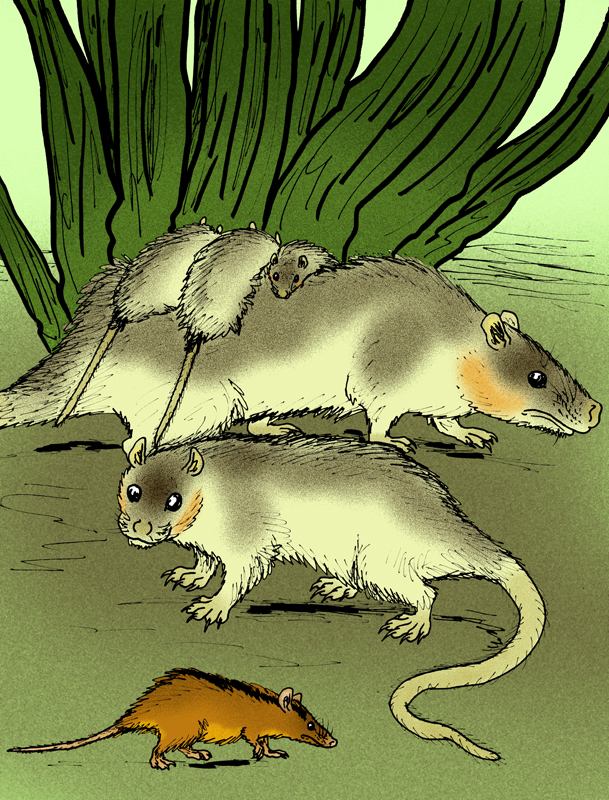
- Adult and juvenile T. lorenzinii compared to Didelphis crucialis

Scientific classification
- Domain: Eukaryota
- Kingdom: Animalia
- Phylum: Chordata
- Class: Mammalia
- Infraclass: Marsupialia
- Order: Didelphimorphia
- Family: Didelphidae
- Subfamily: Didelphinae
- Genus: Thylophorops; Reig, 1952

Type species
- †Thylophorops chapadmalensis Ameghino, 1908

Species
- †Thylophorops chapalmalensis; †Thylophorops lorenzinii; †Thylophorops perplana/perplanus

= Thylophorops =

Thylophorops Temporal range: Pliocene (Huayquerian-Uquian) ~5–2.6 Ma

Extinct genus of marsupials

Thylophorops is an extinct genus of didelphine opossums from the Pliocene of South America. Compared to their close didelphine cousins like the living Philander and Didelphis (and like the still living Lutreolina) opossums, Thylophorops displays specialization towards carnivory, and one species, T. lorenzinii, is the largest known opossum of all time, which could imply a macropredatory role.

== Taxonomy ==
Thylophorops is rather consistently recovered as a didelphine opossum, most often compared to and usually falling within the Didelphis, Philander and Lutreolina group. Within Thylophorops itself, there are three recognized species:

- Thylophorops chapadmalensis: The type species, known from the Pliocene (Chapadmalalan) Chapadmalal Formation and other (up to Uquian) formations in Argentina. It is known from a variety of skeletal remains, rendering it a fairly common species in the area. It is a large opossum species, comparable to the modern Virginia opossum in size.
- Thylophorops lorenzinii: Currently known only from the holotype MLP 08-III-10-1, a lower jaw and skull fragment, coming from Late Pliocene deposits in Buenos Aires. It represents a juvenile individual, estimated to weight around 7–8.6 kilograms (15–19 lb), making it the largest known didelphid of all time.
- Thylophorops perplana/perplanus: The earliest known species, occurring in Early Pliocene Argentinian deposits.

== Biology ==
Thylophorops species (as well as several other contemporary opossum genera) show a high degree of speciation towards carnivory compared to most living didelphines. Their premolar and molar teeth were proportionally larger than those of living opossums and their grinding facets imply a more dedicated shearing action; these have been interpreted as "omnivory leading towards carnivory" and as more specialized carnivory in posterior studies. There is evidence that T. chapadmalensis re-appropriated burrows from other digging mammals, as well as outright consuming them. Thylophorops species as a whole tended to be terrestrial rather than arboreal.

== Paleoecology ==
Thylophorops lived at a time when South America's older predatory guilds were dismantling. It co-existed with only a few sparassodont and phorusrhacid taxa like Thylacosmilus and Llallawavis, and it, as well as similar opossum species, evolved to fill the ecological blanks. A similar case is observed with the carnivorous armadillo Macroeuphractus, a product of this same era of faunal turn-overs.

As mentioned above, there is evidence of T. chapadmalensis predating on contemporary caviomorphs and appropriating burrows, from them or other mammals such as armadillos.
