= Ihering's three-striped opossum =

Conservation status
- Data Deficient (IUCN 3.1)

Scientific classification
- Kingdom: Animalia
- Phylum: Chordata
- Class: Mammalia
- Infraclass: Marsupialia
- Order: Didelphimorphia
- Family: Didelphidae
- Genus: Monodelphis
- Species: M. iheringi

Binomial name
- Monodelphis iheringi (Thomas, 1888)
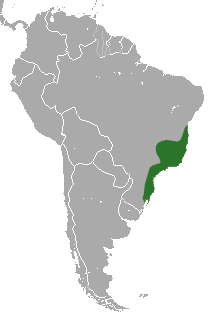
- Ihering's three-striped opossum range

Species of marsupial

Ihering's three-striped opossum (Monodelphis iheringi) is an opossum species found in Brazil.
