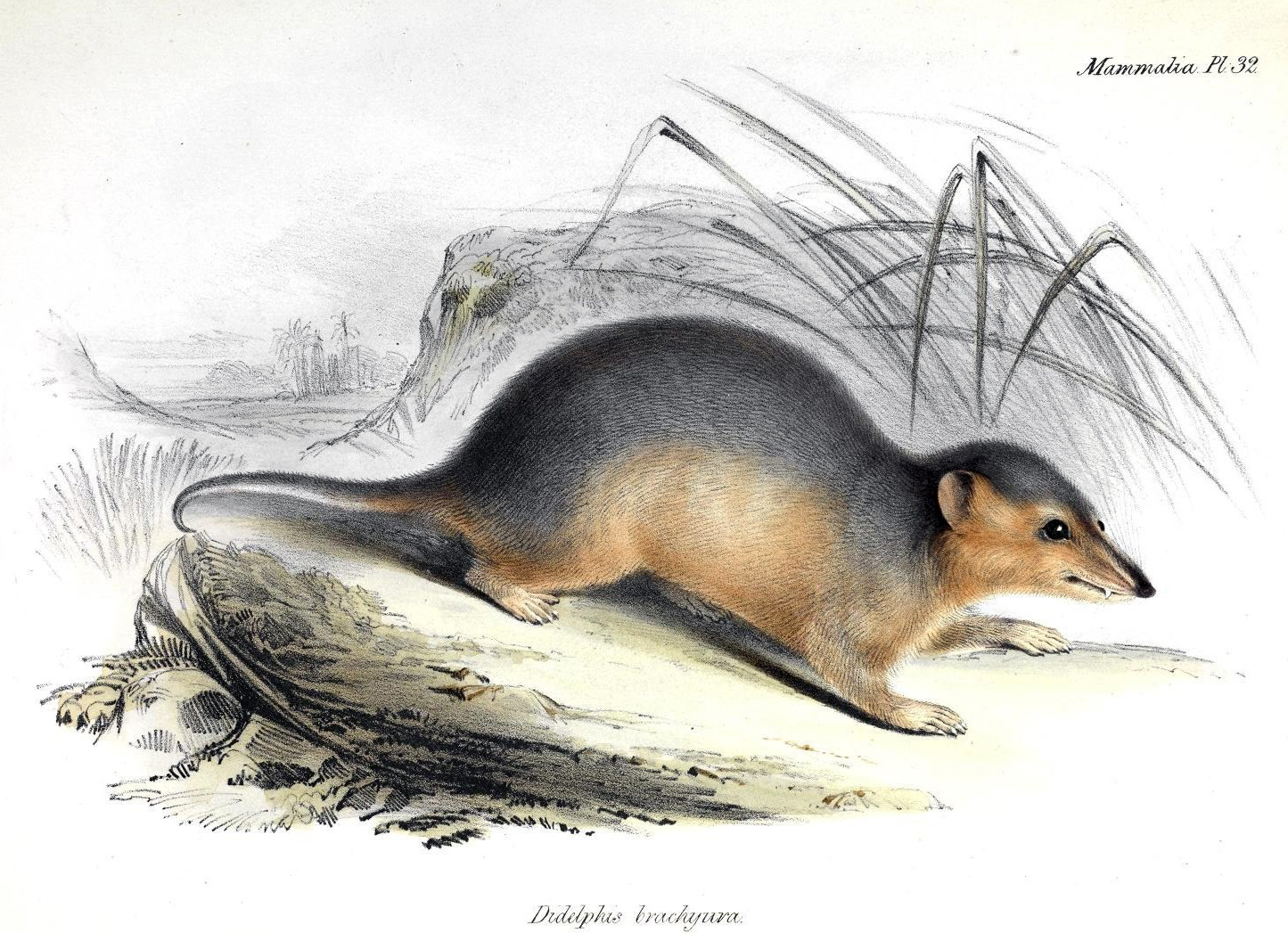

Conservation status
- Least Concern (IUCN 3.1)

Scientific classification
- Kingdom: Animalia
- Phylum: Chordata
- Class: Mammalia
- Infraclass: Marsupialia
- Order: Didelphimorphia
- Family: Didelphidae
- Genus: Monodelphis
- Species: M. dimidiata

Binomial name
- Monodelphis dimidiata (Wagner, 1847)
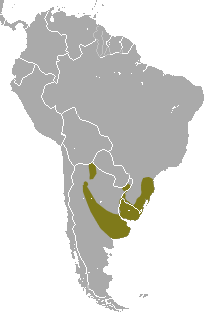
- Yellow-sided opossum range

= Yellow-sided opossum =

Species of marsupial

The yellow-sided opossum (Monodelphis dimidiata) is an opossum species from South America found in Argentina, Brazil and Uruguay. They have grey fur on their dorsal side with orangish fur on the lateral side that continues down to the feet. It is one of the few semelparous mammals in the word, as it breeds only once during its short annual life cycle. Preserving native grasslands is important for their conservation. They show marked sexual dimorphism: adult males are much larger (100-150 g versus 30-70 g in females) and show large and exposed canine teeth.

== Behavior ==
This species displays a rich repertoire of stereotyped behaviors. Postures, locomotion, and grooming are similar to those of other didelphids. They carry nest materials using their short but still prehensile tails.

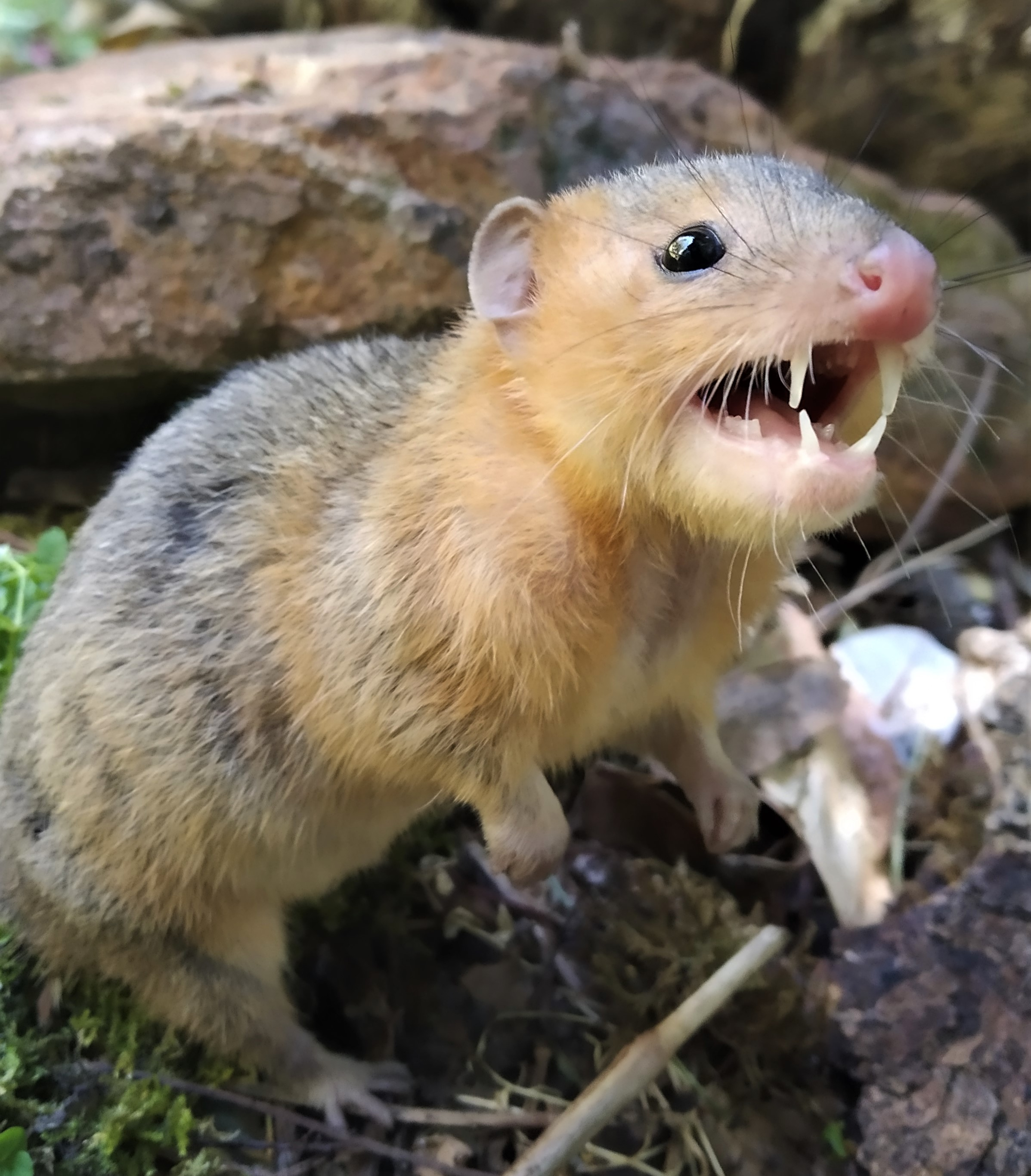
An opossum exposing its teeth

Both males and females hunt insects and small vertebrates, and show specialized behaviors for dealing with difficult prey. Large insects are attacked rapidly and the head is consumed first. In contrast, hairy caterpillars are not immediately grabbed; instead, the opossum scratches the caterpillar to get rid of the urticating hair. Small mice are rapidly chased and attacked until a firm bite at the neck is attained, similar to the throat clamp used by large carnivores.

M. dimidiata has been proposed to be a miniature analog to the marsupial sabertooths Thylacosmilus. Like extinct sabertooth predators, it has one of the largest canines of any marsupial relative to body size and was proposed as a living model to test hypotheses about hunting strategies of the extinct predators.

Yellow-sided opossums also show a variety of behaviors used in social contexts, including male-to-male agonistic rituals, and a variety of vocalizations whose social or adaptive significance deserves further investigation.

The species is one of the few mammals in the world that shows an annual semelparous life history. Immatures are found during autumn and winter; they reach sexual maturity in spring, when mating occurs, and lactating females are found in the summer. Most adults die by mid-autumn.
