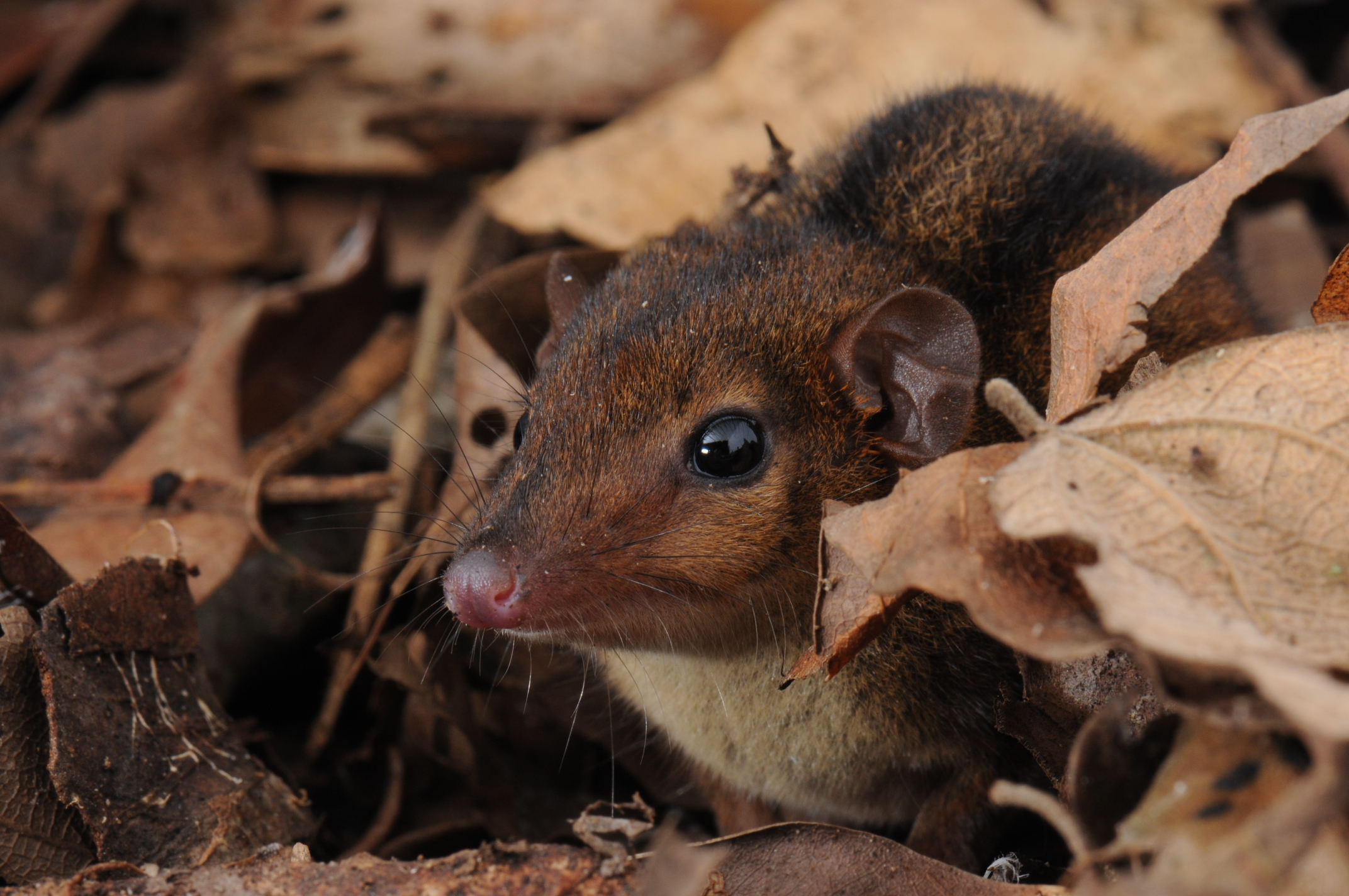

Conservation status
- Least Concern (IUCN 3.1)

Scientific classification
- Kingdom: Animalia
- Phylum: Chordata
- Class: Mammalia
- Infraclass: Marsupialia
- Order: Didelphimorphia
- Family: Didelphidae
- Genus: Monodelphis
- Species: M. americana

Binomial name
- Monodelphis americana (Müller, 1776)
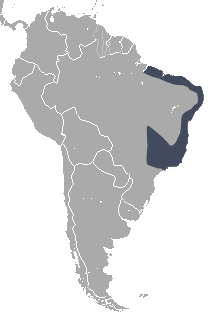
- Northern three-striped opossum range

= Northern three-striped opossum =

Species of marsupial

The northern three-striped opossum (Monodelphis americana) is an opossum species from South America.

It is endemic to Atlantic Forest ecoregions of coastal Brazil.
