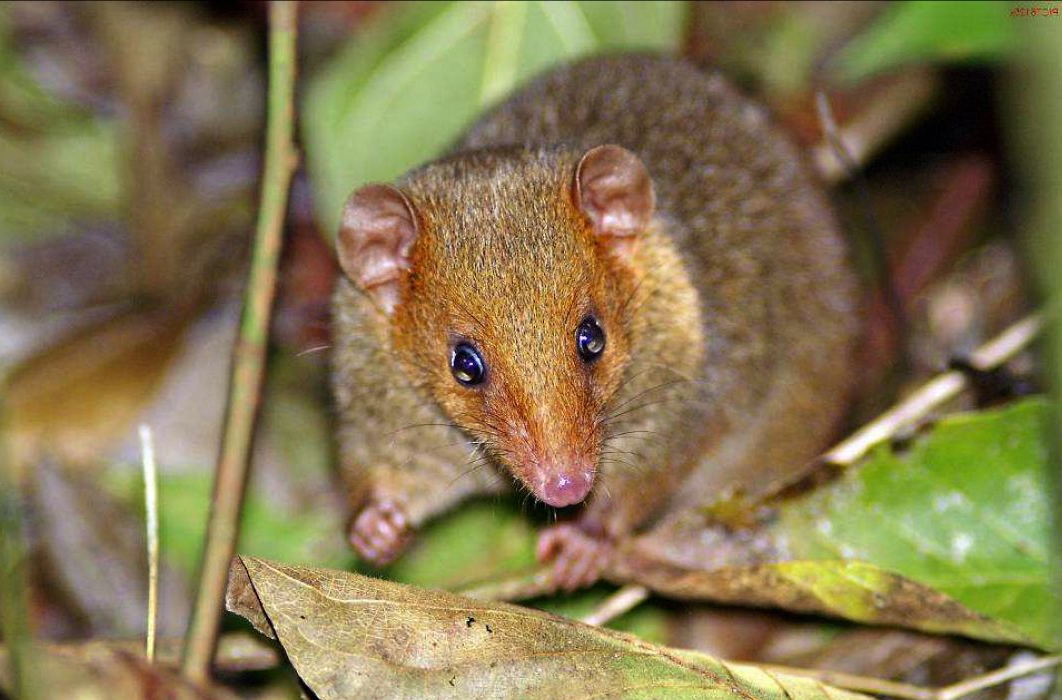

Conservation status
- Least Concern (IUCN 3.1)

Scientific classification
- Kingdom: Animalia
- Phylum: Chordata
- Class: Mammalia
- Infraclass: Marsupialia
- Order: Didelphimorphia
- Family: Didelphidae
- Genus: Monodelphis
- Species: M. scalops

Binomial name
- Monodelphis scalops (Thomas, 1888)
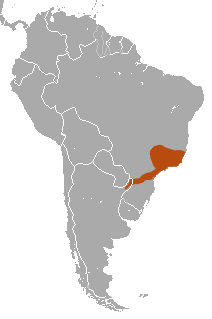
- Long-nosed short-tailed opossum range

= Long-nosed short-tailed opossum =

Species of marsupial

The long-nosed short-tailed opossum (Monodelphis scalops) is an opossum species in Argentina and Brazil.
