= Sepia short-tailed opossum =

Conservation status
- Least Concern (IUCN 3.1)

Scientific classification
- Kingdom: Animalia
- Phylum: Chordata
- Class: Mammalia
- Infraclass: Marsupialia
- Order: Didelphimorphia
- Family: Didelphidae
- Genus: Monodelphis
- Species: M. adusta

Binomial name
- Monodelphis adusta (Thomas, 1897)
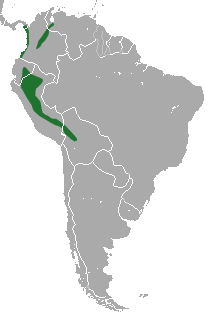
- Sepia short-tailed opossum range

Species of marsupial

The sepia short-tailed opossum (Monodelphis adusta) is a species of opossum in the family Didelphidae found in Colombia, Ecuador, Panama, Peru and Venezuela.

== Description ==
The species has dark brown fur and is distinct from other members of its genus by having no streaks on its trunk.

== Taxonomic notes ==
The Peruvian short-tailed opossum (Monodelphis peruviana; Osgood, 1913) was at one point included under this species.

== Ecology ==
Its habitat consists of different types of forests up to 2200 meters above sea level, as well as grasslands. These areas have about 5 m annual rainfall, so they find ways to remain above the water. The opossum hunts invertebrates on the ground, but remains of beetles and small frogs have also been seen. They are nocturnal and live in tree holes.
