= Pygmy short-tailed opossum =

Conservation status
- Least Concern (IUCN 3.1)

Scientific classification
- Kingdom: Animalia
- Phylum: Chordata
- Class: Mammalia
- Infraclass: Marsupialia
- Order: Didelphimorphia
- Family: Didelphidae
- Genus: Monodelphis
- Species: M. kunsi

Binomial name
- Monodelphis kunsi Pine, 1975
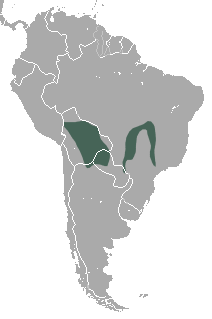
- Pygmy short-tailed opossum range

Species of marsupial

The pygmy short-tailed opossum (Monodelphis kunsi), is an opossum species from South America. M. kunsi is a marsupial from the family Didelphidae of the order Didelphimorphia. Although it is a marsupial, it lacks the characteristic pouch that is often associated with this order. It is found in Argentina, Bolivia, Brazil and Paraguay. M. kunsi is considered a smaller species within the family Didelphidae, which is why it is named a pygmy opossum. The young are referred to as 'joeys'. The females are referred to as 'Jill,' and the males 'jack'. It was thought to have been endangered in 2001, but has since been moved to least concern by the International Union for Conservation of Nature.

== Morphological characteristics ==
Monodelphis kunsi is a relatively small opossum with short, warm-brown hair on its dorsal side. The ventral side of this pygmy opossum is a lighter color with pale, ivory patches of fur mixed throughout. In addition to fur, vibrissae can be found in three locations on the face, including the nose, above the eyes and near the ears, and under the chin. M. kunsi lacks a mid-sagittal crest; however, it does have a throat gland present. Compared to other opossums, the rostrum of M. kunsi is less protruded than some other opossums, but it is still recognizable as a character of the genera Monodelphis and Didelphis. M. kunsi has an approximate body mass of 19 grams, with a body length ranging from 71–94 mm long, and a relatively short tail from 41–42 mm in length. The tail is, to at least some degree, prehensile, and it is covered with very small hairs. The tail is hairless at the tip, which is seen in many members of the Short-tailed opossum genus. It is also thought to be used for tactile purposes.

== Distribution and habitat ==
Monodelphis kunsi is a terrestrial marsupial that inhabits a wide range of habitats within South America. It has been documented in southern and eastern parts of Bolivia, eastern Paraguay, western, central and southeastern Brazil, and in the northern parts of Argentina. It is thought that due to the species wide and fragmented distribution that the specimens documented as M. kunsi may actually be a complex of species. A study conducted by Caceres et al. from the year 2000 to 2008 documented M. kunsi at all altitudes of two designated localities in the Urucum Mountains of western Brazil. The study monitored altitudes ranging from 150 meters to over 1000 meters. The findings suggested that while the opossum was found at all altitudes, it is a grassland specialist in that region. M. kunsi is also found in the Rio Lipeo department of Tarija, Bolivia, which is between 200 m and 640 m in elevation. They are generally encountered in shrub forests of 6–12 m in height in Paraguay. M. kunsi is found in a variety of habitats ranging from forested or wooded areas, to dry Cerrado savannahs, and even Amazonian rain forest.

== Ecology and behavior ==
Monodelphis kunsi is still a relatively unknown species with few publications on its behavior and ecology. The species is thought to be insectivorous due to their occlusal dentition, general skull shape, and skull size. M. kunsi lacks enlarged canines, and their posterior incisors are bigger than their first upper pair of incisors. When it comes to being preyed upon, one study documented M. kunsi as a lesser choice of prey by the maned wolf - Chrysocyon brachyurus, the American barn owl - Tyto furcata, and the burrowing owl - Athene cunicularia in a savannah preserve located in southeastern Brazil. Little is known about the reproductive behaviors in M. kunsi; however, other Monodelphis species are known to be semelparous breeders, so it possible that this species is as well. More research is needed to understand the basic reproductive behavior of M. kunsi before any assumptions can be made.
