= List of didelphimorphs =

Species in mammal order Didelphimorphia

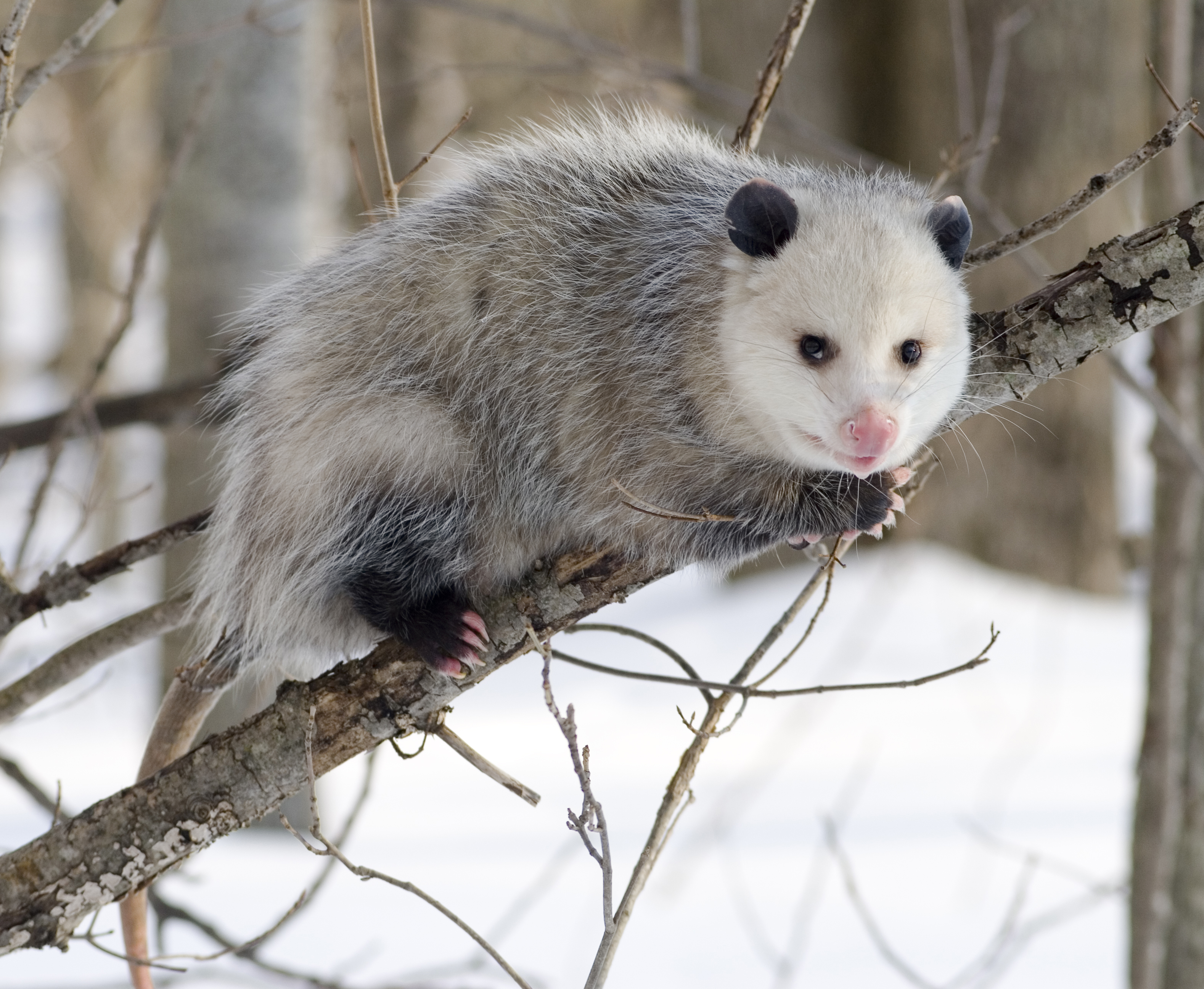
Virginia opossum (Didelphis virginiana)

Didelphimorphia is an order of marsupial mammals. Members of this order are called didelphimorphs, or opossums. They are primarily found in South America, though some are found in Central America and Mexico and one, the Virginia opossum, ranges into the United States and Canada. They have a variety of sizes, shapes, and fur patterns, and range in size from the 6 cm (2 in) (plus 9 cm (4 in) tail) Kalinowski's mouse opossum to the 55 cm (22 in) (plus 54 cm (21 in) tail) Virginia opossum. Didelphimorphs are primarily found in forests, as well as savannas, shrublands, and grasslands. Almost no population estimates have been made for didelphimorph species, though the one-striped opossum is classified as Critically Endangered with a population of less than ten, Handley's slender opossum is also critically endangered, and the red-bellied gracile opossum is extinct, having last been seen in 1962.

The 92 extant species of Didelphimorphia are grouped into a single family, Didelphidae, which is divided into four subfamilies: Caluromyinae, containing four species in two genera; Glironiinae, containing a single species; Hyladelphinae, also with a single species; and Didelphinae, containing 86 species split between 14 genera. Over one hundred extinct Didelphimorph species have been discovered, though due to ongoing research and discoveries the exact number and categorization is not fixed.

== Conventions ==
IUCN Red List categories
Conservation status
- EX: Extinct (1 species)
- EW: Extinct in the wild (0 species)
- CR: Critically endangered (2 species)
- EN: Endangered (0 species)
- VU: Vulnerable (5 species)
- NT: Near threatened (4 species)
- LC: Least concern (67 species)

Other categories
- DD: Data deficient (14 species)
- NE: Not evaluated (0 species)

The author citation for the species or genus is given after the scientific name; parentheses around the author citation indicate that this was not the original taxonomic placement. Conservation status codes listed follow the International Union for Conservation of Nature (IUCN) Red List of Threatened Species. Range maps are provided wherever possible; if a range map is not available, a description of the didelphimorph's range is provided. Ranges are based on the IUCN Red List for that species unless otherwise noted. All extinct species or subspecies listed alongside extant species went extinct after 1500 CE, and are indicated by a dagger symbol "†".

== Classification ==
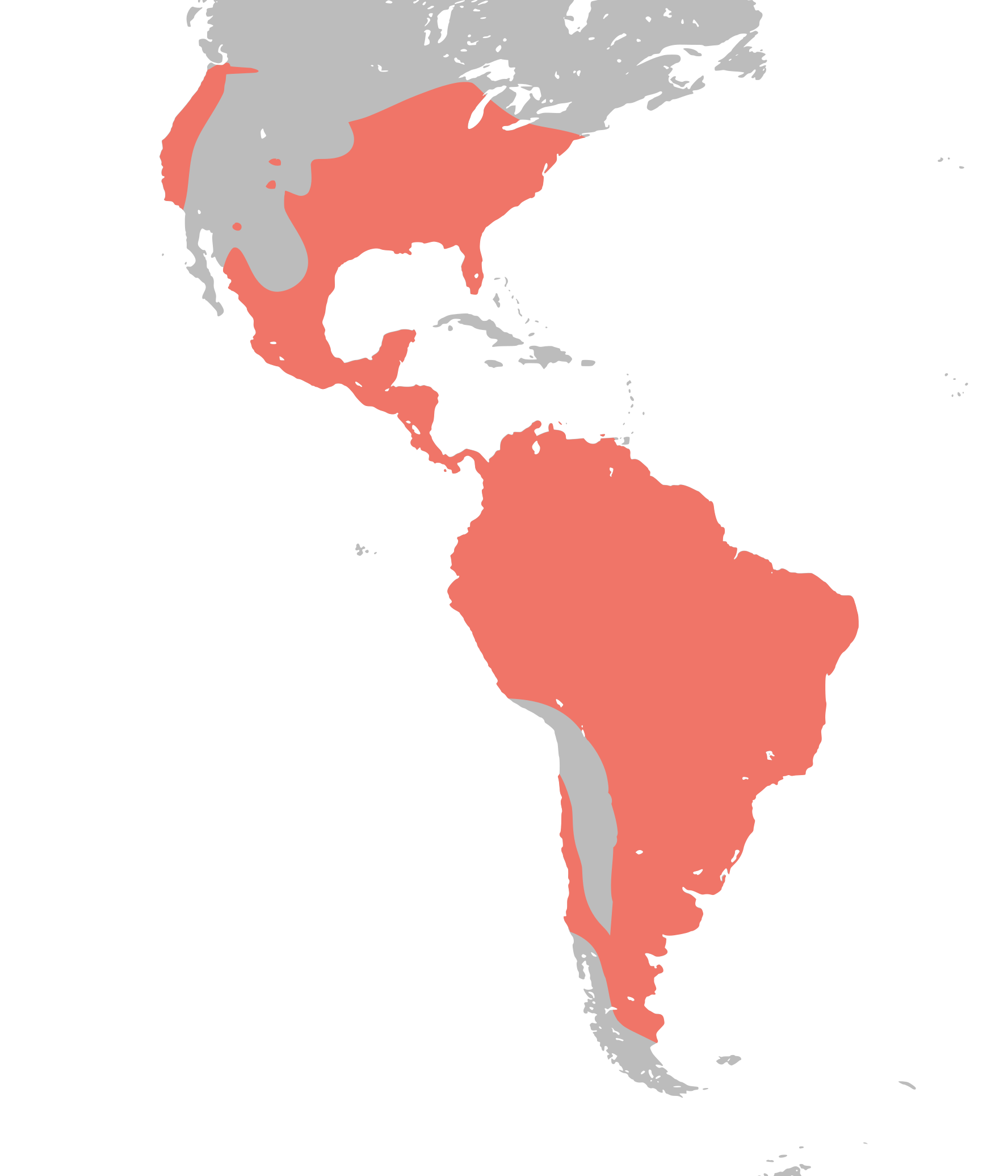
Didelphidae distribution

The order Didelphimorphia consists of one family, Didelphidae, which is divided into the subfamilies Caluromyinae, Glironiinae, Hyladelphinae, and Didelphinae. Caluromyinae contains 4 species in 2 genera, Glironiinae and Hyladelphinae each contain a single species, and Didelphinae contains 86 extant species in 14 genera, as well as the extinct red-bellied gracile opossum, which was last seen in 1962. Many of these species are further subdivided into subspecies. This does not include hybrid species or extinct prehistoric species.

Family Didelphidae

- Subfamily Caluromyinae
  - Genus Caluromys (woolly opossums): three species
  - Genus Caluromysiops (black-shouldered opossum): one species
- Subfamily Didelphinae
  - Genus Chacodelphys (Chacoan pygmy opossum): one species
  - Genus Chironectes (water opossum): one species
  - Genus Cryptonanus (slender mouse opossums): five species (one extinct)
  - Genus Didelphis (large American opossums): six species
  - Genus Gracilinanus (gracile opossums): six species
  - Genus Lestodelphys (Patagonian opossum): one species
  - Genus Lutreolina (lutrine opossums): two species
  - Genus Marmosa (mouse opossums): fifteen species
  - Genus Marmosops (slender opossums): seventeen species
  - Genus Metachirus: (brown four-eyed opossums): one species
  - Genus Monodelphis (short-tailed opossums): seventeen species
  - Genus Philander (gray and black four-eyed opossums): five species
  - Genus Thylamys (fat-tailed mouse opossums): nine species
  - Genus Tlacuatzin (gray mouse opossums): one species
- Subfamily Glironiinae
  - Genus Glironia (bushy-tailed opossum): one species
- Subfamily Hyladelphinae
  - Genus Hyladelphys (Kalinowski's mouse opossum): one species

- Didelphidae
  - - Caluromyinae
      - Caluromysiops
      - Caluromys
  - - - Glironiinae
        Glironia
    - - Hyladelphinae
        Hyladelphys
      - Didelphinae
        - - - Tlacuatzin
            - Marmosa
          - Monodelphis
        - - - Metachirus
            - - Chironectes
              - - Lutreolina
                - - Philander
                  - Didelphis
          - - Marmosops
            - - Cryptonanus
              - - Gracilinanus
                - - Lestodelphys
                  - Thylamys

== Didelphimorphs ==
The following classification is based on the taxonomy described by Mammal Species of the World (2005), with augmentation by generally accepted proposals made since using molecular phylogenetic analysis, as supported by both the IUCN and the American Society of Mammalogists.

=== Subfamily Caluromyinae ===
Genus Caluromys – Allen, 1900 – three species
Common name	Scientific name and subspecies	Range	Size and ecology	IUCN status and estimated population
Bare-tailed woolly opossum	C. philander (Linnaeus, 1758) Four subspecies: C. p. affinis; C. p. dichurus; C. p. philander; C. p. trinitatis	Eastern and northeastern South America	Size: 16–28 cm (6–11 in) long, plus 25–41 cm (10–16 in) tail Habitat: Forest Diet: Fruit, as well as gum, nectar, small vertebrates, and invertebrates	LC Unknown
Brown-eared woolly opossum	C. lanatus (Olfers, 1818) Four subspecies: C. l. cicur; C. l. lanatus; C. l. ochropus; C. l. ornatus	Central and northwestern South America	Size: 20–32 cm (8–13 in) long, plus 33–44 cm (13–17 in) tail Habitat: Forest Diet: Fruit, invertebrates, and some small vertebrates, as well as nectar and flowers	LC Unknown
Derby's woolly opossum	C. derbianus (Waterhouse, 1841) Six subspecies: C. d. aztecus; C. d. centralis; C. d. derbianus; C. d. fervidus; C. d. nauticus; C. d. pallidus	Central American and northwestern South America	Size: 22–30 cm (9–12 in) long, plus 38–45 cm (15–18 in) tail Habitat: Forest Diet: Fruit, seeds, leaves, soft vegetables, insects, and other small invertebrates	LC Unknown

Genus Caluromysiops – Sanborn, 1951 – one species
Common name	Scientific name and subspecies	Range	Size and ecology	IUCN status and estimated population
Black-shouldered opossum	C. irrupta Sanborn, 1951	West-central South America	Size: 25–33 cm (10–13 in) long, plus 31–34 cm (12–13 in) tail Habitat: Forest Diet: Flowers and fruit, as well as small rodents	LC Unknown

=== Subfamily Didelphinae ===
Genus Chacodelphys – Voss et al., 2004 – one species
Common name	Scientific name and subspecies	Range	Size and ecology	IUCN status and estimated population
Chacoan pygmy opossum	C. formosa (Shamel, 1930)	Northeastern Argentina	Size: About 7 cm (3 in) long, plus 6 cm (2 in) tail Habitat: Shrubland Diet: Unknown	NT Unknown

Genus Chironectes – Illiger, 1811 – one species
Common name	Scientific name and subspecies	Range	Size and ecology	IUCN status and estimated population
Water opossum	C. minimus (Zimmermann, 1780) Four subspecies: C. m. argyrodytes; C. m. langsdorffi; C. m. minimus; C. m. panamensis	Central America, northern South America, southeastern South America	Size: 27–40 cm (11–16 in) long, plus 30–43 cm (12–17 in) tail Habitat: Forest and inland wetlands Diet: Fish, crabs, other crustaceans, and insects, as well as frogs	LC Unknown

Genus Cryptonanus – Voss et al., 2005 – five species
Common name	Scientific name and subspecies	Range	Size and ecology	IUCN status and estimated population
Agricola's gracile opossum	C. agricolai (Moojen, 1943)	Eastern Brazil	Size: 8–9 cm (3–4 in) long, plus 10–11 cm (4 in) tail Habitat: Forest and shrubland Diet: Unknown	DD Unknown
Chacoan gracile opossum	C. chacoensis (Tate, 1931)	Southern South America	Size: 8–10 cm (3–4 in) long, plus 9–13 cm (4–5 in) tail Habitat: Forest and grassland Diet: Unknown fruit and insects	LC Unknown
Guahiba gracile opossum	C. guahybae (Tate, 1931)	Southern Brazil	Size: About 9 cm (4 in) long, plus 11 cm (4 in) tail Habitat: Forest and grassland Diet: Unknown	DD Unknown
Red-bellied gracile opossum†	C. ignitus Díaz, Flores, Barquez, 2002	Northwestern Argentina	Size: About 11 cm (4 in) long, plus 12 cm (5 in) tail Habitat: Forest Diet: Unknown	EX Unknown
Unduavi gracile opossum	C. unduaviensis (Shamel, 1930)	Northern Bolivia	Size: 9–13 cm (4–5 in) long, plus 11–14 cm (4–6 in) tail Habitat: Forest, grassland, and inland wetlands Diet: Unknown	DD Unknown

Genus Didelphis – Linnaeus, 1758 – six species
Common name	Scientific name and subspecies	Range	Size and ecology	IUCN status and estimated population
Andean white-eared opossum	D. pernigra J. A. Allen, 1900	Northwestern South America	Size: 30–50 cm (12–20 in) long, plus 25–54 cm (10–21 in) tail Habitat: Forest, shrubland, and grassland Diet: Small vertebrates, carrion, invertebrates, and plants	LC Unknown
Big-eared opossum	D. aurita (Wied-Neuwied, 1826)	Eastern South America	Size: 30–50 cm (12–20 in) long, plus 25–54 cm (10–21 in) tail Habitat: Forest and shrubland Diet: Arthropods and fruit, as well as other invertebrates and small vertebrates	LC Unknown
Common opossum	D. marsupialis Linnaeus, 1758 Two subspecies: D. m. caucae; D. m. marsupialis	Central American and northern South America	Size: 26–43 cm (10–17 in) long, plus 40 cm (16 in) tail Habitat: Forest and shrubland Diet: Omnivorous; eats invertebrates, vertebrates, leaves, fruit, nectar, and carrion	LC Unknown
Guianan white-eared opossum	D. imperfecta Mondolfi, Hernández, 1984	Northern South America	Size: 30–50 cm (12–20 in) long, plus 25–54 cm (10–21 in) tail Habitat: Forest Diet: Omnivorous; primarily fruit and insects	LC Unknown
Virginia opossum	D. virginiana Kerr, 1792 Four subspecies: D. v. californica; D. v. pigra; D. v. virginiana; D. v. yucatanensis	North America and Central America	Size: 33–55 cm (13–22 in) long, plus 25–54 cm (10–21 in) tail Habitat: Forest and shrubland Diet: Omnivorous, including vertebrates, invertebrates, plant material, fruits, grains and carrion	LC Unknown
White-eared opossum	D. albiventris Lund, 1840	Eastern and southern South America	Size: 30–50 cm (12–20 in) long, plus 25–54 cm (10–21 in) tail Habitat: Forest, savanna, and shrubland Diet: Small vertebrates, carrion, invertebrates, and plants	LC Unknown

Genus Gracilinanus – Gardner, Creighton, 1989 – six species
Common name	Scientific name and subspecies	Range	Size and ecology	IUCN status and estimated population
Aceramarca gracile opossum	G. aceramarcae (Tate, 1931)	Western South America	Size: About 11 cm (4 in) long, plus 14 cm (6 in) tail Habitat: Forest Diet: Fruit, insects and other small invertebrates	LC Unknown
Agile gracile opossum	G. agilis (Burmeister, 1854)	Central South America	Size: 8–12 cm (3–5 in) long, plus 10–16 cm (4–6 in) tail Habitat: Forest Diet: Insects and fruit	LC Unknown
Brazilian gracile opossum	G. microtarsus (Wagner, 1842) Two subspecies: G. m. guahybae; G. m. microtarsus	Southeastern South America	Size: About 10 cm (4 in) long, plus 13 cm (5 in) tail Habitat: Forest Diet: Insects, other invertebrates, and fruit	LC Unknown
Emilia's gracile opossum	G. emiliae (Thomas, 1909)	Scattered northern South America	Size: About 8 cm (3 in) long, plus 14 cm (6 in) tail Habitat: Forest Diet: Believed to be insects and fruit	DD Unknown
Northern gracile opossum	G. marica (Thomas, 1898)	Northern South America	Size: About 10 cm (4 in) long, plus 13 cm (5 in) tail Habitat: Forest and grassland Diet: Believed to be insects and fruit	LC Unknown
Wood sprite gracile opossum	G. dryas (Thomas, 1898)	Northern South America	Size: About 11 cm (4 in) long, plus 14 cm (6 in) tail Habitat: Forest Diet: Believed to be insects and fruit	LC Unknown

Genus Lestodelphys – Tate, 1934 – one species
Common name	Scientific name and subspecies	Range	Size and ecology	IUCN status and estimated population
Patagonian opossum	L. halli (Thomas, 1921)	Southern South America	Size: 13–15 cm (5–6 in) long, plus 8–10 cm (3–4 in) tail Habitat: Shrubland, grassland, and desert Diet: Invertebrates, as well as birds, reptiles, and fruit	LC Unknown

Genus Lutreolina – Thomas, 1910 – two species
Common name	Scientific name and subspecies	Range	Size and ecology	IUCN status and estimated population
Big lutrine opossum	L. crassicaudata (Desmarest, 1804) Two subspecies: L. c. crassicaudata; L. c. turneri	Scattered South America (Massoia's lutrine opossum in red)	Size: 26–35 cm (10–14 in) long, plus 24–30 cm (9–12 in) tail Habitat: Forest, grassland, and inland wetlands Diet: Omnivorous; crabs, beetles, amphibians, birds, seeds, and vegetation, as well as other invertebrates, fish, and small mammals	LC Unknown
Massoia's lutrine opossum	L. massoia Martínez-Lanfranco, Flores, Jayat, D'Elía, 2014	South-central South America (big lutrine opossum in green)	Size: 18–24 cm (7–9 in) long, plus 20–26 cm (8–10 in) tail Habitat: Forest and grassland Diet: Small mammals, fish, and invertebrates, as well as bird eggs and fruit	LC Unknown

Genus Marmosa – Gray, 1821 – fifteen species
Common name	Scientific name and subspecies	Range	Size and ecology	IUCN status and estimated population
Alston's mouse opossum	M. alstoni (Allen, 1900)	Central America, northwestern tip of South America	Size: 18–20 cm (7–8 in) long, plus 24–28 cm (9–11 in) tail Habitat: Forest Diet: Insects, small vertebrates, and fruit	LC Unknown
Bare-tailed woolly mouse opossum	M. regina Thomas, 1924	Western South America	Size: 15–21 cm (6–8 in) long, plus 21–30 cm (8–12 in) tail Habitat: Forest Diet: Insects and fruit, as well as nectar, small vertebrates, and eggs	LC Unknown
Guajira mouse opossum	M. xerophila Handley, Gordon, 1979	Northern South America	Size: 8–16 cm (3–6 in) long, plus 10–20 cm (4–8 in) tail Habitat: Forest and shrubland Diet: Insects and fruit, as well as lizards, bird eggs, and small rodents	VU Unknown
Heavy-browed mouse opossum	M. andersoni Pine, 1972	Peru	Size: 8–22 cm (3–9 in) long, plus 12–27 cm (5–11 in) tail Habitat: Forest Diet: Insects, as well as fruit	DD Unknown
Linnaeus's mouse opossum	M. murina (Linnaeus, 1758)	Northern and eastern South America	Size: 11–15 cm (4–6 in) long, plus 13–21 cm (5–8 in) tail Habitat: Forest Diet: Insects, small animals, and fruit	LC Unknown
Little woolly mouse opossum	M. phaea Thomas, 1899	Northwestern South America	Size: 8–22 cm (3–9 in) long, plus 12–27 cm (5–11 in) tail Habitat: Forest Diet: Insects and fruit, as well as nectar, small vertebrates, and eggs	NT Unknown
Mexican mouse opossum	M. mexicana Merriam, 1897 Three subspecies: M. m. mayensis; M. m. mexicana; M. m. savannarum	Mexico and Central America	Size: 9–17 cm (4–7 in) long, plus 13–23 cm (5–9 in) tail Habitat: Forest and grassland Diet: Insects and fruit, as well as small rodents, lizards, birds, and eggs	LC Unknown
Quechuan mouse opossum	M. quichua Wagner, 1842	Western South America	Size: 8–22 cm (3–9 in) long, plus 12–27 cm (5–11 in) tail Habitat: Forest Diet: Insects and fruit, as well as nectar, small vertebrates, and eggs	LC Unknown
Red mouse opossum	M. rubra Tate, 1931	Western South America	Size: 12–20 cm (5–8 in) long, plus 18–22 cm (7–9 in) tail Habitat: Forest Diet: Insects and fruit	DD Unknown
Robinson's mouse opossum	M. robinsoni Bangs, 1898 Six subspecies: M. r. chapmani; M. r. fulviventer; M. r. grenadae; M. r. luridavolta; M. r. robinsoni; M. r. ruatanica	Northern South America and Central America	Size: 8–22 cm (3–9 in) long, plus 10–22 cm (4–9 in) tail Habitat: Forest and savanna Diet: Fruit and insects	LC Unknown
Rufous mouse opossum	M. lepida (Thomas, 1888)	Northwestern South America	Size: 8–22 cm (3–9 in) long, plus 12–27 cm (5–11 in) tail Habitat: Forest Diet: Insects and fruit	LC Unknown
Tate's woolly mouse opossum	M. paraguayana Tate, 1931 Two subspecies: M. p. paraguayana; M. p. travassosi	Southeastern South America	Size: 8–22 cm (3–9 in) long, plus 12–27 cm (5–11 in) tail Habitat: Forest Diet: Omnivorous and insectivorous	LC Unknown
Tyler's mouse opossum	M. tyleriana Tate, 1931	Northern South America	Size: 8–22 cm (3–9 in) long, plus 12–27 cm (5–11 in) tail Habitat: Forest Diet: Insects as well as fruit	DD Unknown
White-bellied woolly mouse opossum	M. constantiae Thomas, 1904	Central South America	Size: 8–22 cm (3–9 in) long, plus 12–27 cm (5–11 in) tail Habitat: Forest Diet: Insects and fruit, as well as nectar, small vertebrates, and eggs	LC Unknown
Woolly mouse opossum	M. demerarae Thomas, 1905 Four subspecies: M. d. areniticola; M. d. demerarae; M. d. dominus; M. d. esmeraldae	Northeastern South America	Size: 8–22 cm (3–9 in) long, plus 12–27 cm (5–11 in) tail Habitat: Forest Diet: Insects, small animals, fruit, and nectar	LC Unknown

Genus Marmosops – Matschie, 1916 – seventeen species
Common name	Scientific name and subspecies	Range	Size and ecology	IUCN status and estimated population
Andean Slender Mouse Opossum	M. caucae (Thomas, 1900)	Northwestern South America	Size: 9–17 cm (4–7 in) long, plus 10–22 cm (4–9 in) tail Habitat: Forest Diet: Insects and fruit	LC Unknown
Bishop's slender opossum	M. bishopi (Pine, 1981)	Central South America	Size: 9–12 cm (4–5 in) long, plus 11–16 cm (4–6 in) tail Habitat: Forest Diet: Insects and fruit	LC Unknown
Brazilian slender opossum	M. paulensis (Tate, 1931)	Southeastern Brazil	Size: 9–17 cm (4–7 in) long, plus 10–22 cm (4–9 in) tail Habitat: Forest Diet: Insects and fruit	LC Unknown
Creighton's slender opossum	M. creightoni Voss, Tarifa, Yensen, 2004	Zongo River valley in Bolivia	Size: 9–17 cm (4–7 in) long, plus 10–22 cm (4–9 in) tail Habitat: Forest Diet: Insects and fruit	DD Unknown
Delicate slender opossum	M. parvidens (Tate, 1931)	Northern South America	Size: 9–11 cm (4 in) long, plus 14–16 cm (6–6 in) tail Habitat: Forest Diet: Insects and fruit	LC Unknown
Dusky slender opossum	M. fuscatus (Thomas, 1896) Two subspecies: M. f. fuscatus; M. f. perfuscus	Northern South America	Size: 13–14 cm (5–6 in) long, plus 14–15 cm (6–6 in) tail Habitat: Forest Diet: Insects and fruit	DD Unknown
Gray slender opossum	M. incanus (Lund, 1841)	Eastern South America	Size: 9–17 cm (4–7 in) long, plus 10–22 cm (4–9 in) tail Habitat: Forest Diet: Insects and fruit	LC Unknown
Handley's slender opossum	M. handleyi (Pine, 1981)	Central Columbia	Size: 10–13 cm (4–5 in) long, plus 12–15 cm (5–6 in) tail Habitat: Forest Diet: Insects and fruit	CR Unknown
Junin slender opossum	M. juninensis (Tate, 1931)	Central Peru	Size: 9–11 cm (4 in) long, plus 12–14 cm (5–6 in) tail Habitat: Forest Diet: Insects and fruit	VU Unknown
Narrow-headed slender opossum	M. cracens Handley, Gordon, 1979	Northern South America	Size: 9–17 cm (4–7 in) long, plus 10–22 cm (4–9 in) tail Habitat: Forest Diet: Insects and fruit	DD Unknown
Neblina slender opossum	M. neblina Gardner, 1990	Northwestern South America	Size: 9–17 cm (4–7 in) long, plus 10–22 cm (4–9 in) tail Habitat: Forest Diet: Insects and fruit	LC Unknown
Panama slender opossum	M. invictus (Goldman, 1921)	Panama	Size: 10–12 cm (4–5 in) long, plus 12–15 cm (5–6 in) tail Habitat: Forest Diet: Insects and fruit	LC Unknown
Pantepui slender opossum	M. pakaraimae Voss, Lim, Díaz-Nieto, Jansa, 2013	Northern South America	Size: 10–12 cm (4–5 in) long, plus 15–17 cm (6–7 in) tail Habitat: Forest Diet: Insects and fruit	VU Unknown
Pinheiro's slender opossum	M. pinheiroi (Pine, 1981)	Northern South America	Size: 8–13 cm (3–5 in) long, plus 12–16 cm (5–6 in) tail Habitat: Forest Diet: Insects and fruit	LC Unknown
Spectacled slender opossum	M. ocellatus (Tate, 1931)	Bolivia	Size: 9–17 cm (4–7 in) long, plus 10–22 cm (4–9 in) tail Habitat: Forest Diet: Insects and fruit	LC Unknown
Tschudi's slender opossum	M. impavidus Tschudi, 1844	Northwestern South America	Size: 9–17 cm (4–7 in) long, plus 10–22 cm (4–9 in) tail Habitat: Forest Diet: Insects and fruit	LC Unknown
White-bellied slender opossum	M. noctivagus (Tschudi, 1844)	Western South America	Size: 9–17 cm (4–7 in) long, plus 10–22 cm (4–9 in) tail Habitat: Forest Diet: Insects and fruit	LC Unknown

Genus Metachirus – Burmeister, 1854 – one species
Common name	Scientific name and subspecies	Range	Size and ecology	IUCN status and estimated population
Brown four-eyed opossum	M. nudicaudatus (Geoffroy, 1803) Four subspecies: M. n. colombianus; M. n. modestus; M. n. nudicaudatus; M. n. tschudii	South America and Central America	Size: 19–31 cm (7–12 in) long, plus 19–39 cm (7–15 in) tail Habitat: Forest and shrubland Diet: Insects and other invertebrates, as well as fruit, seeds, and small mammals	LC Unknown

Genus Monodelphis – Burnett, 1830 – seventeen species
Common name	Scientific name and subspecies	Range	Size and ecology	IUCN status and estimated population
Amazonian red-sided opossum	M. glirina (Wagner, 1842)	Central South America	Size: 7–20 cm (3–8 in) long, plus 4–11 cm (2–4 in) tail Habitat: Forest Diet: Small vertebrates, insects, carrion, seeds, and fruit	LC Unknown
Emilia's short-tailed opossum	M. emiliae (Thomas, 1912)	Central South America	Size: 7–20 cm (3–8 in) long, plus 4–11 cm (2–4 in) tail Habitat: Forest Diet: Small vertebrates, insects, carrion, seeds, and fruit	LC Unknown
Gray short-tailed opossum	M. domestica (Wagner, 1842)	Central and eastern South America	Size: 10–15 cm (4–6 in) long, plus tail Habitat: Forest, shrubland, and grassland Diet: Insects, fruits, and small animals	LC Unknown
Handley's short-tailed opossum	M. handleyi Solari, 2007	Central South America	Size: 7–20 cm (3–8 in) long, plus 4–11 cm (2–4 in) tail Habitat: Forest Diet: Small vertebrates, insects, carrion, seeds, and fruit	DD Unknown
Hooded red-sided opossum	M. palliolata (Osgood, 1914)	Northern South America	Size: 7–20 cm (3–8 in) long, plus 4–11 cm (2–4 in) tail Habitat: Forest Diet: Small vertebrates, insects, carrion, seeds, and fruit	LC Unknown
Ihering's three-striped opossum	M. iheringi (Thomas, 1888)	Eastern South America	Size: 7–20 cm (3–8 in) long, plus 4–11 cm (2–4 in) tail Habitat: Forest and unknown Diet: Small vertebrates, insects, carrion, seeds, and fruit	DD Unknown
Long-nosed short-tailed opossum	M. scalops (Thomas, 1888)	Eastern South America	Size: 7–20 cm (3–8 in) long, plus 4–11 cm (2–4 in) tail Habitat: Forest Diet: Small vertebrates, insects, carrion, seeds, and fruit	LC Unknown
Northern red-sided opossum	M. brevicaudata (Erxleben, 1777)	Northern South America	Size: 7–20 cm (3–8 in) long, plus 4–11 cm (2–4 in) tail Habitat: Forest Diet: Small vertebrates, insects, carrion, seeds, and fruit	LC Unknown
Northern three-striped opossum	M. americana (Müller, 1776)	Eastern South America	Size: 7–20 cm (3–8 in) long, plus 4–11 cm (2–4 in) tail Habitat: Forest and shrubland Diet: Small vertebrates, insects, carrion, seeds, and fruit	LC Unknown
One-striped opossum	M. unistriata (Wagner, 1842)	Southeastern South America	Size: 7–20 cm (3–8 in) long, plus 4–11 cm (2–4 in) tail Habitat: Forest Diet: Small vertebrates, insects, carrion, seeds, and fruit	CR 2–10
Osgood's short-tailed opossum	M. osgoodi Doutt, 1938	Western South America	Size: 7–20 cm (3–8 in) long, plus 4–11 cm (2–4 in) tail Habitat: Forest Diet: Small vertebrates, insects, carrion, seeds, and fruit	LC Unknown
Peruvian short-tailed opossum	M. peruviana (Osgood, 1913)	Peru	Size: 7–20 cm (3–8 in) long, plus 4–11 cm (2–4 in) tail Habitat: Forest Diet: Small vertebrates, insects, carrion, seeds, and fruit	LC Unknown
Pygmy short-tailed opossum	M. kunsi Pine, 1975	Central South America	Size: 7–20 cm (3–8 in) long, plus 4–11 cm (2–4 in) tail Habitat: Forest and savanna Diet: Small vertebrates, insects, carrion, seeds, and fruit	LC Unknown
Reig's opossum	M. reigi Lew, Pérez-Hernández, 2004	Northern South America	Size: 7–20 cm (3–8 in) long, plus 4–11 cm (2–4 in) tail Habitat: Forest Diet: Small vertebrates, insects, carrion, seeds, and fruit	VU Unknown
Ronald's opossum	M. ronaldi Solari, 2004	Western South America	Size: 7–20 cm (3–8 in) long, plus 4–11 cm (2–4 in) tail Habitat: Forest Diet: Small vertebrates, insects, carrion, seeds, and fruit	LC Unknown
Sepia short-tailed opossum	M. adusta (Thomas, 1897)	Northwestern South America	Size: 9–13 cm (4–5 in) long, plus 4–7 cm (2–3 in) tail Habitat: Forest Diet: Invertebrates, fruits and small vertebrates	LC Unknown
Yellow-sided opossum	M. dimidiata (Wagner, 1847)	Southern South America	Size: 7–20 cm (3–8 in) long, plus 4–11 cm (2–4 in) tail Habitat: Forest, grassland, and inland wetlands Diet: Small vertebrates, insects, carrion, seeds, and fruit	LC Unknown

Genus Philander – Brisson, 1762 – five species
Common name	Scientific name and subspecies	Range	Size and ecology	IUCN status and estimated population
Anderson's four-eyed opossum	P. andersoni (Osgood, 1913)	Northwestern South America	Size: 25–35 cm (10–14 in) long, plus 25–35 cm (10–14 in) tail Habitat: Forest Diet: Insects, other small invertebrates, eggs, and fruit	LC Unknown
Deltaic four-eyed opossum	P. deltae Lew, Pérez-Hernández, Ventura, 2006	Northern South America	Size: 20–38 cm (8–15 in) long, plus 19–36 cm (7–14 in) tail Habitat: Forest and inland wetlands Diet: Small mammals, other small vertebrates, eggs, insects, other invertebrates, fruit, and carrion	LC Unknown
Gray four-eyed opossum	P. opossum (Linnaeus, 1758) Two subspecies: P. o. fuscogriseus; P. o. opossum	Northern and central South America and Central America	Size: 20–34 cm (8–13 in) long, plus 19–36 cm (7–14 in) tail Habitat: Forest and shrubland Diet: Omnivorous, including invertebrates, small animals, leaves, bark, seeds, nuts, nectar, and fruit	LC Unknown
McIlhenny's four-eyed opossum	P. mcilhennyi Gardner, Patton, 1972	Central South America	Size: 28–31 cm (11–12 in) long, plus 26–38 cm (10–15 in) tail Habitat: Forest Diet: Believed to be omnivorous	LC Unknown
Southeastern four-eyed opossum	P. frenatus Olfers, 1818	Map of range	Size: 21–29 cm (8–11 in) long, plus 17–32 cm (7–13 in) tail Habitat: Forest Diet: Omnivorous, including flowers, fruit, invertebrates, and small vertebrates	LC Unknown

Genus Thylamys – Gray, 1843 – nine species
Common name	Scientific name and subspecies	Range	Size and ecology	IUCN status and estimated population
Argentine fat-tailed mouse opossum	T. sponsorius (Thomas, 1921)	Central South America	Size: 6–15 cm (2–6 in) long, plus 6–17 cm (2–7 in) tail Habitat: Shrubland Diet: Insects, as well as fruit and small vertebrates	LC Unknown
Buff-bellied fat-tailed mouse opossum	T. venustus (Thomas, 1902)	Central South America	Size: 6–15 cm (2–6 in) long, plus 6–17 cm (2–7 in) tail Habitat: Forest, savanna, and shrubland Diet: Insects, as well as fruit and small vertebrates	DD Unknown
Common fat-tailed mouse opossum	T. pusillus (Desmarest, 1804)	Central South America	Size: 7–12 cm (3–5 in) long, plus 8–14 cm (3–6 in) tail Habitat: Forest and savanna Diet: Insects, as well as fruit and small vertebrates	LC Unknown
Dwarf fat-tailed mouse opossum	T. velutinus (Wagner, 1842)	Eastern South America	Size: 6–15 cm (2–6 in) long, plus 6–17 cm (2–7 in) tail Habitat: Forest, savanna, shrubland, and grassland Diet: Insects, as well as fruit and small vertebrates	NT Unknown
Elegant fat-tailed mouse opossum	T. elegans (Waterhouse, 1839)	Southwestern South America	Size: 6–15 cm (2–6 in) long, plus 6–17 cm (2–7 in) tail Habitat: Forest and shrubland Diet: Insects, as well as fruit and small vertebrates	LC Unknown
Karimi's fat-tailed mouse opossum	T. karimii (Petter, 1968)	Central South America	Size: 6–15 cm (2–6 in) long, plus 6–17 cm (2–7 in) tail Habitat: Forest and savanna Diet: Insects, as well as fruit and small vertebrates	VU Unknown
Paraguayan fat-tailed mouse opossum	T. macrurus (Olfers, 1818)	Central South America	Size: 6–15 cm (2–6 in) long, plus 6–17 cm (2–7 in) tail Habitat: Forest, savanna, and shrubland Diet: Insects, as well as fruit and small vertebrates	NT Unknown
Tate's fat-tailed mouse opossum	T. tatei (Handley, 1957)	Western South America	Size: 6–15 cm (2–6 in) long, plus 6–17 cm (2–7 in) tail Habitat: Shrubland and desert Diet: Insects, as well as fruit and small vertebrates	DD Unknown
White-bellied fat-tailed mouse opossum	T. pallidior (Thomas, 1902)	Southwestern South America	Size: 7–11 cm (3–4 in) long, plus 9–12 cm (4–5 in) tail Habitat: Shrubland and desert Diet: Arthropods, as well as leaves, fruit, and seeds	LC Unknown

Genus Tlacuatzin – Voss, Jansa, 2003 – one species
Common name	Scientific name and subspecies	Range	Size and ecology	IUCN status and estimated population
Grayish mouse opossum	T. canescens (Allen, 1893)	Southern Mexico	Size: 8–15 cm (3–6 in) long, plus 9–17 cm (4–7 in) tail Habitat: Forest and shrubland Diet: Insects and fruit	LC Unknown

=== Subfamily Glironiinae ===
Genus Glironia – Thomas, 1912 – one species
Common name	Scientific name and subspecies	Range	Size and ecology	IUCN status and estimated population
Bushy-tailed opossum	G. venusta Thomas, 1912	West-central South America	Size: 13–20 cm (5–8 in) long, plus 19–23 cm (7–9 in) tail Habitat: Forest Diet: Insects, seeds, fruit, and eggs	LC Unknown

=== Subfamily Hyladelphinae ===
Genus Hyladelphys – Voss, Lunde, Simmons, 2001 – one species
Common name	Scientific name and subspecies	Range	Size and ecology	IUCN status and estimated population
Kalinowski's mouse opossum	H. kalinowskii (Hershkovitz, 1992)	North-central South America	Size: 6–10 cm (2–4 in) long, plus 9–12 cm (4–5 in) tail Habitat: Forest Diet: Unknown	LC Unknown

== Sources ==
- Burnie, David (2017). Animal: The Definitive Visual Guide. DK. ISBN 978-1-4654-7086-7.
- Nowak, Ronald M. (2018). Walker's Mammals of the World. Vol. Monotremes, Marsupials, Afrotherians, Xenarthrans, and Sundatherians. Johns Hopkins University Press. ISBN 978-1-4214-2468-2.
- Gardner, Alfred L. (2005). Wilson, Don E.; Reeder, DeeAnn M. (eds.). Mammal Species of the World. Vol. 1 (3rd ed.). Johns Hopkins University Press. ISBN 978-0-8018-8221-0.
