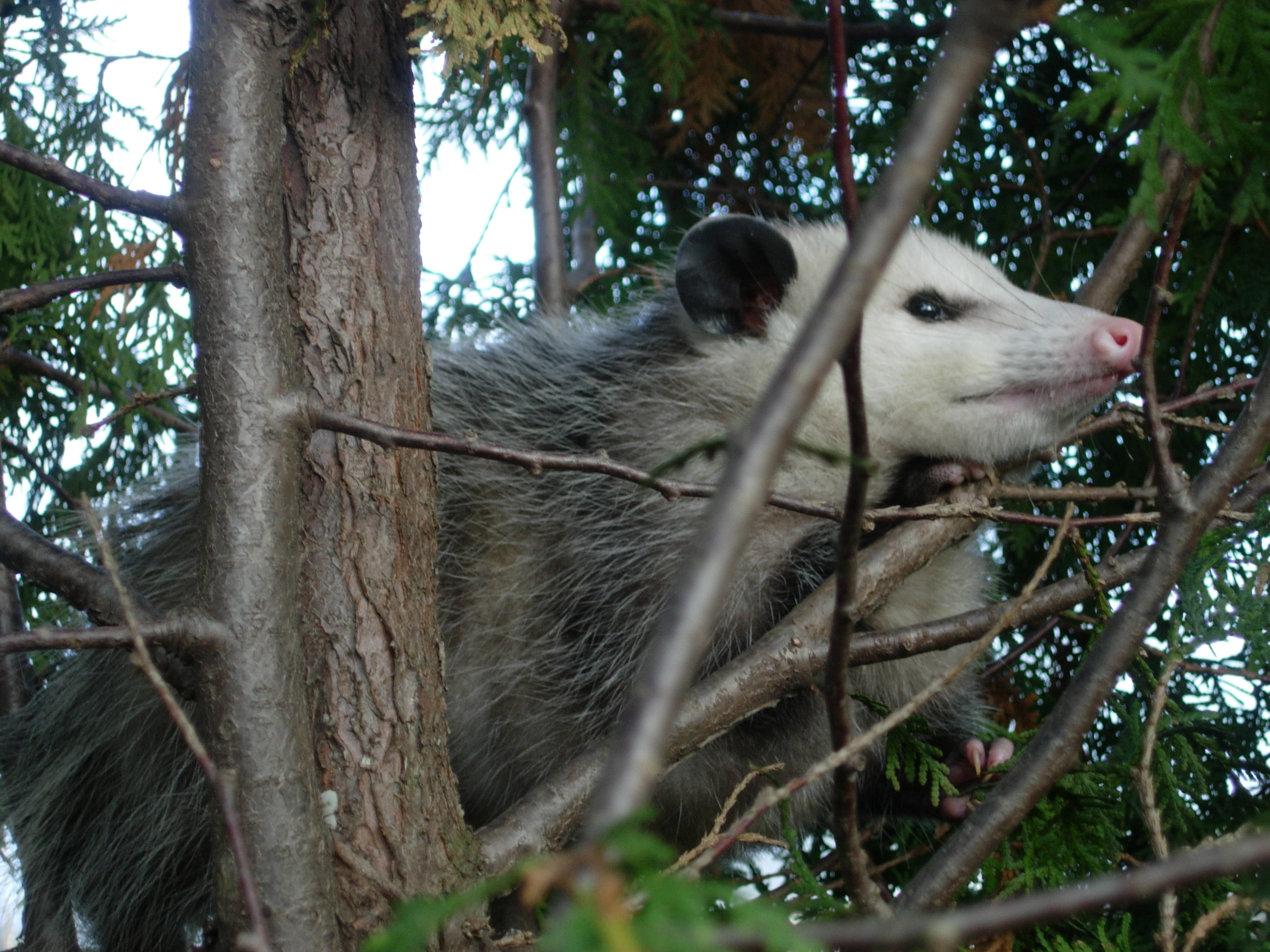
- Virginia opossum (Didelphis virginiana) in Ohio.

Scientific classification
- Kingdom: Animalia
- Phylum: Chordata
- Class: Mammalia
- Infraclass: Marsupialia
- Order: Didelphimorphia
- Family: Didelphidae
- Subfamily: Didelphinae; Gray, 1821

Genera
- Chacodelphys; Chironectes; Cryptonanus; Didelphis; Gracilinanus; Lestodelphys; Lutreolina; Marmosa; Marmosops; Metachirus; Monodelphis; Philander; Thylamys; Tlacuatzin

= Didelphinae =

Subfamily of marsupials

The Didelphinae are a subfamily of opossums consisting of 15 genera and 123 species. Specimens have been collected throughout the Americas, but are predominant in South and Central America.

Some sources call this subfamily the "American opossums", while others use that term for the whole family of opossums, Didelphidae. The term may be redundant, though, since all opossums are native to the Americas, while their distant Australian taxonomic relatives, in the suborder Phalangeriformes are referred to as possums in Australia.

== Classification ==
- Subfamily Didelphinae
  - Genus Chacodelphys
    - C. formosa - Chacoan pygmy opossum
  - Genus Chironectes
    - C. minimus - water opossum
  - Genus Cryptonanus
    - C. agricolai - Agricola's gracile opossum
    - C. chacoensis - Chacoan gracile opossum
    - C. guahybae - Guahiba gracile opossum
    - †C. ignitus - red-bellied gracile opossum
    - C. unduaviensis - Unduavi gracile opossum
  - Genus Didelphis
    - D. albiventris - white-eared opossum
    - D. aurita - big-eared opossum
    - D. imperfecta - Guianan white-eared opossum
    - D. marsupialis - common opossum
    - D. pernigra - Andean white-eared opossum
    - D. virginiana - Virginia opossum
  - Genus Gracilinanus
    - G. aceramarcae - Aceramarca gracile opossum
    - G. agilis - agile gracile opossum
    - G. dryas - wood sprite gracile opossum
    - G. emilae - Emilia's gracile opossum
    - G. marica - northern gracile opossum
    - G. microtarsus - Brazilian gracile opossum
    - G. peruanus - Peruvian opossum
  - Genus Lestodelphys
    - L. halli - Patagonian opossum
  - Genus Lutreolina
    - L. crassicaudata - big lutrine opossum
    - L. massoia - Massoia's lutrine opossum
  - Genus Marmosa
    - Subgenus Marmosa
      - M. andersoni - heavy-browed mouse opossum
      - M. isthmica - isthmian mouse opossum
      - M. lepida - rufous mouse opossum
      - M. mexicana - Mexican mouse opossum
      - M. murina - Linnaeus's mouse opossum
      - M. quichua - Quechuan mouse opossum
      - M. robinsoni - Robinson's mouse opossum
      - M. rubra - red mouse opossum
      - M. simonsi - Simon's mouse opossum
      - M. tyleriana - Tyler's mouse opossum
      - M. waterhousei - Waterhouse's mouse opossum
      - M. xerophila - Guajira mouse opossum
      - M. zeledoni - Zeledon's mouse opossum
    - Subgenus Micoureus
      - M. alstoni - Alston's woolly mouse opossum
      - M. constantiae - white-bellied woolly mouse opossum
      - M. demerarae - northeastern woolly mouse opossum
      - M. germana - northwestern woolly mouse opossum
      - M. jansae - Jansa's woolly mouse opossum
      - M. limae - Brazilian woolly mouse opossum
      - M. meridae - Merida woolly mouse opossum
      - M. paraguayanus - Tate's woolly mouse opossum
      - M. parda - Peruvian woolly mouse opossum
      - M. perplexa - Anthony's woolly mouse opossum
      - M. phaeus - little woolly mouse opossum
      - M. rapposa - Bolivian woolly mouse opossum
      - M. rutteri - bare-tailed woolly mouse opossum
  - Genus Marmosops
    - M. bishopi - Bishop's slender opossum
    - M. carri - Carr's slender opossum
    - M. caucae - Tschudi's slender opossum
    - M. chucha - Cordillera slender opossum
    - M. cracens - narrow-headed slender opossum
    - M. creightoni - Creighton's slender opossum
    - M. fuscatus - dusky slender opossum
    - M. handleyi - Handley's slender opossum
    - M. impavidus - Tschudi's slender opossum
    - M. incanus - gray slender opossum
    - M. invictus - Panama slender opossum
    - M. juninensis - Junin slender opossum
    - M. magdalenae - Río Magdalena slender opossum
    - M. marina - Silva's slender opossum
    - M. neblina - Neblina slender opossum
    - M. noctivagus - white-bellied slender opossum
    - M. ocellatus - Dorothy's slender opossum
    - M. ojastii - Ojasti's slender opossum
    - M. pakaraimae - pantepui slender opossum
    - M. parvidens - delicate slender opossum
    - M. paulensis - Brazilian slender opossum
    - M. pinheiroi - Pinheiro's slender opossum
    - M. soinii - Soini's slender opossum
    - M. woodalli - Woodall's slender opossum
  - Genus Metachirus
    - M. myosuros - common brown four-eyed opossum
    - M. nudicaudatus - Guianan brown four-eyed opossum
  - Genus Monodelphis
    - M. adusta - sepia short-tailed opossum
    - M. americana - northern three-striped opossum
    - M. arlindoi - Arlindo's short-tailed opossum
    - M. brevicaudata - northern red-sided opossum
    - M. dimidiata - yellow-sided opossum
    - M. domestica - gray short-tailed opossum
    - M. emiliae - Emilia's short-tailed opossum
    - M. gardneri - Gardner's short-tailed opossum
    - M. glirina - Amazonian red-sided opossum
    - M. handleyi - Handley's short-tailed opossum
    - M. iheringi - Ihering's three-striped opossum
    - M. kunsi - pygmy short-tailed opossum
    - M. maraxina - Marajó short-tailed opossum
    - M. osgoodi - Osgood's short-tailed opossum
    - M. palliolata - hooded red-sided opossum
    - M. peruviana - Peruvian short-tailed opossum
    - M. pinocchio - long-nosed short-tailed opossum
    - M. reigi - Reig's opossum
    - M. ronaldi - Ronald's opossum
    - M. rubida - chestnut-striped opossum
    - M. saci - Saci short-tailed opossum
    - M. sanctaerosae - Santa Rosa short-tailed opossum
    - M. scalops - long-nosed short-tailed opossum
    - M. sorex - southern red-sided opossum
    - M. theresa - southern three-striped opossum
    - M. touan - Touan short-tailed opossum
    - M. umbristriata - red three-striped opossum
    - M. unistriata - one-striped opossum
    - M. vossi - Voss's short-tailed opossum
  - Genus Philander
    - P. andersoni - Anderson's four-eyed opossum
    - P. canus - common four-eyed opossum
    - P. deltae - Deltaic four-eyed opossum
    - P. frenatus - southeastern four-eyed opossum
    - P. mcilhennyi - McIlhenny's four-eyed opossum
    - P. melanurus - dark four-eyed opossum
    - P. mondolfii - Mondolfi's four-eyed opossum
    - P. nigratus - black four-eyed opossum
    - P. olrogi - Olrog's four-eyed opossum
    - P. opossum - gray four-eyed opossum
    - P. pebas - Pebas four-eyed opossum
    - P. vossi - northern four-eyed opossum
  - Genus Thylamys
    - T. cinderella - Cinderella fat-tailed mouse opossum
    - T. citellus - Mesopotamian fat-tailed mouse opossum
    - T. elegans - elegant fat-tailed mouse opossum
    - T. karimii - Karimi's fat-tailed mouse opossum
    - T. macrurus - Paraguayan fat-tailed mouse opossum
    - T. pallidior - white-bellied fat-tailed mouse opossum
    - T. pulchellus - Dry Chaco fat-tailed mouse opossum
    - T. pusillus - Chacoan fat-tailed mouse opossum
    - T. sponsorius - Argentine fat-tailed mouse opossum
    - T. tatei - Tate's fat-tailed mouse opossum
    - T. velutinus - dwarf fat-tailed mouse opossum
    - T. venustus - buff-bellied fat-tailed mouse opossum
  - Genus Tlacuatzin
    - T. balsasensis - Balsas gray mouse opossum
    - T. canescens - Tehuantepec gray mouse opossum
    - T. gaumeri - Yucatan gray mouse opossum
    - T. insularis - Tres Marías gray mouse opossum
    - T. sinaloae - northern gray mouse opossum
- Extinct genera:
  - Andinodelphys - Marshall & de Muizon, 1988 (†)
  - Coona - Simpson, 1938 (†)
  - Incadelphys - Marshall & de Muizon, 1988 (†)
  - Itaboraidelphys - Marshall & de Muizon, 1984 (†)
  - Marmosopsis - Paula Couto, 1962 (†)
  - Mizquedelphys - Marshall & de Muizon, 1988 (†)
  - Thylophorops - Reig, 1952 (†)
  - Thylatheridium - Reig, 1952 (†)
  - Zygolestes - Ameghino, 1898 (†)
