= Marmosops pakaraimae =

Conservation status
- Vulnerable (IUCN 3.1)

Scientific classification
- Kingdom: Animalia
- Phylum: Chordata
- Class: Mammalia
- Infraclass: Marsupialia
- Order: Didelphimorphia
- Family: Didelphidae
- Genus: Marmosops
- Species: M. pakaraimae

Binomial name
- Marmosops pakaraimae Voss, Lim, Díaz-Nieto & Jansa, 2013

Species of mammal

Marmosops pakaraimae, the Pantepui slender opossum, is a species of opossum within the genus Marmosops.

== Distribution ==
Marmosops pakaraimae is known from five localities, with three in the Pakaraima Highlands of western Guyana and two in adjacent highlands of eastern Venezuela. Recorded elevations at these localities range from 800 to approximately 1500 m above sea level.

Marmosops pakaraimae is one of only seven mammalian species known to be endemic to the Pantepui region. While the endemic flora and avian fauna of this area have been relatively well-studied, mammalian endemism remains limited. Prior to the description of Marmosops pakaraimae, the only didelphid marsupials known to be restricted to the region were Marmosa tyleriana and Monodelphis reigi.

== Description ==
Marmosops pakaraimae is a small species within the genus Marmosops, exhibiting all diagnostic qualitative traits typical of the genus. The body pelage is dark brown (near dark umber) dorsally, with indistinctly paler lateral coloration and a superficially whitish ventral side. The hairs of the throat, chest, and abdomen are uniformly gray-based, with self-white fur limited to the apex of the chin, oral margins, and scrotum.

Marmosops pakaraimae's long tail is substantially longer than the combined length of the head and body (mean LT/HBL × 100 = 150%). It possesses long nasal bones that are wider posteriorly than anteriorly, a very broad interorbital region, and rounded supraorbital margins. The species also features unique dental characteristics, including short upper canines with both anterior and posterior accessory cusps, as well as specific traits in the lower molars.

=== Morphological comparisons ===
Marmosops pakaraimae averages larger than Marmosops parvidens in all measured external dimensions except ear length, with notable differences in dorsal and ventral pelage coloration. The species is also larger than Marmosops pinheiroi, with comparable differences in coloration and morphology, particularly in cranial measurements and dental characteristics.
