= Pinero =

Pinero or Piñero may refer to:

== Places ==
- Piñero Island, Antarctica
- Piñero Peak, on the Piñero Island, Antarctica
- Piñero (Santa Fe), Argentina
- Piñero station, San Juan, Puerto Rico
- Gobernador Piñero, San Juan, Puerto Rico
- El Piñero, a municipality in Zamora, Spain
- Pinero, Virginia, United States

== Other ==
- Pinero (surname)
- Piñero, a 2001 American drama film about Miguel Piñero

== See also ==
- Piñeiro (disambiguation)
