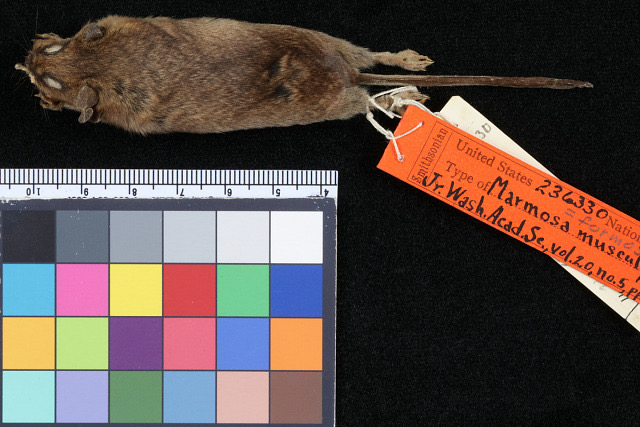

Conservation status
- Near Threatened (IUCN 3.1)

Scientific classification
- Kingdom: Animalia
- Phylum: Chordata
- Class: Mammalia
- Infraclass: Marsupialia
- Order: Didelphimorphia
- Family: Didelphidae
- Subfamily: Didelphinae
- Tribe: Thylamyini
- Genus: Chacodelphys; Voss et al., 2004
- Species: C. formosa

Binomial name
- Chacodelphys formosa (Shamel, 1930)
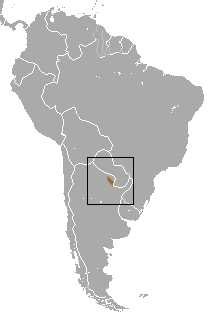
- Chacoan pygmy opossum range

= Chacoan pygmy opossum =

Species of marsupial

The Chacoan pygmy opossum (Chacodelphys formosa) is a recently described genus and species of didelphimorph marsupial. The only species in Chacodelphys, C. formosa, was known until 2004 from only one specimen collected in 1920 in the Chaco of Formosa Province, Argentina.

== Description ==
The Chacoan pygmy opossum is the smallest known species of didelphid. It has a head-body length of 68 mm, a tail of 55 mm and a hind foot of 11. It differs from the other "marmosine" genera (Marmosa, Monodelphis, Thylamys, Tlacuatzin, Gracilinanus, Marmosops, Lestodelphys) in having a long third manual digit, no distinctly tricolored pelage, a long fourth pedal digit, and a tail shorter than head-body. No other marmosine genera has this combination of characters. It is endemic to a small region of northern Argentina.

== Taxonomic history ==
C. formosa was originally described as Marmosa muscula Shamel (1930a); however, this name is preoccupied, so Shamel (1930b) renamed it M. formosa. Afterwards, George Tate (1933) considered it a valid member of his "Elegans group" (=Thylamys) of Marmosa, whereafter it has been variously synonymized or treated as a distinct species of Marmosa or Thylamys until 1989, when Gardner & Creighton (1989) listed it as a synonym of Gracilinanus agilis, and then later separated from this species as G. formosus. Finally, Voss et al. (2004) erected the new genus Chacodelphys for the species.
