= Pinheiro =

Pinheiro is a Portuguese surname of Jewish origin (Sephardic); a topographic name for someone who lived by a conspicuous pine tree or by a pine forest, from pinheiro ‘pine’, or habitational name for any of the numerous places named Pinheiro.

== People ==
=== Footballers ===
- Alessandro Pinheiro Martins (1983-2005), Brazilian footballer
- Carlos Alberto Souto Pinheiro Júnior (born 1984), Brazilian footballer
- Erin Pinheiro (born 1997), Capeverdian footballer
- Grazielle Pinheiro Nascimento (born 1981), Brazilian footballer
- João Carlos Batista Pinheiro (1932-2011), Brazilian footballer
- Julio César Pinheiro (born 1976), Mexican footballer
- Juninho Pinheiro (born 1985), Brazilian footballer
- Max Brendon Costa Pinheiro (born 1983), Brazilian footballer
- Moisés Moura Pinheiro (born 1979), Brazilian footballer
- Paquito (footballer born 1981), Brazilian footballer
- Pedro Miguel da Câmara Pinheiro (born 1977), Portuguese footballer
- Rafael de Andrade Bittencourt Pinheiro (born 1982), Brazilian footballer
- Rogerio Pinheiro Dos Santos (born 1972), Brazilian footballer
- Túlio Lustosa Seixas Pinheiro (born 1976), Brazilian footballer

=== Politicians ===
- Israel Pinheiro da Silva (1896-1973), Brazilian politician
- João de Deus Pinheiro (born 1945), Portuguese politician
- João Pinheiro Chagas (1863-1925), former Prime Minister of Portugal
- João Pinheiro da Silva (1860-1908), Brazilian politician
- José Baptista Pinheiro de Azevedo (1917-1983), Portuguese politician

=== Other ===
- Beatriz Pinheiro (1872-1922) Portuguese writer
- Columbano Bordalo Pinheiro (1857-1929), Portuguese painter
- Heloísa Pinheiro (born 1945), Brazilian model
- Hugo Pinheiro, Portuguese bodyboarder
- Joaquim Pinheiro (born 1960), Portuguese runner
- Lucas Dos Santos Pinheiro (born 1994), Brazilian Jiu Jitsu athlete
- Lucas Pinheiro Braathen (born 2000), Norwegian-Brazilian alpine skier
- Moses Pinheiro (17th century), Italian rabbi and Kabbalist
- Nuno Pinheiro (born 1984), Portuguese volleyball player
- Paulo Sérgio Pinheiro (born 1944), Brazilian diplomat, UN envoy
- Rafael Bordalo Pinheiro (1846-1905), Portuguese artist and comics creator
- Wilson Pinheiro (died 1980), Brazilian activist
- Paulo César Pinheiro (born 1949), Brazilian poet and composer

== Places ==
=== Brazil ===
- Pinheiros River, a river in the State of São Paulo
- Pinheiros (district of São Paulo), a barrio in the State of São Paulo
- Pinheiros, Espírito Santo, a municipality in the State of Espírito Santo
- Pinheiro, Maranhão, place in the mesoregion Maranhão

=== Portugal ===
- Pinheiro (Aguiar da Beira), a civil parish in Aguiar da Beira Municipality, Guarda District
- Pinheiro (Castro Daire), a civil parish in the municipality of Castro Daire
- Pinheiro (Guimarães), a civil parish in the municipality of Guimarães
- Pinheiro (Penafiel), a civil parish in the municipality of Penafiel

Other variants:

- Pinheiro Grande, a civil parish in the municipality of Chamusca
- Boavista dos Pinheiros, a civil parish in the municipality of Odemira

== Other ==
- Pinheiro, one of the festivities of the Nicolinas
- Pinheiro's slender opossum, a species of opossum
- Estádio Engenheiro Vidal Pinheiro, a stadium in Porto, Portugal
- Rafael Bordalo Pinheiro Museum, a museum in Lisbon, Portugal
- Rodovia Floriano Rodrigues Pinheiro, a highway in São Paulo state, Brazil
- Roman Catholic Diocese of Pinheiro, diocese in the state of Maranhão, Brazil

== See also ==
- Piñeiro (disambiguation)
- Piñeyro (disambiguation)
