= Piñeyro =

Piñeyro may refer to:

- Irma Piñeyro Arias (b. 1954), Mexican politician from the Revolutionary Institutional Party
- Enrique Piñeyro (actor), Italian-born Argentine pilot turned film actor, director, producer, and screenwriter
- Enrique Piñeyro Queralt, Spanish aristocrat and president of FC Barcelona between 1940 and 1943
- Luis Piñeyro del Campo (1853-1909), Uruguayan lawyer, politician and philanthropist
- Marcelo Piñeyro, Argentine film director, producer and screenwriter

== See also ==
- Pinheiro (disambiguation)
- Piñeiro (disambiguation)
