= Pinero (surname) =

Pinero or Piñero or Pinhero is a surname of the following people

- Aaron Franco Pinhero, 17th century Jewish mathematician
- Arthur Wing Pinero (1855–1934), English actor, dramatist and stage director
- Begoña García Piñero (born 1976), Spanish basketball player
- Dolores Piñero (1892–1975), Puerto Rican doctor
- Esteban Piñero Camacho (born 1981), Spanish singer
- Facundo Piñero (born 1988), Argentinian basketball player
- Félix Piñero (born 1945), Venezuelan fencer
- Harry Pinero (born 1991), British YouTuber
- Inmaculada Rodríguez-Piñero (born 1958), Spanish politician
- Jesús T. Piñero (1897–1952), governor of Puerto Rico
- Juan Jesús Piñero Bolarín (born 1988), Spanish football forward
- Manuel Piñero (born 1952), Spanish golfer
- Marlon Piñero (born 1972), Filipino football player
- Miguel Piñero (1946–1988), Puerto Rican playwright and actor
  - Piñero, a 2001 American drama film about Miguel Piñero
- Norberto Piñero (1858–1938), Argentine lawyer, writer and politician
- Sergio Piñero (born 1974), trap shooter from the Dominican Republic
- Taqwa Pinero (born 1983), American basketball player
