= Piñeiro =

Piñeiro may refer to:

== People ==
- Eddy Piñeiro (born 1995), American football player
- Graciela Piñeiro Uruguayan biologist and paleontologist
- Ignacio Piñeiro (1888–1969), Cuban musician
- Joel Piñeiro (born 1978), Puerto Rican baseball player
- Manuel Piñeiro Losada (1933–1998), "Barba Roja", Cuban revolutionary, counter-intelligence, etc.
- Markos Piñeiro Pizelli (born 1984), Brazilian footballer
- Omar Pineiro (born 1997), American rapper known professionally as Smokepurpp

== Places ==
- Piñeiro, Buenos Aires, Argentina

== See also ==
- Pinero (disambiguation)
- Pinheiro (disambiguation)
- Piñeyro (disambiguation)
