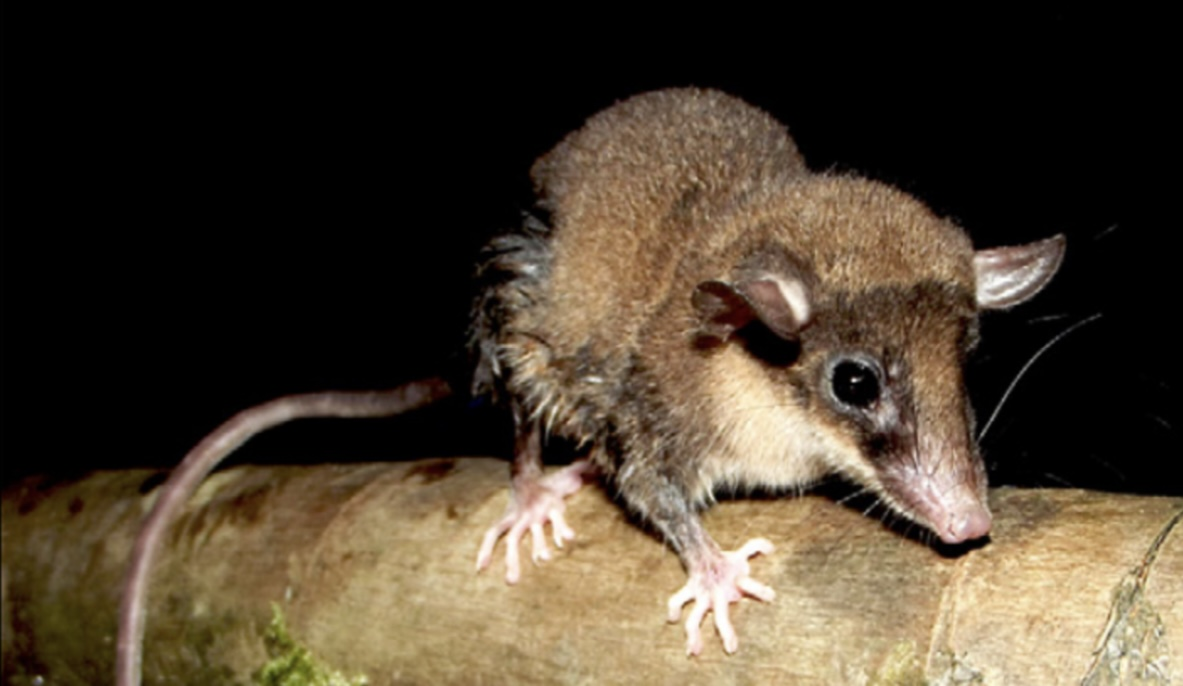
- Marmosops caucae on a log

Conservation status
- Least Concern (IUCN 3.1)

Scientific classification
- Kingdom: Animalia
- Phylum: Chordata
- Class: Mammalia
- Infraclass: Marsupialia
- Order: Didelphimorphia
- Family: Didelphidae
- Genus: Marmosops
- Species: M. caucae

Binomial name
- Marmosops caucae (Thomas, 1900)

= Marmosops caucae =

Species of marsupial

Marmosops caucae, the Cauca slender opossum, is a species of opossum from the Marmosops genus endemic to the eastern and western Andes. It is a diminutive species and its coat is 7 to 8 mm (0.28 to 0.31 in) thick. The ventral fur is a dark brown with shades of gray. The species was scientifically described in 1900 by Oldfield Thomas.

== Description ==
The lower part of their faces is lighter than the center. The majority of the total length of hairs on the exterior of the abdomen seem to be an orange color. The fingers and toes are slightly coated in translucent white hair, and the wrists and elbows are brown. The external parts of the limbs are dark in color, while the interior parts are the same color as the sides of the abdomen. The tail is bicolored and prehensile.
