= Aaron Franco Pinhero =

17th-century Dutch mathematician

Aaron Franco Pinhero was a Jewish Dutch mathematician who lived in the 17th century. He lived at Amsterdam, though was likely of Spanish or Portuguese descent, as he appears to have written in Spanish.

He was the author of the astronomical work Lunario Perpetuo Calculado, which was published in quarto in Amsterdam in 1657.
