= Neblina slender opossum =

Conservation status
- Least Concern (IUCN 3.1)

Scientific classification
- Kingdom: Animalia
- Phylum: Chordata
- Class: Mammalia
- Infraclass: Marsupialia
- Order: Didelphimorphia
- Family: Didelphidae
- Genus: Marmosops
- Species: M. neblina

Binomial name
- Marmosops neblina Gardner, 1990
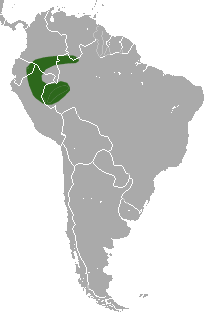
- Neblina slender opossum range

Species of mammal

The neblina slender opossum (Marmosops neblina) is an opossum species from South America. It is found in Brazil, Ecuador, Venezuela, and perhaps Peru.
