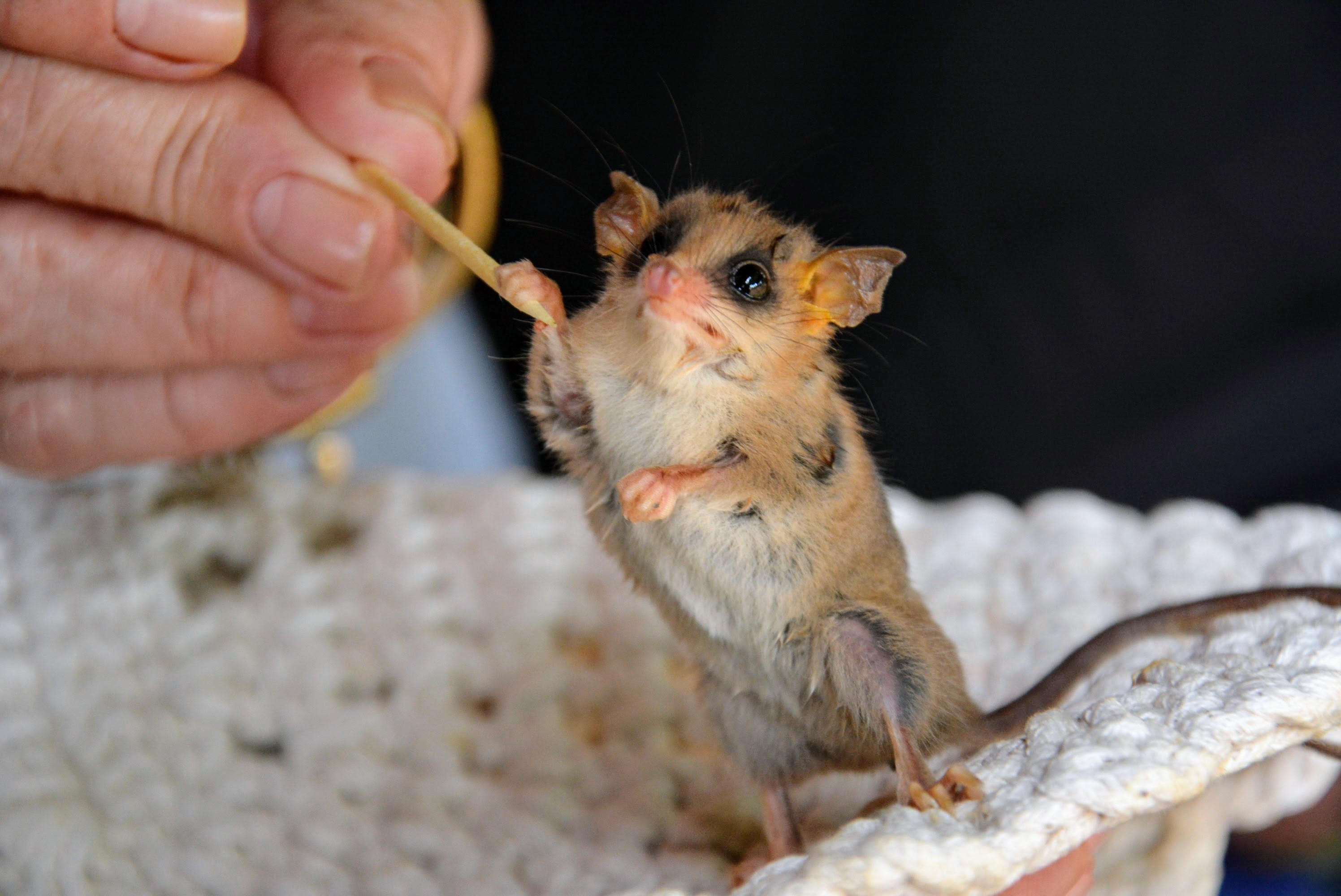
- Brazilian slender opossum holding onto a toothpick

Conservation status
- Least Concern (IUCN 3.1)

Scientific classification
- Kingdom: Animalia
- Phylum: Chordata
- Class: Mammalia
- Infraclass: Marsupialia
- Order: Didelphimorphia
- Family: Didelphidae
- Genus: Marmosops
- Species: M. paulensis

Binomial name
- Marmosops paulensis Tate, 1931
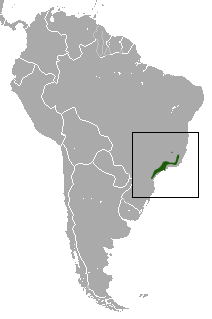
- Brazilian slender opossum range

= Brazilian slender opossum =

Species of marsupial

The Brazilian slender opossum (Marmosops paulensis) is an opossum species from South America. It is found in moist montane forest in the Atlantic Forest region of southeastern Brazil, including the states of Minas Gerais, Rio de Janeiro, São Paulo and Paraná. Its breeding may be fully semelparous, which is unusual for a mammal.

It is considered monotypic and analysis of mtDNA sequences has distinguished this species from other Marmosops. Similar to the gray slender opossum (M. Incanus), adults of this species have short fur while young have long, soft fur. Early research identified M. paulensis as a subspecies of M. incana. The name M paulensis came from a mistaken attribution of the species origin as São Paulo. Subsequent research has, however, distinguished M. paulensis based on various features like smaller upper canines, absence of palatine fenestrae and longer incisive foramina.
