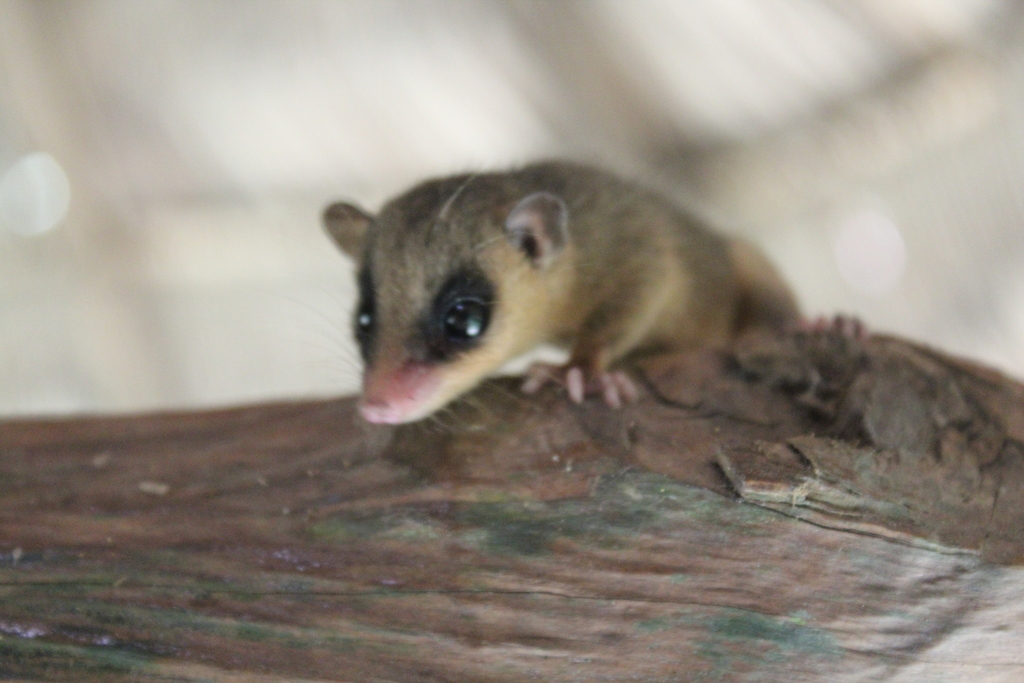

Conservation status
- Least Concern (IUCN 3.1)

Scientific classification
- Kingdom: Animalia
- Phylum: Chordata
- Class: Mammalia
- Infraclass: Marsupialia
- Order: Didelphimorphia
- Family: Didelphidae
- Genus: Marmosops
- Species: M. noctivagus

Binomial name
- Marmosops noctivagus (Tschudi, 1845)
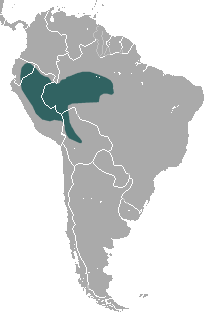
- White-bellied slender opossum range

= White-bellied slender opossum =

Species of marsupial

The white-bellied slender opossum (Marmosops noctivagus) is a species of opossum from South America. It is found in Bolivia, Brazil, Ecuador and Peru.

Though previously regarded as a species, M. dorothea, Dorothy's slender opossum, is a synonym of M. noctivagus. On the other hand, M. ocellatus, a junior synonym of M. dorothea, is now recognized as a separate true species.
