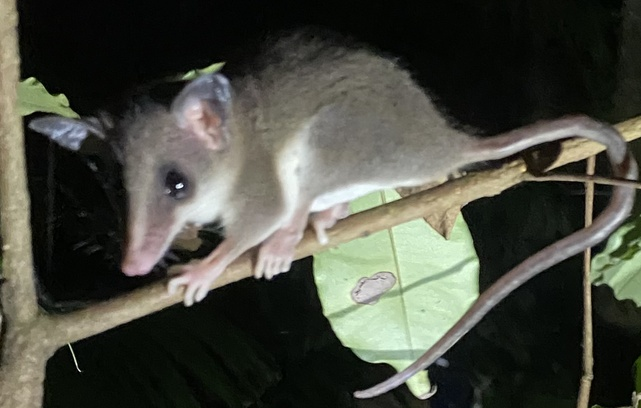

Scientific classification
- Kingdom: Animalia
- Phylum: Chordata
- Class: Mammalia
- Infraclass: Marsupialia
- Order: Didelphimorphia
- Family: Didelphidae
- Genus: Marmosops
- Species: M. carri

Binomial name
- Marmosops carri (Allen & Chapman, 1897)

Synonyms
- Marmosops fuscatus carri

= Carr's slender opossum =

Carr's slender opossum (Marmosops carri) is an opossum in the family Didelphidae. It is native to Trinidad and Tobago and Venezuela. Its back is greyish-brown and its belly is white.
