= El Piñero =

Coordinates: 41°21′N 5°35′W

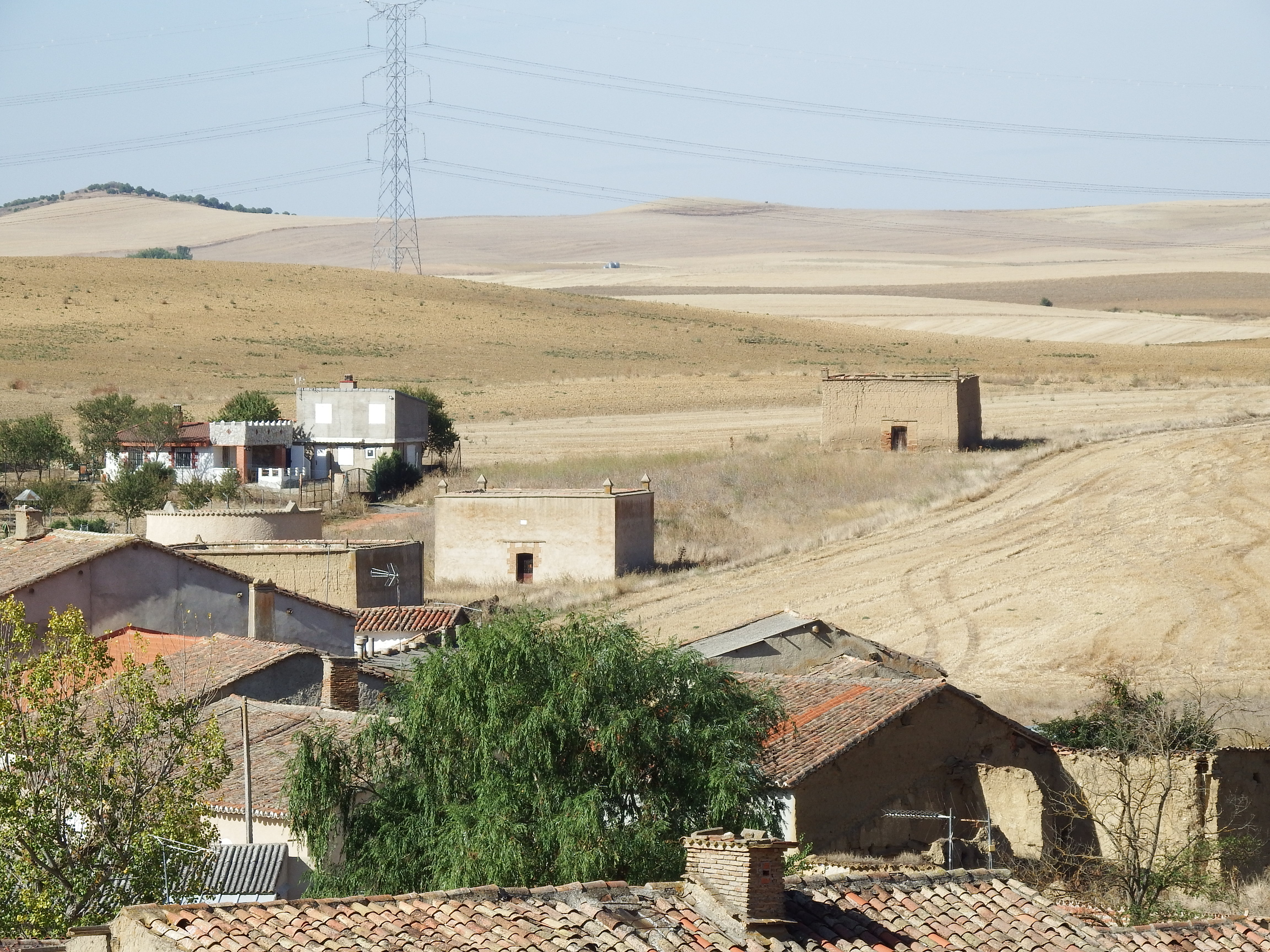

- Flag Coat of arms
- Interactive map of El Piñero
- Country: Spain
- Autonomous community: Castile and León
- Province: Zamora
- Municipality: El Piñero

Area
  - Total: 19 km^{2} (7.3 sq mi)

Population (2025-01-01)
  - Total: 210
  - Density: 11/km^{2} (29/sq mi)
- Time zone: UTC+1 (CET)
  - Summer (DST): UTC+2 (CEST)

El Piñero (Spanish pronunciation: [el piˈɲeɾo]) is a municipality located in the province of Zamora, Castile and León, Spain. According to the 2004 census (INE), the municipality has a population of 282 inhabitants.
