= H. Harold Shamel =

American zoologist

Henry Harold Shamel (26 June 1885–1963) was an American mammalogist. George Henry Hamilton Tate named a species of bat after him, Shamel's horseshoe bat (Rhinolophus shameli).

== Life ==
Shamel was born 26 June 1885 in Ellsworth County, Kansas. He was the sixth of eight children. His parents were Emily Almira Boileau and Joel Henry Shamel. He was a schoolteacher before finding employment as a stenographer at St. John Mills in 1916. In 1915, he took an examination to apply for a civil service position, receiving his assignment at the end of 1916. He started working for the National Museum of Natural History beginning in 1917. On 3 September 1937, Shamel was promoted to senior scientific aide in the National Museum's division of mammals. Shamel retired from the National Museum in 1947 due to poor health. In his later life, he wrote a genealogical history of the Gabriel family, published in 1960. He also authored Seeds of Time, A Story of the Ozarks, which was about his childhood. Shamel died in 1963.

== Species described ==
- Chacoan pygmy opossum
- Peleng leaf-nosed bat
- Myotis flavus
- Bogotá yellow-shouldered bat
