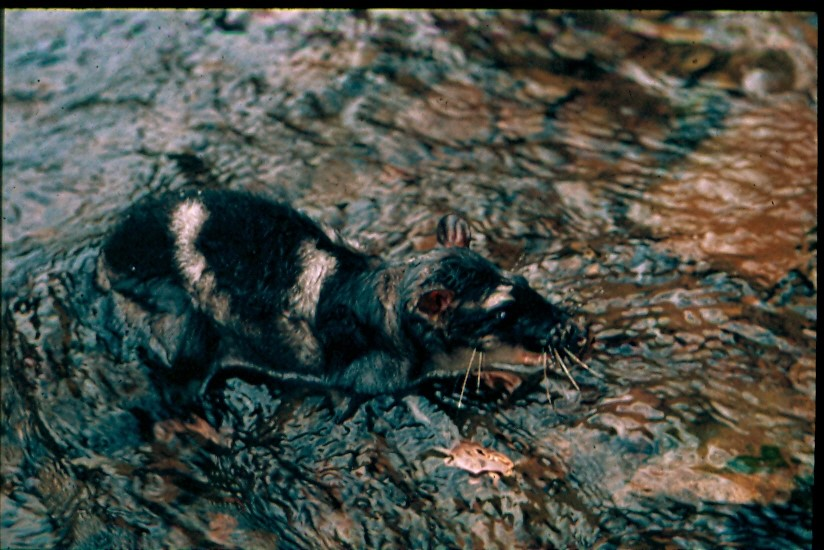

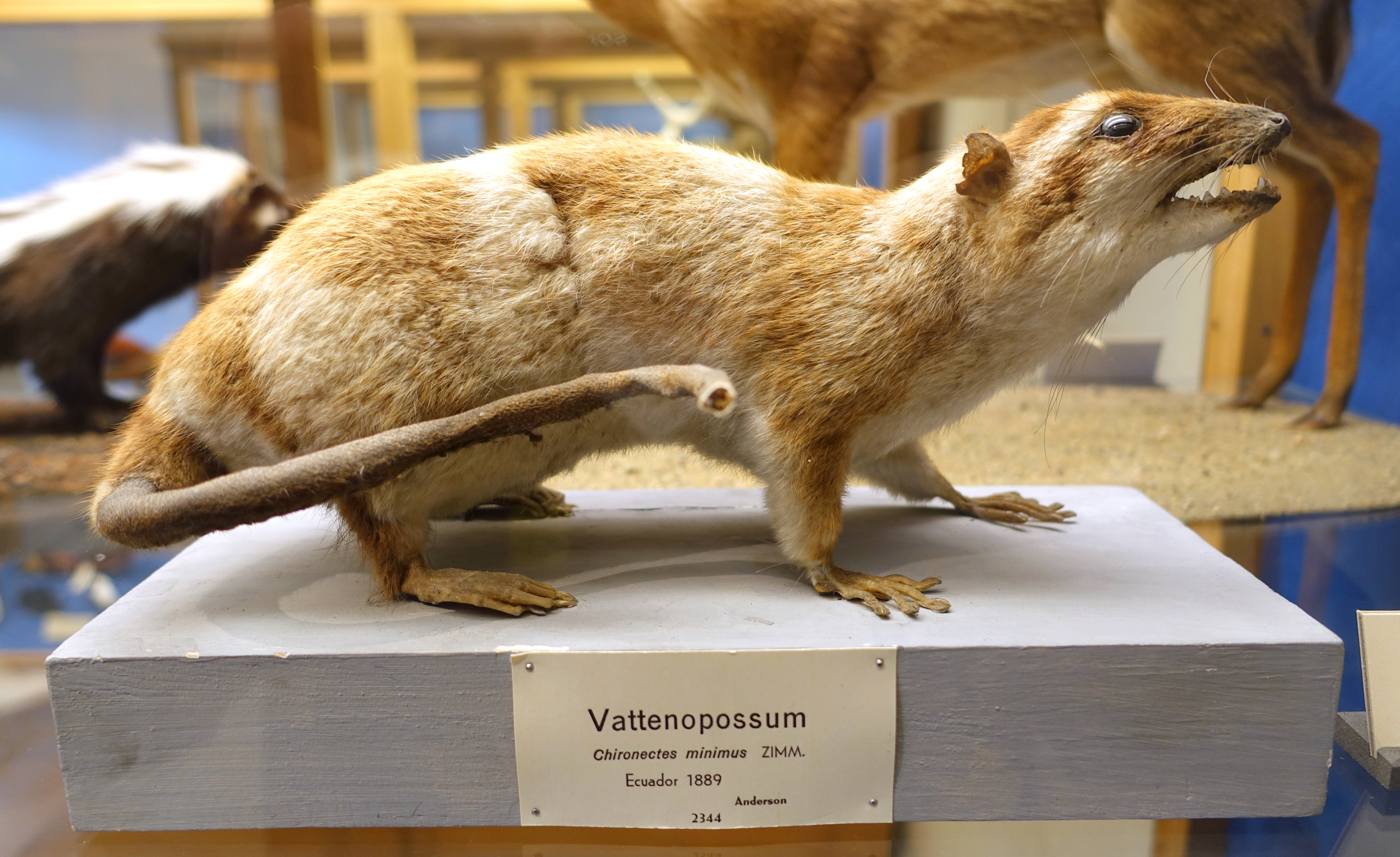
- Taxidermy, Swedish Museum of Natural History

Conservation status
- Least Concern (IUCN 3.1)

Scientific classification
- Kingdom: Animalia
- Phylum: Chordata
- Class: Mammalia
- Infraclass: Marsupialia
- Order: Didelphimorphia
- Family: Didelphidae
- Subfamily: Didelphinae
- Tribe: Didelphini
- Genus: Chironectes; Illiger, 1811
- Species: C. minimus

Binomial name
- Chironectes minimus (Zimmermann, 1780)
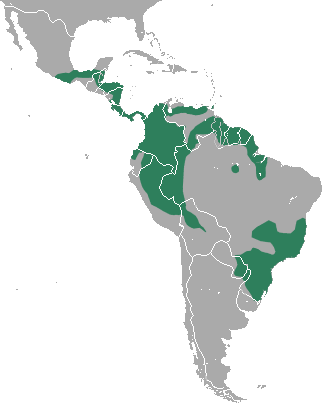
- Water opossum range

Synonyms
- List: Latra minima Zimmermann, 1780; Lutra memina Boddaert, 1784; Chironectes memina (Boddaert, 1784); Mustela (Lutra) paraguensis Kerr, 1792; Mustela (Lutra) guianensis Kerr, 1792; Lutra gujanensis Link, 1795; Lutra saricovienna G. Shaw, 1800; Mustela cayennensis Turton, 1800; Didelphis palmata Daudin, 1802; Chironectes palmata (Daudin, 1820); Lutra memia Desmarest, 1803; Lutra memmina Desmarest, 1804; Didelphis memmina (Desmarest, 1804); Sarigua memmina (Desmarest, 1804); Chironectes variegatus Illiger, 1815 nomen nudum; Didelphis lutreola Oken, 1816; Chironectes variegatus Olfers, 1818; Chironectes yapok Desmarest, 1820; Chironectes langsdorffi Boitard, 1842; Chironectes panamensis Goldman, 1914; Chironectes menima bresslaui Pohle, 1927; Chironectes argyrodytes Dickey, 1928

= Water opossum =

Species of marsupial

The water opossum (Chironectes minimus), also locally known as the yapok (/ˈjæpɒk/), is a marsupial of the family Didelphidae. It is the only monotypic species of its genus, Chironectes. This semiaquatic creature is found in and near freshwater streams and lakes from Mexico through Central and South America to Argentina and is the most aquatic living marsupial (the lutrine opossum also has semiaquatic habits). It is also the only extant marsupial species in which both sexes have a pouch. The now extinct thylacine, commonly referred to as the Tasmanian tiger, also exhibited this trait.

The local name for the water opossum, "yapok", may come from the name of the Oyapock River in French Guiana.

== Physical appearance ==
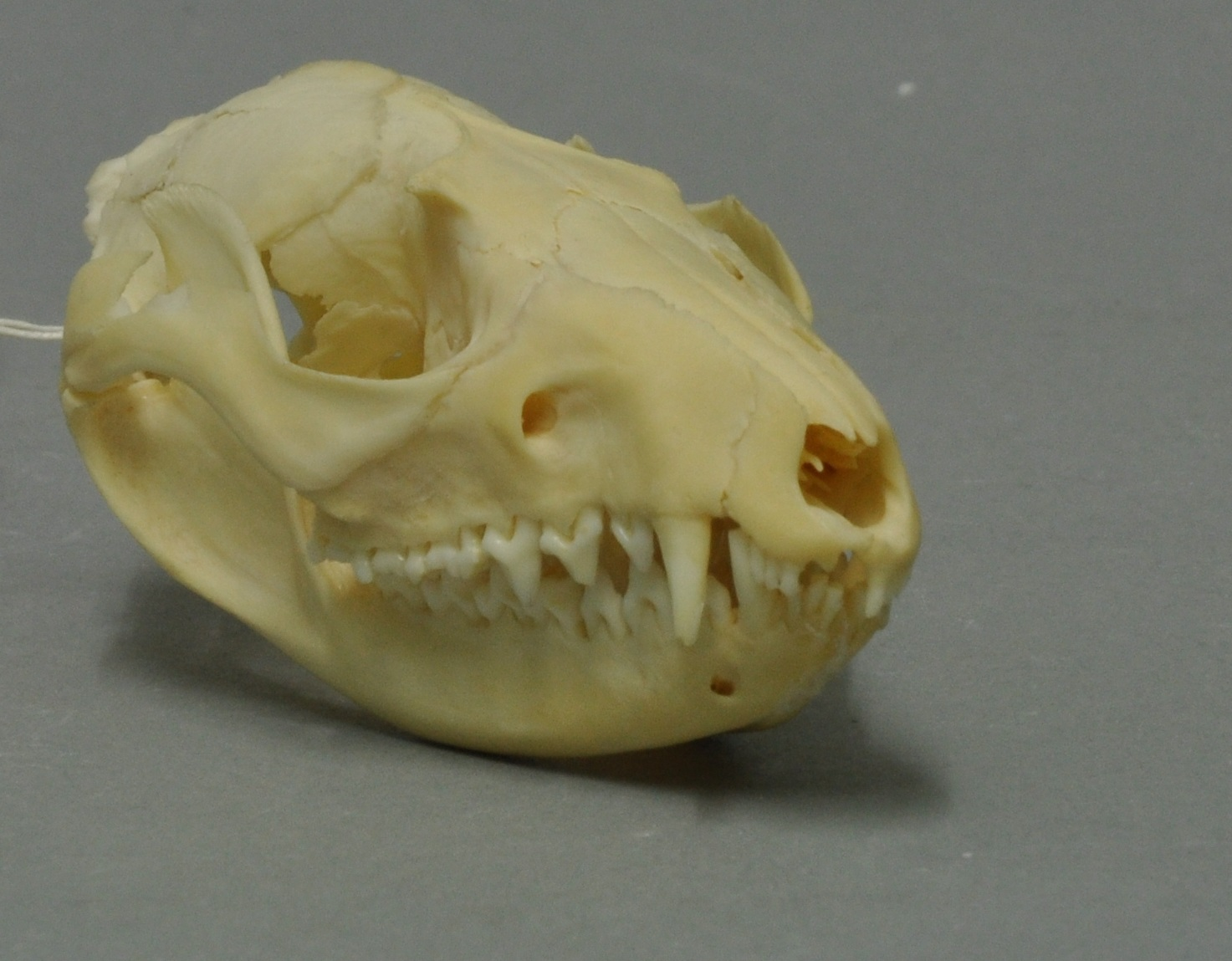
Skull of a water opossum

The water opossum is small, measuring 27–32.5 cm (10.6–12.8 in) long, with a 36–40 cm (14–16 in) long tail. The fur is in a marbled grey and black pattern, while the muzzle, eyestripe, and crown are all black. A light band runs across the forehead anterior to the ears, which are rounded and hairless. There are sensory facial bristles in tufts above each eye, as well as whiskers. The water opossum's tail, furred and black at the base, is yellow or white at its end. The hind feet of the water opossum are webbed, while the forefeet ("hands") are not. The forefeet can be used to feel for and grab prey as the animal swims, propelled by its tail and webbed back feet. Unlike other didelphids, the water opossum does not have a cloaca.

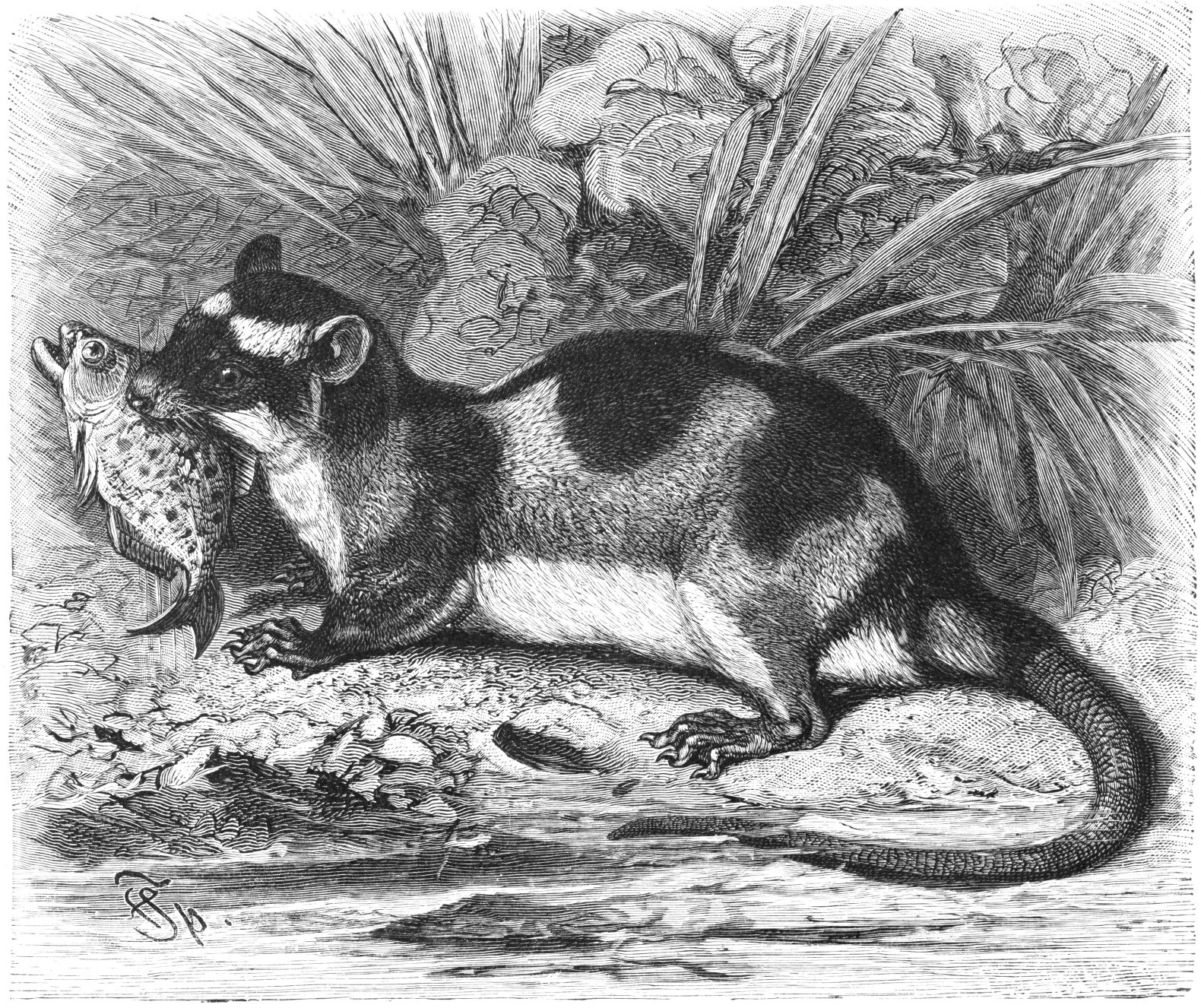
Drawing of a water opossum

== Aquatic adaptations ==
The water opossum has several adaptations for its watery lifestyle. It has short, dense fur, which is water-repellent. The broad hind feet are webbed and are used for propulsion through water, moving with alternate strokes. They are symmetrical as well, which distributes force equally along both borders of the webbing; this increases the efficiency of the water opossum's movement through the water. The water opossum's long tail also aids in swimming.

Being a marsupial and at the same time an aquatic animal, the water opossum has evolved a way to protect its young while swimming. A strong ring of muscle makes the pouch (which opens to the rear) watertight, so the young remain dry, even when the mother is totally immersed in water. The male also has a pouch (although not as watertight as the female's), where he places his genitalia before swimming. This is thought to prevent them from becoming entangled in aquatic vegetation and is probably helpful in streamlining the animal as well.

== Reproduction ==
Water opossums mate in December and a litter of 1–5 young is born 12 to 14 days later in the nest. By 22 days the offspring are beginning to show some fur, and by 40 days or so their eyes are open, their bodies protruding from the mother's pouch. At 48 days of age, the young opossums detach from the nipples, but they still nurse and sleep with the mother.

== Fossil record ==
The water opossum seems to have a history dating as far back as to the Pliocene Epoch. The first Pliocene occurrences were recorded in 1902, 1906, and 1917 when two fragments of left mandibular ramus with alveoli (characterized as MACN 2464 and MACN 3515), as well as the fragment of the distal end of a humerus (MACN 3675) were collected near the city of Parani, Entre Rios Province, Argentina. The mandibular fossils, MACN 2464 and 3515 were known to be from the water opossum because their teeth were nearly indistinguishable from living populations of the organism in present day. Additionally, water opossum teeth are characteristically different from other didelphids, likely because they are the only semi-aquatic marsupials, making these teeth easy to identify.

Holocene subfossil fragments of Chironectes have been discovered in São Paulo, Brazil. Also, there are fossil specimens from the late Pleistocene–recent cave deposits in Minas Gerais, Brazil, as well as from the late Pliocene in Entre Ríos Province, Argentina.

== Subspecies ==
- Chironectes minimus argyrodytes Dickey, 1928 - southern Mexico, Belize, Guatemala, El Salvador, Honduras, and northern Nicaragua
- Chironectes minimus paraguensis (Kerr, 1792) - southeastern Brazil, eastern Paraguay, northern Uruguay, and northeastern Argentina
- Chironectes minimus minimus Zimmermann, 1780) - southern Colombia, southern Venezuela, Guyana, Suriname, French Guiana, northern and western Brazil, much of Peru, and western Bolivia
- Chironectes minimus panamensis Goldman, 1914 - southern Nicaragua, Costa Rica, Panama, northern and western Colombia, northern Venezuela, western Ecuador, and northwestern Peru
