= Gardner's short-tailed opossum =

Scientific classification
- Kingdom: Animalia
- Phylum: Chordata
- Class: Mammalia
- Infraclass: Marsupialia
- Order: Didelphimorphia
- Family: Didelphidae
- Genus: Monodelphis
- Species: M. gardneri

Binomial name
- Monodelphis gardneri Solari, Pacheco, Vivar & Emmons, 2012

Species of marsupial

Gardner's short-tailed opossum (Monodelphis gardneri) is a marsupial mammal from South America. It was named in 2012 by Sergio Solari, Víctor Pacheco, Elena Vivar and Louise H. Emmons. They named it after Dr. Alfred L. Gardner who took the first specimen of this species.

== Description ==
Collected specimen range from 70–100 mm in head-and-body length. The fur has a Prout Brown to Mummy Brown colour with three distinctive black stripes on its back, reaching from between the ears to the base of the tail. The tail is slightly shorter than half of the head-and-body length. This species, although marsupial, has no pouch for its young.

== Habitat and ecology ==
Gardner's short-tailed opossum inhabits the montane forests on the eastern slopes of the Andes Mountains in Peru. It was found in dense to semi-open forests or even at the edge between forest and an open sphagnum bog in thickets of dense brush and bamboo. It probably is terrestrial and does not climb trees.

Other members of the genus Monodelphis are omnivorous or carnivorous, feeding on insects.
