= One-striped opossum =

Conservation status
- Critically endangered, possibly extinct (IUCN 3.1)

Scientific classification
- Kingdom: Animalia
- Phylum: Chordata
- Class: Mammalia
- Infraclass: Marsupialia
- Order: Didelphimorphia
- Family: Didelphidae
- Genus: Monodelphis
- Species: M. unistriata

Binomial name
- Monodelphis unistriata (Wagner, 1842)
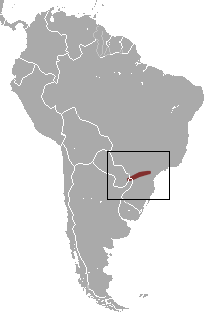
- One-striped opossum range

Species of marsupial

The one-striped opossum (Monodelphis unistriata) is a possibly extinct opossum species from South America. It is known only from two specimens found in Brazil in 1821 and Argentina in 1899.
