= Dusky slender opossum =

Conservation status
- Data Deficient (IUCN 3.1)

Scientific classification
- Kingdom: Animalia
- Phylum: Chordata
- Class: Mammalia
- Infraclass: Marsupialia
- Order: Didelphimorphia
- Family: Didelphidae
- Genus: Marmosops
- Species: M. fuscatus

Binomial name
- Marmosops fuscatus (Thomas, 1896)
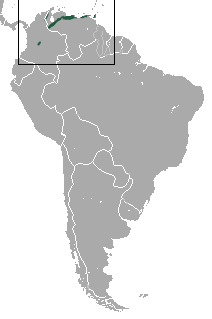
- Dusky slender opossum range

Synonyms
- M. carri (J. A. Allen and Chapman, 1897); M. perfuscus (Thomas, 1924)

Species of marsupial

The dusky slender opossum (Marmosops fuscatus) is a species of opossum in the family Didelphidae. It is found in Colombia, Trinidad and Tobago, and Venezuela. It is threatened by habitat loss.
