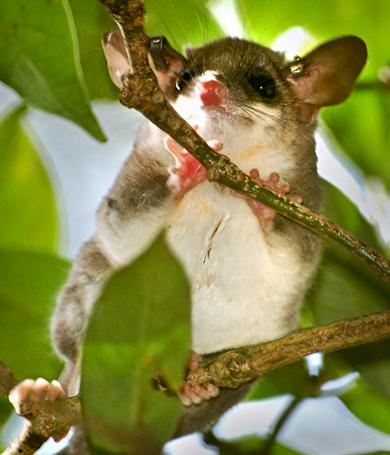
- Gray slender opossum (M. incanus)

Scientific classification
- Kingdom: Animalia
- Phylum: Chordata
- Class: Mammalia
- Infraclass: Marsupialia
- Order: Didelphimorphia
- Family: Didelphidae
- Subfamily: Didelphinae
- Tribe: Thylamyini
- Genus: Marmosops; Matschie 1916

Type species
- Didelphis incana Lund, 1840

Species
- See text

= Marmosops =

Genus of marsupials

Marmosops is a genus of Neotropical opossums of the family Didelphidae. The genus was originally treated as a subgenus from the genus Marmosa rather than having their own classification. This was changed in 1989 by Gardner and Crieghton, who officially separated the group and made them their own genus. The mix-up between to genera Marmosa and Marmosops was common due to the similar appearances including size and other external features. However, the two groups differ significantly in their integument and in the arrangement of their skull and dentition. The dentition is similar in morphology between the two groups, with the exception of the deciduous lower third premolar varying from one genus to the next. The similarity between the two continues to cause the genus Marmosops to be frequently misidentified due to the lack of knowledge regarding the species along with the overlooked traits that help separate them from other opossums. The Marmosops are also commonly confused with the genus Gracilinanus, but this is quickly ruled out by a large number of differing characteristics. These differences include the arrangement of their digits, caudal (anatomical term) scales, and the central hair on the scales changing from a three hairs per follicle to many more. This causes the hair of the Gracilinanus to be thicker and has also found to be heavily pigmented. The last group commonly confused with Marmosops is known as the genus Thylamys. These animals have a contrasting dorsal body pelage and the taxa are actually quite different.

== Phylogeny ==
According to Ribeiro et al (2025), the relations of Marmosops are as follows:

- - Marmosops
    - (Marmosops)
      - - M. incanus
        - M. paulensis
      - - - M. caucae
          - - M. noctivagus
            - M. creightoni
        - M. ocellatus
    - (Sciophanes)
      - - M. bishopi
        - - - M. parvidens
            - M. pakaraimae
          - - M. pinheiroi
            - M. marina
      - - - M. fuscatus
          - M. carri
        - M. handleyi
  - Monodelphis

=== Species list ===
The genus Marmosops includes the following species:

- Bishop's slender opossum (M. bishopi)
- Carr's slender opossum (M. carri)
- Cauca slender opossum (M. caucae)
- Cordillera slender opossum (M. chucha)
- Creighton's slender opossum (M. creightoni)
- Dusky slender opossum (M. fuscatus)
- Handley's slender opossum (M. handleyi)
- Gray slender opossum (M. incanus)
- Panama slender opossum (M. invictus)
- Junin slender opossum (M. juninensis)
- Rio Magdalena slender opossum (M. magdalenae)
- Silva's slender opossum (M. marina)
- White-bellied slender opossum (M. noctivagus)
- Spectacled slender opossum (M. ocellatus)
- Ojasti's slender opossum (M. ojastii)
- Pantepui slender opossum (M. pakaraimae)
- Delicate slender opossum (M. parvidens)
- Brazilian slender opossum (M. paulensis)
- Pinheiro's slender opossum (M. pinheiroi)
- Soini's slender opossom (M. soinii)
- Woodall's slender opossum (M. woodalli)

Some species are recognized by the Mammal Species of the World, but not by the American Society of Mammalogists:

- Narrow-headed slender opossum (M. cracens) nomen dubium, synonymized with M. fuscatus
- Dorothy's slender opossum (M. dorothea) synonym of M. noctivagus
- Tschudi's slender opossum (M. impavidus) synonym of M. caucae
- Neblina slender opossum (M. neblina) synonym of M. caucae

== General traits ==
The Marmosops tend to be nocturnal, small marsupials and have been found to live on the ground. Many females of the M. paulensis species are known to be extremely territorial with a strong defense of their food, especially while in the presence of their young. The genus Marmosops is frequently misidentified and lumped into groups containing other species. As of today, Marmosops are currently recognized as a distinct taxon with 36 taxa: 14 valid species and 22 subspecies. The species within the genus differ slightly, but not enough to be classified as separate genera. Some of the species are also nicknamed by appearance, with the M. paulensis known as the slender opossum, the M. noctivagus recognized as the largest species and the M. bishopi the smallest of the genus.

== Habitat ==
The main habitat for the Marmosops is found between the Neotropical humid forests ranging from Panama to the South of Brazil and sometimes in Bolivia as well. The Marmosops prefer to live on the grounds of forests, staying away from high branches of trees. They often hide in the dense understory with high plant coverage surrounding them. They are highly influenced by rain and predation, with migration occurring more often during certain seasons. The genus is never found to live up in a canopy (biology) or in the trees, but instead typically prefer more accessible habitats where it is easier to hide. There is not much known regarding the habitat of the genus due to their migration patterns and unique preferences.

== Diet ==
The diet of Marmosops includes, but is not limited to fruit, arthropods, flowers and small vertebrates. They also will eat insects, arachnids, and gastropods depending on the species and time of the year. Their diet seems to change with the seasons, with more diversity in food preference shown in the drier seasons. Each species has a slightly different diet depending on their habitat and what is available in that area.

== Reproduction ==
Most of the Marmosops carry their offspring in utero and feed them through the process of lactation. There is a high reproduction rate in the months of September through March for M. paulensis, with more mating occurring when there is a larger food supply. For this species, death occurred after every mating event was completed. This ensured that there was no more than one mating event for each animal that reproduced. Successful breeding depends on the presence of females, and many may have multiple mating partners in order to produce more offspring if they do not die after one event. The M. paulensis species have higher breeding rates when the length of day is longer and there is more fruit available to eat. Semelparity also was found to occur in this species, but is hypothesized to occur only due to phylogenic constraints. It seems as though there is synchrony of the females for the species due to swollen nipples around the time of breeding. The M. incanus have also been found to exhibit semelparity with a distinct breeding season between the months of October through December. For the breeding season, it is more beneficial for the females to be larger in order to produce larger litters, yielding higher breeding success over the smaller sized females. When looking at milk production and food supply for the genus, there was a strong correlation found between the two as well. In times where there was more food, there was more milk produced by the females. As far as the males, they seem to generally disappear after the mating event while the females remain in the area until their young are done weaning. This pattern leads to the generations being replaced every breeding season due to mortality of the adults. Overall, there is not much known about the reproductive patterns of the other species due to the little knowledge collected on the genus as a whole. There is a lack of pouch.

== Species-specific information ==
The Marmosops noctivagus species have been involved in a big debate on which Genus they belong to. One study found them located in Columbia, which was previously an unknown location as far as Marmosops are concerned. They were identified by the chestnut brown hair on their back and white hair on their ventral side along with black facial features. They also have long tails with two different colors. The M. noctivagus also has a skull with a long nose and cranial openings between the squamosal and parietal bones. This is present in some of the animals and absent in others. The cranial openings under the squamosal bones, also known as fenestra (anatomy), are small and rounded. The dental arrangement for the species consists of large canine teeth but lack accessory cusps, correlating with the age and sex of the animal. These teeth are significantly smaller in the females. The Marmosops bishopi are another species of the genus Marmosops found in the western Brazilian Amazon rainforest and other areas of Peru and Bolivia. Marmosops incanus are another species in the genus that have a mask made of black fur around their eyes. Some other distinguishing characteristics include the third digit being longer than the second and the fourth along with an extremely long tail. They do not have a fenestra on the maxilla, but the fenestra cochlea is exposed The Marmosops creightoni is a species that is medium in size with a coat that is almost completely dark with no clear distinction between the dorsal and ventral sides. This is the only species of the genus without the white markings on the underside. The chin fur is white and continues down to the throat along with a black mask around the eyes. The skull consists of small orbits with long nasal bones and the infraorbital foramen is very large. This species has a fenestra between the maxilla and palatine bone, which are both long and narrow on each side. The palatine fenestra are rather small in size. The M. handleyi is one last species with very little known about it. However, rather recently there has been new information uncovered. The species is characterized by its woody dorsal fur, gray ventral fur and a rounded palatine fenestra. They are intermediately sized compared to the rest of the genus and have dark black facial masks. They were found to lack throat glands as well. They have white or light gray ears and the females are unique due to the odd rusty-red color of their mammary area with seven nipples located on the abdominal region.
