= Narrow-headed slender opossum =

Conservation status
- Data Deficient (IUCN 3.1)

Scientific classification
- Kingdom: Animalia
- Phylum: Chordata
- Class: Mammalia
- Infraclass: Marsupialia
- Order: Didelphimorphia
- Family: Didelphidae
- Genus: Marmosops
- Species: M. cracens

Binomial name
- Marmosops cracens Handley & Gordon, 1979
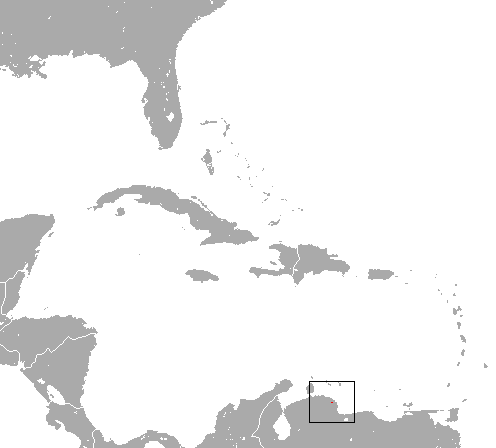
- Narrow-headed slender opossum range

Species of marsupial

The narrow-headed slender opossum (Marmosops cracens) is a species of opossum in the family Didelphidae. It is endemic to Venezuela.
