= Tschudi's slender opossum =

Conservation status
- Least Concern (IUCN 3.1)

Scientific classification
- Kingdom: Animalia
- Phylum: Chordata
- Class: Mammalia
- Infraclass: Marsupialia
- Order: Didelphimorphia
- Family: Didelphidae
- Genus: Marmosops
- Species: M. caucae

Binomial name
- Marmosops caucae (Tschudi, 1844)
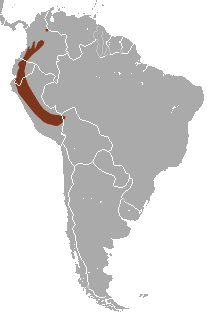
- Combined range of Tschudi's and Andean slender opossums

Species of marsupial

Tschudi's slender opossum (Marmosops caucae) is an opossum species from South America, named after Swiss naturalist Johann Jakob von Tschudi. It is found in Bolivia, Brazil, Colombia, Ecuador, Paraguay, Peru and Venezuela.
