= Alfred Lunt Gardner =

American zoologist (born 1937)

- Born: November 10, 1937 (age 88); Salem, Massachusetts, United States
- Education: University of Arizona; Louisiana State University
- Known for: Taxonomy and systematics of mammals in the Americas; editor of Mammals of South America
- Scientific career
- Fields: Mammalogy
- Workplaces: National Museum of Natural History, Louisiana State University, Tulane University
- Doctoral advisor: George H. Lowery

Alfred Lunt Gardner often referenced as Alfred L. Gardner (born November 10, 1937) is an American mammalogist.

== Biography ==
Gardner is the son of Waldo J. and Ruth L. Gardner and has a twin brother. He spent his early childhood in Salem on Gallows Hill until the third grade. In 1947, his family moved to a farm in North Andover, Massachusetts. From 1949, he became interested in hunting and trapping, and as a freshman at Danvers High School in Danvers, Massachusetts, he sold his first pelt. In 1953, the family relocated to Tucson, Arizona. Initially, Gardner planned to skip high school to work in a supermarket, but his father demanded his weekly paycheck, prompting him to reconsider the value of education. He graduated from Tucson Senior High School in June 1955. In March 1955, he was drafted into the United States Army, serving with the 24th Tank Battalion, 96th Infantry Division. He completed basic training at Fort Ord, California, in June 1955, attended a tank summer camp at Camp Irwin in August, and in September 1955 enrolled at the University of Arizona to study wildlife management.

In fall 1957, his priorities shifted after taking a course in mammalogy, where he learned to capture bats and rats and to prepare museum specimens. The following spring he worked as a welder. On a field trip, he discovered a bat colony, which led to active participation in a bat-banding program directed by E. Lendell Cockrum. In spring 1959, he combined night welding shifts with daytime study until June 1959, when he joined collecting expeditions to Mexico, bringing back many mammal specimens, especially bats. He received his Bachelor of Science in 1961 from the University of Arizona. After another year of collecting in Mexico, he began a master's degree in zoology at the University of Arizona in 1963, graduating in 1965. In 1965, he began doctoral studies in zoology at Louisiana State University. He spent the summers of 1966 and 1968 in an Indigenous village in eastern Peru and part of 1966 and 1967 in Costa Rica. In August 1970, he earned his Ph.D. with the dissertation The Systematics of the genus Didelphis (Marsupialia: Didelphidae) in North and Middle America under the supervision of George H. Lowery.

From 1970 to 1971, Gardner held a postdoctoral position at the M.D. Anderson Hospital and Tumor Institute in Houston, Texas. He then served as assistant professor at Louisiana State University (1972–1973) and Tulane University (1973) in New Orleans. In May 1973, he became curator at the Division of Birds and Mammals, National Museum of Natural History, Smithsonian Institution.

Gardner's research includes the taxonomy, morphology, genetics, distribution, diet, ecology, and nomenclature of mammals of the Western Hemisphere. His work synthesizes fieldwork, museum specimen research, and published literature, especially from the late 18th to early 20th centuries.

In 2005, Gardner authored the sections on opossums, mouse opossums, the Chiloé opossum, armadillos, and xenarthrans in the 3rd edition of Mammal Species of the World. In 2008, he edited Mammals of South America, Volume 1: Marsupials, Xenarthrans, Shrews, and Bats. In 2014, he co-authored the List of Recent Land Mammals of Mexico. He has contributed to the descriptions of more than 25 new species of opossums, bats, and rodents from the Neotropics. In 2010, he was elected an honorary member of the American Society of Mammalogists.

== Eponymous taxa ==
Several species and genera have been named in Gardner's honor, including:

- Proechimys gardneri (da Silva, 1998)
- Rhipidomys gardneri (Patton, da Silva & Malcolm, 2000)
- Monodelphis gardneri (Solari, Pacheco, Vivar & Emmons, 2012)
- Gardnerycteris (Hurtado & Pacheco, 2014)
- Peromyscus gardneri (Lorenzo, Álvarez-Castañeda, Pérez-Consuegra & Patton, 2016)
