= Handley's slender opossum =

Conservation status
- Critically Endangered (IUCN 3.1)

Scientific classification
- Kingdom: Animalia
- Phylum: Chordata
- Class: Mammalia
- Infraclass: Marsupialia
- Order: Didelphimorphia
- Family: Didelphidae
- Genus: Marmosops
- Species: M. handleyi

Binomial name
- Marmosops handleyi (Pine, 1981)
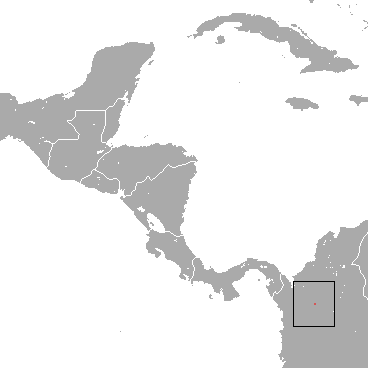
- Handley's slender opossum range

Species of marsupial

Handley's slender opossum (Marmosops handleyi) is a species of opossum in the family Didelphidae. It is endemic to Colombia.
