= Spectacled slender opossum =

Conservation status
- Least Concern (IUCN 3.1)

Scientific classification
- Kingdom: Animalia
- Phylum: Chordata
- Class: Mammalia
- Infraclass: Marsupialia
- Order: Didelphimorphia
- Family: Didelphidae
- Genus: Marmosops
- Species: M. ocellatus

Binomial name
- Marmosops ocellatus (Tate, 1931)
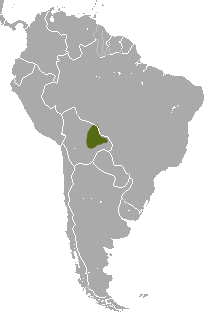
- Spectacled slender opossum range

Species of marsupial

The spectacled slender opossum (Marmosops ocellatus), also known as the little spotted slender opossum, is a species in the marsupial genus Marmosops from South America.

== Description ==
Marmosops ocellatus has sandy grayish-brown dorsal fur and self-cream that lacks distinct lateral zones of gray-based hairs. The tail is distinctly bicolored (dark above, pale below) and particolored (paler distally than proximally), such that the distal one-third or more of the organ is completely pale in most specimens. Individuals can range from 20 to 40 g (0.71 to 1.41 oz) in weight.

== Ecology and population ==
The spectacled slender opossum inhabits the Chiquitania dry forest, a transitional zone between the Cerrado savannah and Amazon rainforest in central and eastern Bolivia and western Brazil. It is found in mature, disturbed, and secondary forests. This species feeds on insects and fruit. It is nocturnal and can climb very well.

Currently Marmosops ocellatus is listed as "least concern" by the IUCN because of its wide distribution, adaptation to human interference, and occurrence in a number of protected areas.
