= Patagonian opossum =

Conservation status
- Least Concern (IUCN 3.1)

Scientific classification
- Kingdom: Animalia
- Phylum: Chordata
- Class: Mammalia
- Infraclass: Marsupialia
- Order: Didelphimorphia
- Family: Didelphidae
- Subfamily: Didelphinae
- Tribe: Thylamyini
- Genus: Lestodelphys; Tate, 1934
- Species: L. halli

Binomial name
- Lestodelphys halli (Thomas, 1921)
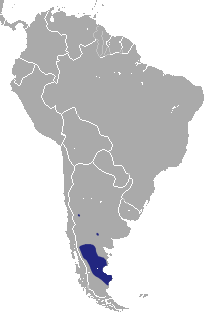
- Patagonian opossum range

Species of marsupial

The Patagonian opossum (Lestodelphys halli) is the sole species in genus Lestodelphys.

== Distribution ==
The Patagonian opossum occurs further south, in Argentina, than any other living marsupial. Although distributed throughout some parts of southern Argentina, it is one of the least known mammals of South America. They have been spotted near Monte Phytogeographic Province, and in Patagonia Phytogeographic Province, yet there are no records of Patagonian opossums in central Patagonia, which leads mammalogists to believe that they can only live in the Patagonian steppe. There are two areas in the Patagonian steppe where these animals are often found: the province of La Pampa and Choele Choel (northern Rio Negro Province).

== Form ==
It is suggested that the Patagonian opossum may have emerged from the same ancestral group as Marmosa. They resemble each other closely. In the winter both types have similarly thickening at the base of the tails, where fat accumulates. Yet they do not share all aspects of their lifestyle; Patagonian opossums have a specialized way to gather and consume food, which is made possible by the shortening of their skull and jaws. The shortening occurs in the premolar region; this gives the Patagonian opossum increased biting power.

== General characteristics ==
The general appearance of the Patagonian opossum is similar to that of mouse opossums, except they have specialized features due to their predatorial way of life. Unlike mouse opossums, their skull has a reduced muzzle, wider zygomatic arch, as well as a crowded premolar region. Patagonian opossums have rather short fur, that are fine and soft. Their fur are usually gray, with the posterior being dark gray, the sides being a paler shade of gray, their shoulders are dark and their cheeks as well are eye region are white in color. Their ears are short, they are a pink flesh color, with the base of their ears being white. Their tails are much shorter than their head and their body.

== Dentition ==
The Patagonian opossum has generally 50 teeth. 18 incisors, 4 canines, 12 premolars, and 16 molars. Their canine is exceptionally long, and they are almost completely straight and vertical. The first pair of incisors is set aside from the other incisors, yet all of the incisors remain the same size. Incisor number 1,3,4 on the bottom jaw are curved at the base, while incisor number 2 is straight. The premolars increase in size from the first premolar to the third premolar. The first premolar is very reduced in size compared to the other premolars. The premolars also have a distinct set of cusp on them called the posterobasal cusp. Their molars are extremely long, combine all the length of the premolar and it will barely exceed the length of the first two molars. The upper molars are narrow in size, compared to any of the other living opossums.

== Diet ==
Being a member of the Didelphidae (opossums), Patagonian opossums feed mainly on insects and fruits, yet insects and fruits are fairly rare in far-southern habitats. The shortage of fruits and insects in southern regions has led the Patagonian opossum to feed on mainly birds and mice. One specimen of Patagonian opossum was caught using a dead bird as bait; this led some researchers to believe that the Patagonian opossum lives totally on birds.
