= Panama slender opossum =

Conservation status
- Least Concern (IUCN 3.1)

Scientific classification
- Kingdom: Animalia
- Phylum: Chordata
- Class: Mammalia
- Infraclass: Marsupialia
- Order: Didelphimorphia
- Family: Didelphidae
- Genus: Marmosops
- Species: M. invictus

Binomial name
- Marmosops invictus (Goldman, 1912)
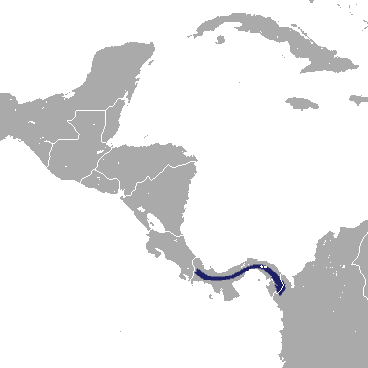
- Panama slender opossum range

Species of marsupial

The Panama slender opossum (Marmosops invictus), also known as the slaty slender mouse opossum, is a species of opossum in the family Didelphidae. It is endemic to Panama, where it has been found in tropical rainforest habitats, including disturbed areas, at elevations from 500 to 1,500 m (1,600 to 4,900 ft). This opossum is mostly terrestrial in its habits, and feeds on plants and insects. It is vulnerable to deforestation.
