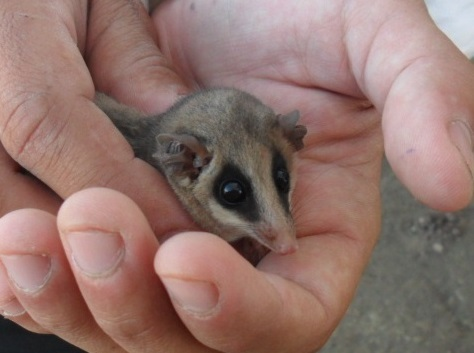
- T. canescens, Islas Marías.
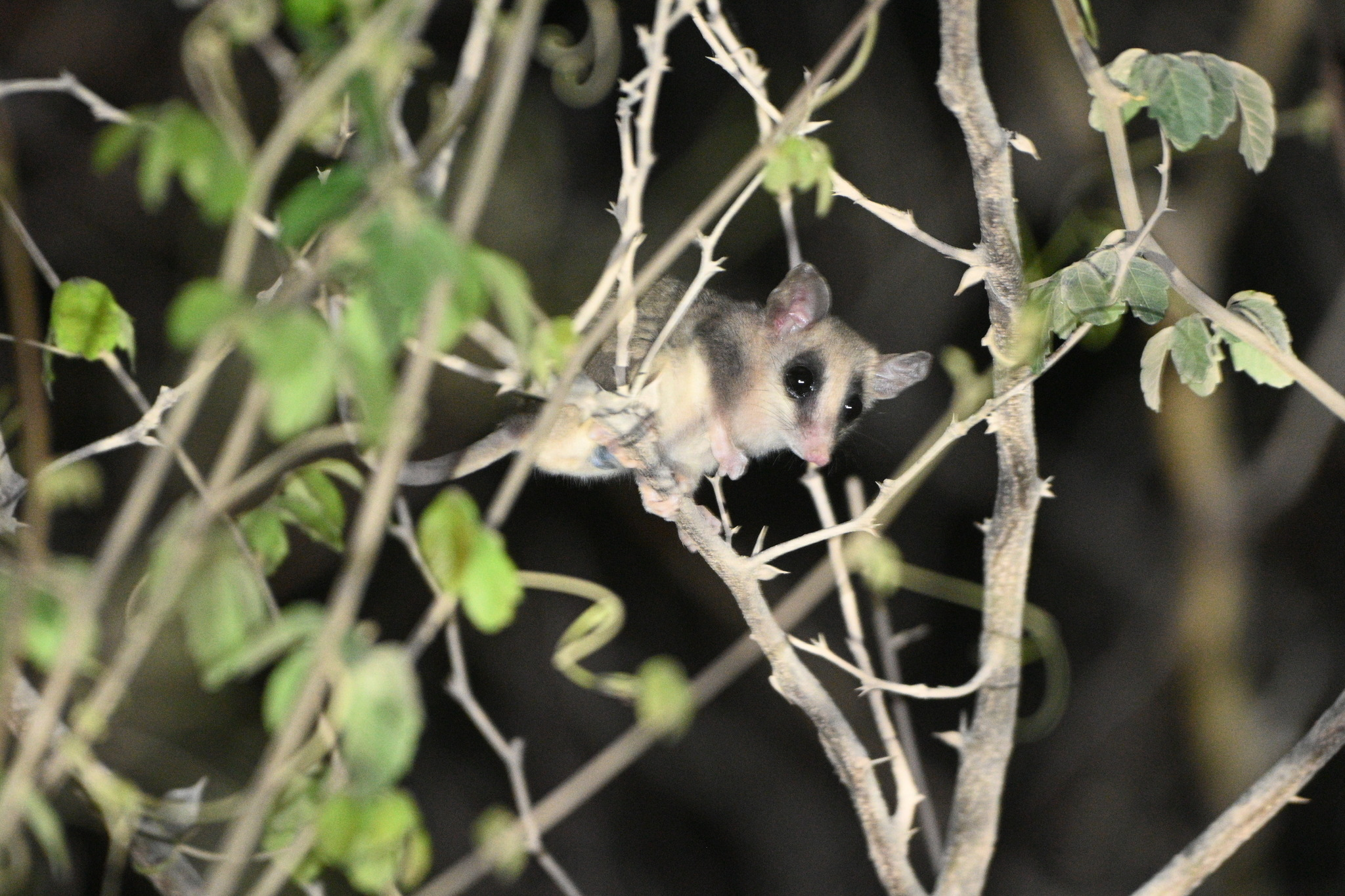
- T. canescens, Oaxaca, Mexico.

Conservation status
- Least Concern (IUCN 3.1)

Scientific classification
- Kingdom: Animalia
- Phylum: Chordata
- Class: Mammalia
- Infraclass: Marsupialia
- Order: Didelphimorphia
- Family: Didelphidae
- Subfamily: Didelphinae
- Tribe: Marmosini
- Genus: Tlacuatzin; Voss & Jansa, 2003
- Species: T. canescens

Binomial name
- Tlacuatzin canescens (J. A. Allen, 1893)
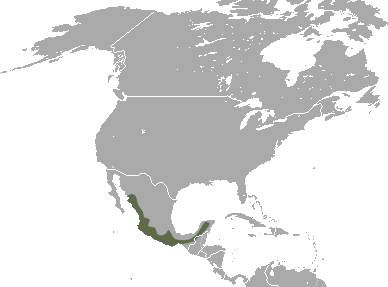
- Grayish mouse opossum range

Synonyms
- Marmosa canescens (J. A. Allen, 1893); Didelphis canescens J. A. Allen, 1893

= Grayish mouse opossum =

Species of marsupial

The grayish or gray mouse opossum (Tlacuatzin canescens) is a diminutive species of opossum in the family Didelphidae, endemic to Mexico. It is the sole species of its genus, Tlacuatzin, although some sources disagree with this.

== Description ==
The grayish mouse opossum is an unusually small opossum, measuring 20 to 35 cm (7.9 to 13.8 in) in total length, including an 11- to 16-cm (4.3- to 6.3-in) tail. Adults weigh from 38 to 60 g (1.3 to 2.1 oz). The body is covered in short, soft fur, with a slightly woolly texture. As the common name suggests, the fur is pale to brownish grey in colour, fading to white or near-white on the under parts and legs. In addition, clearly visible rings of black hair occur around the eyes, and, on females, patches of orange fur in the groin region, sometimes extending to the thighs and up the midline almost to the throat.

The whiskers are relatively short, and the ears are rounded, hairless, and dark in colour. The tail is long and prehensile, and hairless for almost all of its length, apart from the base. Females have nine teats, but, unlike many other marsupials, do not have a pouch.

== Distribution and habitat ==
Tlacuatzin candescens is native to Mexico, mainly from southern Sonora state, in the north, south to Oaxaca, with populations also found on the Islas Marías and in central Yucatán. It occupies seasonally arid habitats, especially mixed deciduous forests, but also scrub, grassland, and agricultural land. It has been reported up to elevations of 2,100 m (6,900 ft), although it is more commonly found below 1,000 m (3,300 ft). Two subspecies are currently recognised:

- Tlacuatzin c. canescens – Majority of range
- Tlacuatzin c. gaumeri – Yucatán Peninsula

The main threats to the grayish mouse opossum are deforestation and competition with introduced species, such as Rattus rattus, known more commonly as the black rat.

== Biology and behaviour ==
The grayish mouse opossum is solitary and semi-arboreal, being more terrestrial in its habits than other didelphids. They reportedly travel no more than 72 m (236 ft) between feeding sites, suggesting a small home range. Population densities have been reported to range from 0.4 to 4.5 per hectare (0.16 to 1.82/acre). The species has an omnivorous diet, but feeds mainly on insects such as bugs, cockroaches, moths and beetles (and their larvae). It occasionally feeds on small lizards and bird eggs, and also feeds on fruits, such as figs, bananas, plantains, coconuts, or citrus. Predators include many owls, such as the barn owl, and some other birds of prey, domestic cats, jaguarundi, margay, ocelots, pumas and larger snakes.

A nocturnal animal, the grayish mouse opossum spends its days resting in its nest, generally within forks or hollows of trees, bushes or cacti, or wedged between rock crevices. The nests are globular-shaped, constructed of leaves, stems, and other vegetation, and lined with finer pieces of grass and plant fibres, such as the "cotton"-like material obtained from kapok (Ceiba pentandra) trees. They may also reuse the abandoned hanging nests of orioles or wrens.

Breeding occurs in late summer and early autumn. The animals mate while hanging upside down from their tails, with the male tightly holding onto the female's neck with its jaws. The litter size ranges from 8 to 14. The young attach themselves to teats shortly after birth, and are sheltered by a pouch-like layer of hair, in the absence of a true pouch. The young leave the nest once they reach about 20 g (0.7 oz) in weight.

== Parasites ==
Not many parasites have been recorded from the grayish mouse opossum. The pinworm Tlacuatzoxyuris simpsoni (Nematoda, Oxyuridae), a parasite of the cecum, has been described in 2019.
