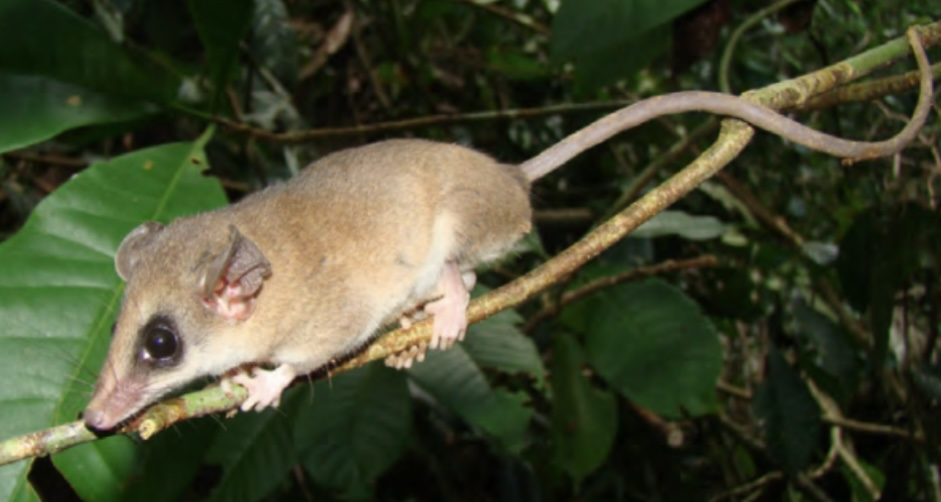
- Bishop's slender opossum climbing across a branch

Conservation status
- Least Concern (IUCN 3.1)

Scientific classification
- Kingdom: Animalia
- Phylum: Chordata
- Class: Mammalia
- Infraclass: Marsupialia
- Order: Didelphimorphia
- Family: Didelphidae
- Genus: Marmosops
- Species: M. bishopi

Binomial name
- Marmosops bishopi Pine, 1981
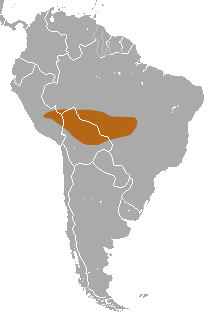
- Bishop's slender opossum range

Synonyms
- Marmosa parvidens bishopi Pine, 1981

= Bishop's slender opossum =

Species of marsupial

Bishop's slender opossum (Marmosops bishopi) is a small, arboreal marsupial in the opossum family native to Brazil, Peru, and Bolivia. It somewhat resembles a placental rat or shrew.

== Description ==
It is one of the smallest members of the genus Marmosops. It weighs 17-22 grams.

== Distribution and habitat ==
Bishop's slender opossum is found on the eastern slopes of the Andes in Bolivia and Peru. There are also isolated reports of it occurring in the lowlands of Bolivia and Brazil.

It has been found in dry forests, rainforests, evergreen forests, and cloud forests.
