= Junin slender opossum =

Conservation status
- Vulnerable (IUCN 3.1)

Scientific classification
- Kingdom: Animalia
- Phylum: Chordata
- Class: Mammalia
- Infraclass: Marsupialia
- Order: Didelphimorphia
- Family: Didelphidae
- Genus: Marmosops
- Species: M. juninensis

Binomial name
- Marmosops juninensis (Tate, 1931)
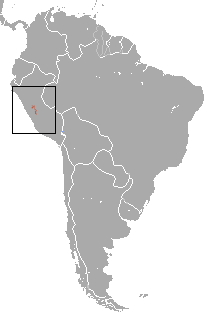
- Junin slender opossum range

Species of marsupial

The Junin slender opossum (Marmosops juninensis) is a species of South American opossum in the family Didelphidae. It is known only from the valley of the Chanchamayu in Peru (a range that includes Junín Region) where it lives in Andean montane forests at elevations between 1460 and 2200 m. The species is threatened by destruction of its forest habitat as the area under cultivation in the region increases.
