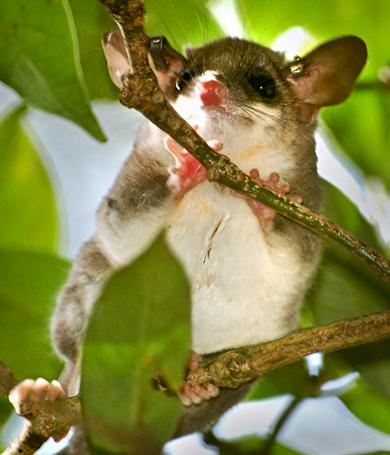

Conservation status
- Least Concern (IUCN 3.1)

Scientific classification
- Kingdom: Animalia
- Phylum: Chordata
- Class: Mammalia
- Infraclass: Marsupialia
- Order: Didelphimorphia
- Family: Didelphidae
- Genus: Marmosops
- Species: M. incanus

Binomial name
- Marmosops incanus (Lund, 1841)
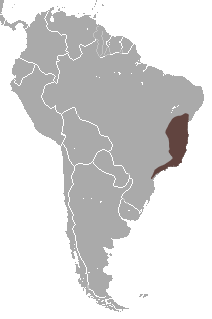
- Gray slender opossum range

= Gray slender opossum =

Species of marsupial

The gray slender opossum (Marmosops incanus), is an opossum species endemic to eastern Brazil. It is a semi-arboreal marsupial of the genus Marmosops. It is solitary and nocturnal, and its diet consists mainly of insects.

== Distribution and habitat ==
The gray slender opossum is endemic to Brazil, occurring between Bahia and São Paulo. It is found in the tropical and humid Atlantic Forest and the dry Brazilian Highlands up to 1,300 metres above sea level.

== Behaviour and ecology ==
The gray slender opossum is solitary and nocturnal. It is scansorial, moving on average 67% on the ground, and has low mobility.

It is considered to be insectivorous, with a diet consisting mainly of beetles and orthopterans (e.g., grasshoppers).
