= Tyler's mouse opossum =

Conservation status
- Data Deficient (IUCN 3.1)

Scientific classification
- Kingdom: Animalia
- Phylum: Chordata
- Class: Mammalia
- Infraclass: Marsupialia
- Order: Didelphimorphia
- Family: Didelphidae
- Genus: Marmosa
- Subgenus: Marmosa
- Species: M. tyleriana

Binomial name
- Marmosa tyleriana Tate, 1931
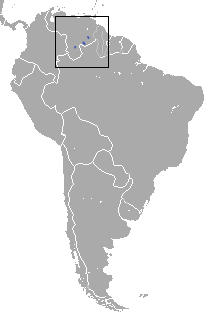
- Tyler's mouse opossum range

South American marsupial of the family Didelphidae

Tyler's mouse opossum (Marmosa tyleriana) is a South American marsupial of the family Didelphidae. It lives in rainforests of the Guiana Highlands of southern Venezuela at elevations between 1300 and 2200 m. The species has only been found on three isolated tepuis (Auyantepui, Marahuaca and Sarisariñama). All three of these locations are in protected areas (Canaima, Duida-Marahuaca and Jaua-Sarisariñama national parks).

The Latin species name refers to the habitat in which the opossum was first found, a Tyleria forest. In turn, both the genus Tyleria and the opossum's common name refer to Sidney F. Tyler, an American historian and photographer who helped finance the 1928-29 expedition of the American Museum of Natural History to the headwaters of the Orinoco, during which the opossum was discovered.
