= Reig's opossum =

Conservation status
- Vulnerable (IUCN 3.1)

Scientific classification
- Kingdom: Animalia
- Phylum: Chordata
- Class: Mammalia
- Infraclass: Marsupialia
- Order: Didelphimorphia
- Family: Didelphidae
- Genus: Monodelphis
- Species: M. reigi

Binomial name
- Monodelphis reigi Lew & Pérez-Hernández, 2004
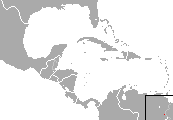
- Reig's opossum range

Species of marsupial

Reig's opossum (Monodelphis reigi) is a South American opossum species of the family Didelphidae, discovered in 2004. It is named after Argentine biologist Osvaldo Reig (1929–1992). It was initially found in montane forest in Canaima National Park, Venezuela at an elevation of 1300 m in the Sierra de Lema. It is typically found between 1100 m and 2050 m on Mount Ayanganna.
