= Pinheiro's slender opossum =

Conservation status
- Least Concern (IUCN 3.1)

Scientific classification
- Kingdom: Animalia
- Phylum: Chordata
- Class: Mammalia
- Infraclass: Marsupialia
- Order: Didelphimorphia
- Family: Didelphidae
- Genus: Marmosops
- Species: M. pinheiroi

Binomial name
- Marmosops pinheiroi Pine, 1981
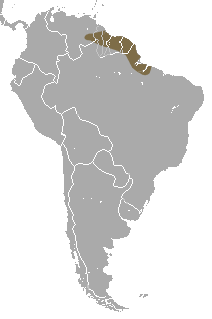
- Pinheiro's slender opossum range

Species of marsupial

Pinheiro's slender opossum (Marmosops pinheiroi) is an opossum species from South America. It is found in Brazil, French Guiana, Guyana, Suriname and Venezuela.
