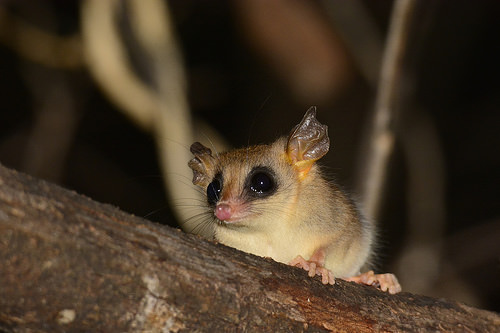
- Cryptonanus agricolai

Scientific classification
- Kingdom: Animalia
- Phylum: Chordata
- Class: Mammalia
- Infraclass: Marsupialia
- Order: Didelphimorphia
- Family: Didelphidae
- Subfamily: Didelphinae
- Tribe: Thylamyini
- Genus: Cryptonanus; Voss et al., 2005

Type species
- Marmosa agilis chacoensis Tate, 1931

Species
- Cryptonanus agricolai; Cryptonanus chacoensis; Cryptonanus guahybae; †Cryptonanus ignitus; Cryptonanus unduaviensis
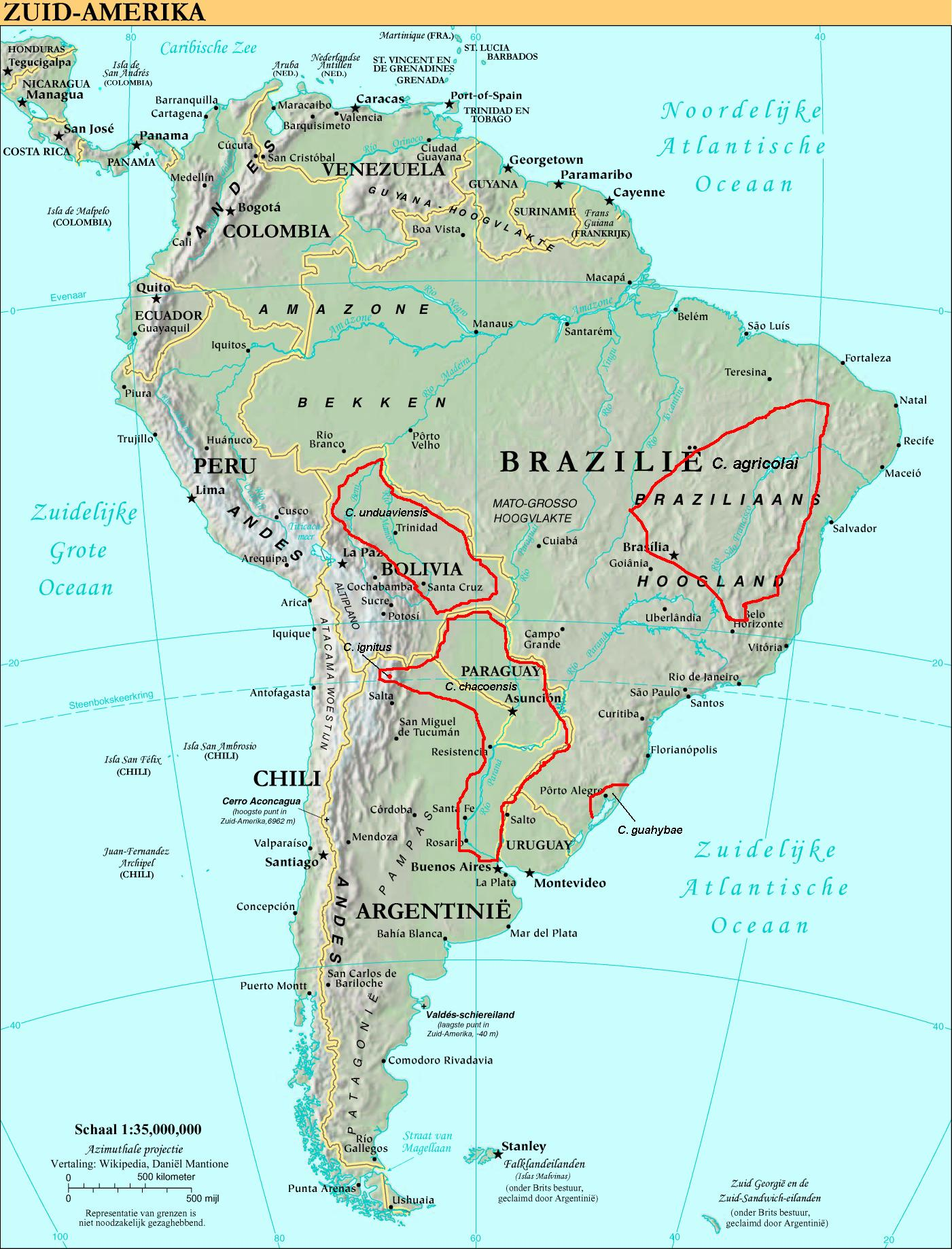

= Cryptonanus =

Genus of marsupials

Cryptonanus is a genus of opossums from South America. It includes five species found from Bolivia to Uruguay and eastern Brazil, one of which is now extinct. Although the first species were discovered in 1931, the genus was not recognized as distinct from Gracilinanus until 2005. It includes small opossums with generally grayish, sometimes reddish, fur that are mainly distinguished from other opossums by characters of the skull.

== Taxonomy ==
Species of Cryptonanus were first described in 1931 by George Henry Hamilton Tate, who described Marmosa microtarsus guahybae (now Cryptonanus guahybae) as a subspecies of Marmosa microtarsus (now Gracilinanus microtarsus), Marmosa agilis chacoensis (now Cryptonanus chacoensis) as a subspecies of Marmosa agilis (now Gracilinanus agilis), and Marmosa unduaviensis (now Cryptonanus unduaviensis) as a separate species. In 1943, another species was described, Marmosa agricolai (now Cryptonanus agricolai). Species of Cryptonanus were then included in a broadly defined genus Marmosa until the genus Gracilinanus was described in 1989. The fifth currently recognized Cryptonanus species, C. ignitus, was described as a species of Gracilinanus in 2002. At that time, the species of Cryptonanus were variously regarded as separate species or as synonyms or subspecies of other species of Gracilinanus.

Robert Voss and others noticed that some of the animals then classified in Gracilinanus had an additional foramen ovale, an opening in the skull that is formed by an extension of the bone of the alisphenoid tympanic wing towards the middle and front. They looked for other characters that correlated with the presence of the foramen and found them easy to find, defining a group of species distinct from Gracilinanus. A phylogenetic analysis corroborated the distinctness of Cryptonanus and Gracilinanus. Voss and colleagues first noted the discovery in a footnote in their 2004 paper on Chacodelphys and subsequently described the group of species with the additional foramen as a new genus, Cryptonanus. The generic name, Cryptonanus is derived from the Ancient Greek words κρυπτος kryptos (hidden) and νανος nanos (dwarf) and was chosen because Cryptonanus species are small and their true identity was long hidden by taxonomic synonymy. Cryptonanus is currently classified in the tribe Thylamyini of subfamily Didelphinae within the opossums.

Voss and colleagues recognized each of the five names they referred to Cryptonanus—agricolai, chacoensis, guahybae, ignitus, and unduaviensis—as separate species, although they could find few distinguishing characters between them. Further research in this matter is needed.

== Species ==
Cladogram of living Cryptonanus species.

- - C. guahybae
  - - C. unduaviensis
    - - C. agricolai
      - C. chacoensis

The five species currently recognized are:

Image	Scientific name	Distribution
	Cryptonanus agricolai	states of Ceará, Goiás, and Minas Gerais in eastern Brazil
	Cryptonanus chacoensis	southeastern Bolivia, Paraguay, northeastern Argentina, and Uruguay
	Cryptonanus guahybae	coastal Rio Grande do Sul, Brazil
	† Cryptonanus ignitus	single locality in Jujuy, northwestern Argentina extinct
	Cryptonanus unduaviensis	northern and eastern Bolivia

== Description ==
Cryptonanus species are small opossums even within their family and weigh about 15 to 40 grams (0.53 to 1.41 oz). The fur is unpatterned and usually reddish or grayish brown above and is grayish or unpigmented below. Guard hairs are poorly developed. A dark ring surrounds the eyes. On the forefeet, the third and fourth digits are longer than the second and fifth. Females lack a pouch and have 9 to 15 mammae. The tail looks naked to the unaided eye, but each scale in fact harbors three short hairs. Species of Cryptonanus and Gracilinanus are hardly distinguishable on external characters, though Cryptonanus species may have shorter tails, larger ears, broader eye-rings, and longer whiskers. More secure characters separate the skulls of the two genera. In addition to the presence of the additional foramen ovale, which exhibits some variation within species, Cryptonanus usually lacks maxillary fenestrae, perforations of the palate near the first and second molars, has the second upper premolar shorter than the third, lacks a rostral process, which extends the premaxillary bone further to the front, and usually has additional cusps on the upper canine tooth. The species of Cryptonanus differ in coloration, size, and some characters of the teeth.

The karyotype of C. agricolai includes 14 chromosomes with 24 major arms (2n = 14, FN = 24).

== Literature cited ==
- Diaz M. and Barquez, R. 2008. Cryptonanus ignitus. In IUCN. IUCN Red List of Threatened Species. Version 2009.2. <www.iucnredlist.org>. Downloaded on March 26, 2010.
- Gardner, A.L. 2009. Mammals of South America. Volume 1: Marsupials, xenarthrans, shrews, and bats. University of Chicago Press, 669 pp. ISBN 978-0-226-28240-4
- Tate, G.H.H. 1931. Brief diagnoses of twenty-six apparently new forms of Marmosa (Marsupialia) from South America. American Museum Novitates 493:1–14.
- Voss, R.S. and Jansa, S.A. 2009. Phylogenetic relationships and classification of didelphid marsupials, an extant radiation of New World metatherian mammals. Bulletin of the American Museum of Natural History 322:1–177.
- Voss, R.S., Lunde, D.P. and Jansa, S.A. 2005. On the contents of Gracilinanus Gardner & Creighton, 1989, with the description of a previously unrecognized clade of small didelphid marsupials. American Museum Novitates 3482:1–34.
- Voss, R.S., Gardner, A.L. and Jansa, S.A. 2004. On the relationships of "Marmosa" formosa Shamel, 1930 (Marsupialia, Didelphidae), a phylogenetic puzzle from the Chaco of northern Argentina. American Museum Novitates 3442:1–18.
