= Marmosa chachapoya =

Scientific classification
- Kingdom: Animalia
- Phylum: Chordata
- Class: Mammalia
- Infraclass: Marsupialia
- Order: Didelphimorphia
- Family: Didelphidae
- Genus: Marmosa
- Species: M. chachapoya

Binomial name
- Marmosa chachapoya Pavan, Abreu, Sánchez-Vendizú and Voss, 2025

Species of mammal

Marmosa chachapoya is a species of mouse opossums (Marmosa) that occurs in the northern Peruvian Andes.

== Characteristics ==
The holotype of Marmosa chachapoya, a young but fully grown male, has a head-body length of 10.7 centimeters, a 16 cm long tail, and weighs 21 grams. The hindfoot is 2 cm long, and the height of the ears is 1.8 cm. The snout is strikingly narrow. The dorsal fur is orange-brown and slightly lighter than the hairs on the top of the head. It has no dark stripe down the middle of the back, unlike some related species. The dark mask around the eyes does not extend to the base of the ears. On the ventral side, the fur is cream-colored. The upper side of the front and hind paws is densely covered with light yellow hairs. The scrotum is dark blue. The tail is covered with long hairs, and the skin underneath is uniformly brown and covered with scales, mostly arranged in spiral rows, less often in ring-shaped rows.

== Habitat ==
The Terra typica of Marmosa chachapoya is a montane forest located at an altitude of 2660 meters in the northeastern Peruvian Andes. The trees are about 20 to 30 meters high, and the shrub and herb layers are densely overgrown. Epiphytes grow on all levels of the forest, including lichens, mosses, ferns, orchids, and bromeliads. Other small mammals caught at the same location include the Utcubamba field mouse (Akodon orophilus), bamboo rats (Dactylomys sp.), pygmy rice rats (Microryzomys sp.), Keays's rice rat (Nephelomys keaysi), Ricardo Palma's rice rat (Nephelomys ricardopalmai), four species from the genus of Andean mice (Thomasomys), and one undescribed opossum species each from the genera Gracilinanus and Micoureus.

== Systematics ==
Marmosa chachapoya was first described in mid-2025 based on a single specimen caught in the Peruvian Department of San Martín and named after the Chachapoya, a prehistoric Andean people. Together with its sister species, the rufous mouse opossum (Marmosa lepida) and the heavy-browed mouse opossum (Marmosa andersoni), Marmosa chachapoya forms the subgenus Stegomarmosa within the genus of mouse opossums (Marmosa).

== See also ==
- List of living mammal species described in the 2020s
