= Unduavi gracile opossum =

Conservation status
- Data Deficient (IUCN 3.1)

Scientific classification
- Kingdom: Animalia
- Phylum: Chordata
- Class: Mammalia
- Infraclass: Marsupialia
- Order: Didelphimorphia
- Family: Didelphidae
- Genus: Cryptonanus
- Species: C. unduaviensis

Binomial name
- Cryptonanus unduaviensis (Tate, 1931)
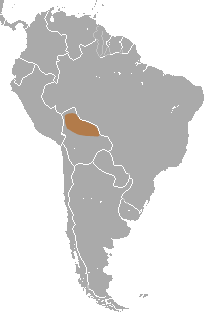
- Unduavi gracile opossum range

Species of marsupial

The Unduavi gracile opossum (Cryptonanus unduaviensis) is a species of opossum in the family Didelphidae. It is native to northern Bolivia, where it has been found in seasonally flooded grassland. Some of the specimens recognized by Voss et al. as belonging to this species were previously classified as the unduaviensis or buenavistae subspecies of Gracilinanus agilis.
