= Chacoan gracile opossum =

Conservation status
- Least Concern (IUCN 3.1)

Scientific classification
- Kingdom: Animalia
- Phylum: Chordata
- Class: Mammalia
- Infraclass: Marsupialia
- Order: Didelphimorphia
- Family: Didelphidae
- Genus: Cryptonanus
- Species: C. chacoensis

Binomial name
- Cryptonanus chacoensis (Tate, 1931)
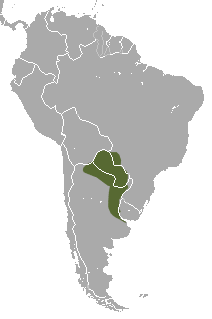
- Chacoan gracile opossum range

Species of marsupial

The chacoan gracile opossum (Cryptonanus chacoensis) is a species of opossum in the family Didelphidae. It is native to Argentina, Brazil and Paraguay. Its habitat is seasonally flooded grasslands and forests in and near the Gran Chaco.

The red-bellied gracile opossum (Cryptonanus ignitus), previously thought to have been extinct since 1962, has since been reevaluated as synonymous with the chacoan gracile opossum, as several specimens of C. chacoensis have been discovered that display similar coloration to C. ignitus.
