= Aceramarca gracile opossum =

Conservation status
- Least Concern (IUCN 3.1)

Scientific classification
- Kingdom: Animalia
- Phylum: Chordata
- Class: Mammalia
- Infraclass: Marsupialia
- Order: Didelphimorphia
- Family: Didelphidae
- Genus: Gracilinanus
- Species: G. aceramarcae

Binomial name
- Gracilinanus aceramarcae (Tate, 1931)
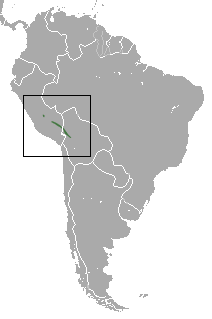
- Aceramarca gracile opossum range

Species of opossum

The Aceramarca gracile opossum or Bolivian gracile opossum (Gracilinanus aceramarcae) is a species of opossum. It is native to Bolivia and Peru, where it occurs in tropical elfin forest habitat.

This opossum is mostly arboreal, but it may forage on the ground for food.

This species has been recorded at only six locations, but it is not considered to be threatened because its habitat is relatively secure from deforestation and other threats at this time.

This mouse opossum does not have a pouch. It is reddish or grayish brown in color with a cream-colored belly and a dark eye ring. It is up to 13.5 centimetres (5 1/3 in) long, not including its slender, scaly tail, which may be over 15 centimetres (6 in) long.
