= C17orf107 =

Human gene and protein

Identifiers
- Aliases: C17orf107, chromosome 17 open reading frame 107
- External IDs: MGI: 2148639; HomoloGene: 109413; GeneCards: C17orf107; OMA:C17orf107 - orthologs

Gene location (Human)
Chr.	Chromosome 17 (human)
Band	17p13.2	Start	4,899,418 bp
Band	17p13.2	End	4,902,934 bp

Gene location (Mouse)
Chr.	Chromosome 11 (mouse)
Band	11|11 B3	Start	70,506,674 bp
Band	11|11 B3	End	70,507,716 bp
RNA expression pattern
Bgee	Human / Mouse (ortholog); Top expressed in: anterior pituitary; right auricle of heart; bone marrow cell; thymus; prefrontal cortex; right lobe of liver; primary visual cortex; stromal cell of endometrium; olfactory zone of nasal mucosa; salivary gland / Top expressed in: testicle; spermatid; skeletal muscle tissue; quadriceps femoris muscle; spermatocyte; muscle of thigh; embryo; embryo; lip; esophagus; More reference expression data
BioGPS	n/a
Orthologs
Species	Human	Mouse
Entrez	100130311	668433
Ensembl	ENSG00000205710	ENSMUSG00000087279
UniProt	Q6ZR85	n/a
RefSeq (mRNA)	NM_001145536	NM_001145537
RefSeq (protein)	NP_001139008	n/a
Location (UCSC)	Chr 17: 4.9 – 4.9 Mb	Chr 11: 70.51 – 70.51 Mb
PubMed search
- Wikidata
View/Edit Human	View/Edit Mouse

Chromosome 17 Open Reading Frame 107 is a protein encoded by the C17orf107 gene in Homo sapiens. C17orf107 in located intracellularly with a secondary structure of five alpha helixes.

== Gene ==
=== Location ===
Human C17orf107 is located on the short arm of chromosome 17 at p 13.2. With introns, the gene spans nucleotides 4,899,536 to 4,906,715. The spliced gene is 3,201 nucleotides with three exons on the plus strand.

=== Gene Level Regulation ===
Human C17orf107 is expressed ubiquitously in tissues with the heart and brain tissues having a higher expression and the endocrine and salivary gland tissues having the highest expression.

== Protein ==
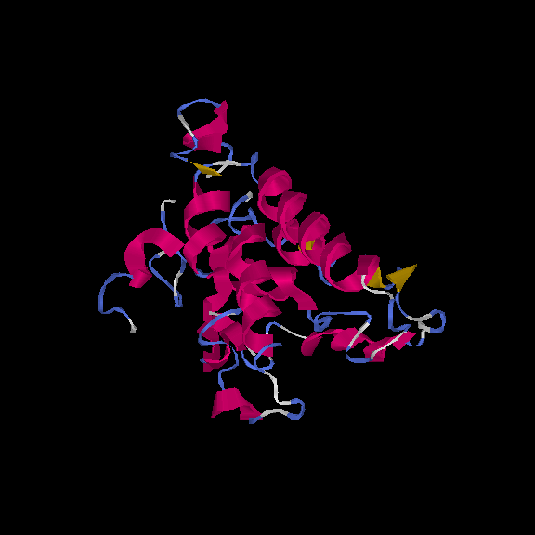
iTasser Secondary Structure of human C17orf107 protein with 5 alpha helixes in magenta and coils in blue.

Human C17orf107 protein, encoded by the mRNA sequence, is 190 amino acids in length. The molecular mass of the protein is approximately 20 kDa with a basal isoelectric point of 7 pH. C17orf107 is a part of the DUFF5536 conserved protein domain which is part of the pfam17688, a member of the superfamily cl39220.

=== Protein Level Regulation ===
Human C17orf107 protein is localized intracellularly with no transmembrane domains. There is evidence of being expressed in the nucleoplasm. The protein has no asparagines, therefore there are no N-glycosylation sites. C17orf107 protein does not have post-translational modifications, disulfide bonds, or signal peptides.

== Evolution ==
=== Orthologs ===
Human C17orf107 is found in all mammals except Monotremes, Hyracoidea, Tubulidentata, Cingulata, Peramelemorphia, Paucituberculata, Sirenia, and Notoryctemorphia groups. The C17orf107 gene first appeared in mammals with the earliest found species dating back to 160 million years ago in marsupials. The table below shows protein orthologs to Human C17orf107, sorted by estimated date of divergence, then by taxonomic group, and lastly sequence identity scores.

Orthologs
Taxonomic group	Common name	Genus and species	Accession number	Date of Divergence (MYA)	Sequence length (aa)	Sequence identity (%) ! !Sequence similarity (%)	Sequence Gaps (%)	
Primates	Human	Homo sapiens	NP_001139008.1	—	190	—	—	—
	Western Lowland Gorilla	Gorilla gorilla gorilla	XP_018868465.1	9	189	82	83	15
Lagomorpha	European Rabbit	Oryctolagus cuniculus	XP_008269053.1	87	204	64	72	13
Rodentia	House Mouse	Mus musculus	EDL12584.1	87	128	33	37	55
Artiodactyla	East African Hippopotamus	Hippopotamus amphibius kiboko	XP_057569928.1	94	183	78	84	4
	Sheep	Ovis aries	KAG5203555.1	94	233	51	55	34
	Wild Bactrian Camel	Camelus ferus	EPY72335.1	94	183	43	50	32
Carnivora	Sea Otter	Enhydra lutris kenyoni	XP_022380488.1	94	216	63	69	19
	Giant Panda	Ailuropoda melanoleuca	XP_034502549.1	94	247	58	63	25
	Clouded Leopard	Neofelis nebulosa	XP_058561310.1	94	90	40	44	53
Cetacea	Harbor Porpoise	Phocoena phocoena	XP_065753064.1	94	179	70	79	11
	Narwhal	Monodon monoceros	TKC42450.1	94	263	26	30	51
Chiroptera	Nathusius Pipistrelle Bat	Pipistrellus nathusii	CAK6437783.1	94	135	39	45	42
Perissodactyla	Horse	Equus caballus	XP_005597777.1	94	212	69	75	16
	Southern White Rhinoceros	Diceros bicornis minor	XP_058415933.1	94	218	67	75	13
Pholidota	Sunda Pangolin	Manis javanica	XP_017503787.1	94	197	65	73	8
Proboscidea	Indian Elephant	Elephas maximus indicus	XP_049717565.1	99	248	56	62	26
Marsupial	Agile Gracile Opossum	Gracilinanus agilis	XP_044529018.1	160	179	50	52	22
	Tasmanian Devil	Sarcophilus harrisii	XP_012404229.1	160	189	48	59	22
	Monito Del Monte	Dromiciops gliroides	XP_043856787.1	160	198	41	52	20
