= Red mouse opossum =

Conservation status
- Data Deficient (IUCN 3.1)

Scientific classification
- Kingdom: Animalia
- Phylum: Chordata
- Class: Mammalia
- Infraclass: Marsupialia
- Order: Didelphimorphia
- Family: Didelphidae
- Genus: Marmosa
- Subgenus: Eomarmosa; Voss et al., 2014
- Species: M. rubra

Binomial name
- Marmosa rubra Tate, 1931
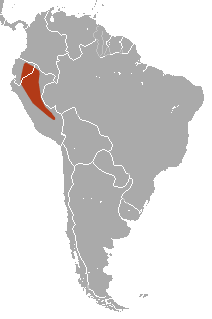
- Red mouse opossum range

Species of marsupial

The red mouse opossum (Marmosa rubra) is a South American marsupial of the family Didelphidae. Its range includes eastern Ecuador and Peru.
