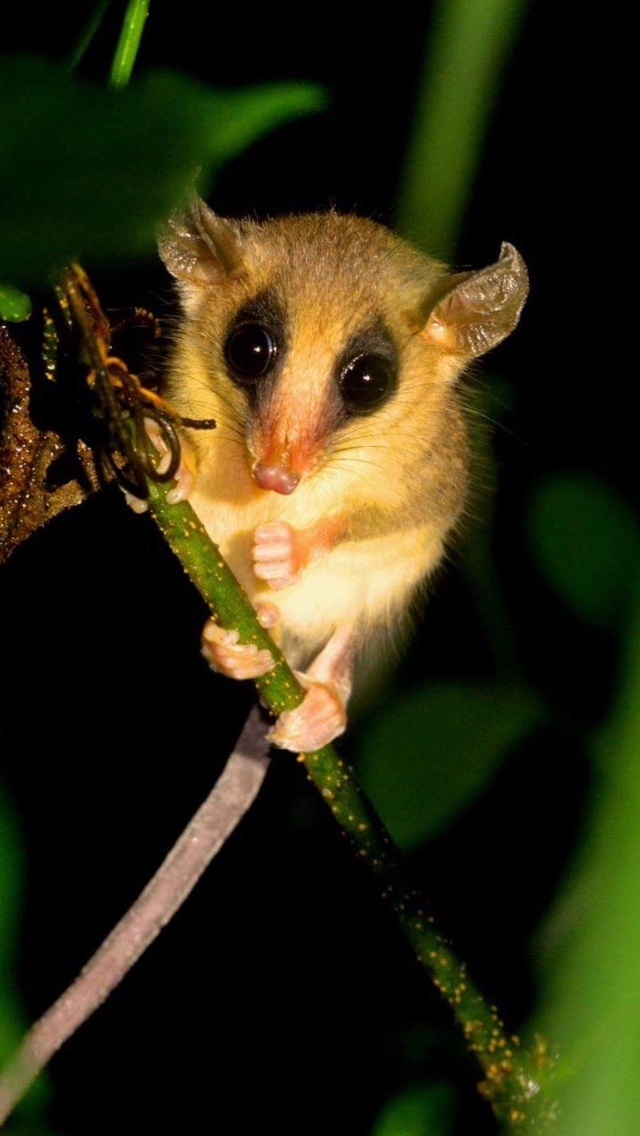

Conservation status
- Least Concern (IUCN 3.1)

Scientific classification
- Kingdom: Animalia
- Phylum: Chordata
- Class: Mammalia
- Infraclass: Marsupialia
- Order: Didelphimorphia
- Family: Didelphidae
- Genus: Marmosa
- Subgenus: Exulomarmosa
- Species: M. mexicana

Binomial name
- Marmosa mexicana Merriam, 1897
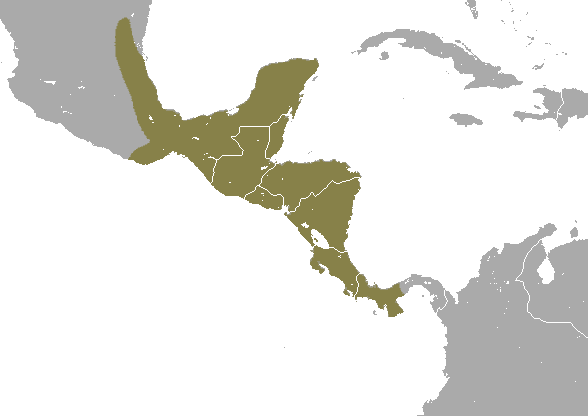
- Mexican mouse opossum range

= Mexican mouse opossum =

Species of marsupial

The Mexican mouse opossum (Marmosa mexicana) is a species of North American opossum in the family Didelphidae.

== Description ==
Marmosa mexicana is a small to moderate-sized reddish-brown marsupial, varying from bright to dull coloration. Hairs of the back, sides and outer surfaces of legs are lead-colored at the base and tipped with reddish brown. The forehead and nose are paler in color. The eye-rings are black and vary in intensity based on the region of the individual. The cheeks, throat, belly and inner surfaces of legs are yellowish with a median white pectoral area. Body hair continues onto the tail for approximately 10 mm. Its nose is pink, ears are grayish brown, and its tail is a dusky brown. It possesses a prehensile tail of equal length to its body. While appearing naked, the tail in fact has a fine layer of hair.

== Reproduction ==
Like all marsupials, gestation is probably short, with females' giving birth to poorly developed young and most of the development taking place during lactation. It is likely that reproduction is similar to that of Marmosa robinsoni, which gives birth to 6–14 young after a gestation period of just 14 days. The tiny young, measuring only up to 12 millimeters, attach themselves to the mother's mammae where they may remain for around 30 days.

Unlike many marsupials, female mouse opossums do not possess a pouch to protect the young as they develop. The young are born so undeveloped that they don't open their eyes until 39–40 days after birth. It is likely that the young are completely weaned after around 65 days, and they may have an incredibly short life span of only one year. Marmosa species build nests for shelter, or use abandoned bird nests, holes in trees or banana stalks. These nest sites are unlikely to be permanent; rather, the opossum will use whatever site is most convenient when the sun begins to rise.

== Range ==
It is found in Belize, Costa Rica, El Salvador, Guatemala, Honduras, eastern Mexico as far north as Tamaulipas, Nicaragua, and western Panama at elevations from sea level up to 3000 m (at Volcán Tacaná); most commonly, it is found below 1800 m.

== Habitat ==
This opossum is found in primary and secondary forest, including lowland tropical rainforest, dry deciduous forest, cloud forest, and plantations, as well as in grassland. An example of its habitat is the Petenes mangroves ecoregion of the Yucatán.

== Habits ==
The species is primarily arboreal; it is found from ground level to heights of 30 m in the canopy. It is nocturnal and solitary. Its diet includes insects and fruit. It is believed to construct nests either in burrows or above ground. The forepaws of M. mexicana have remarkable manipulative powers. It uses this ability to burrow in the ground. The burrow can be 30 mm in diameter and 40 cm in length. The mouse-opossum then fills the burrow with leaves to create a nest. More commonly it creates nests in trees, especially in abandoned bird nests. When threatened by predators such as American barn owls, mottled owls and Central American rattlesnakes, it can become aggressive, opening its mouth and hissing or making a clicking noise.

== Conservation ==
There are no current threats to this species however with the current deforestation and expansion of resource harvesting, the habitat could be threatened in the future.
