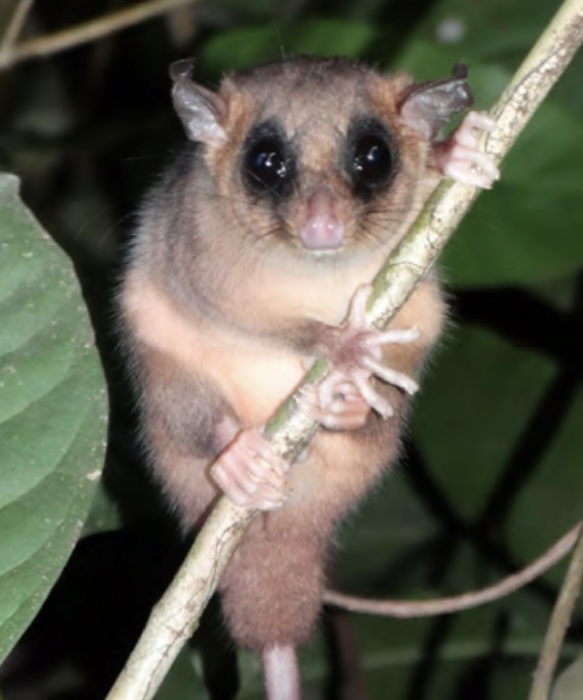
- Isthmian mouse opossum holding onto a branch

Scientific classification
- Kingdom: Animalia
- Phylum: Chordata
- Class: Mammalia
- Infraclass: Marsupialia
- Order: Didelphimorphia
- Family: Didelphidae
- Genus: Marmosa
- Subgenus: Exulomarmosa
- Species: M. isthmica

Binomial name
- Marmosa isthmica Goldman, 1912

= Isthmian mouse opossum =

Species of marsupial

The Isthmian mouse opossum (Marmosa isthmica) is a species of opossum in the family Didelphidae found in Colombia, Ecuador, and Panama.

Foraging along branches and vines for fruit and insects, with the help of a prehensile tail, M. isthmica was formerly considered a subspecies of Robinson's mouse opossum (Marmosa robinsoni) and is supposed to be similar to it in habit, but following Rossi (2005) it is now deemed a species.

In 1935 in the Panama Canal Zone, Enders observed Marmosa isthmica to build nests with leaves in a nestbox fixed to a tree.
