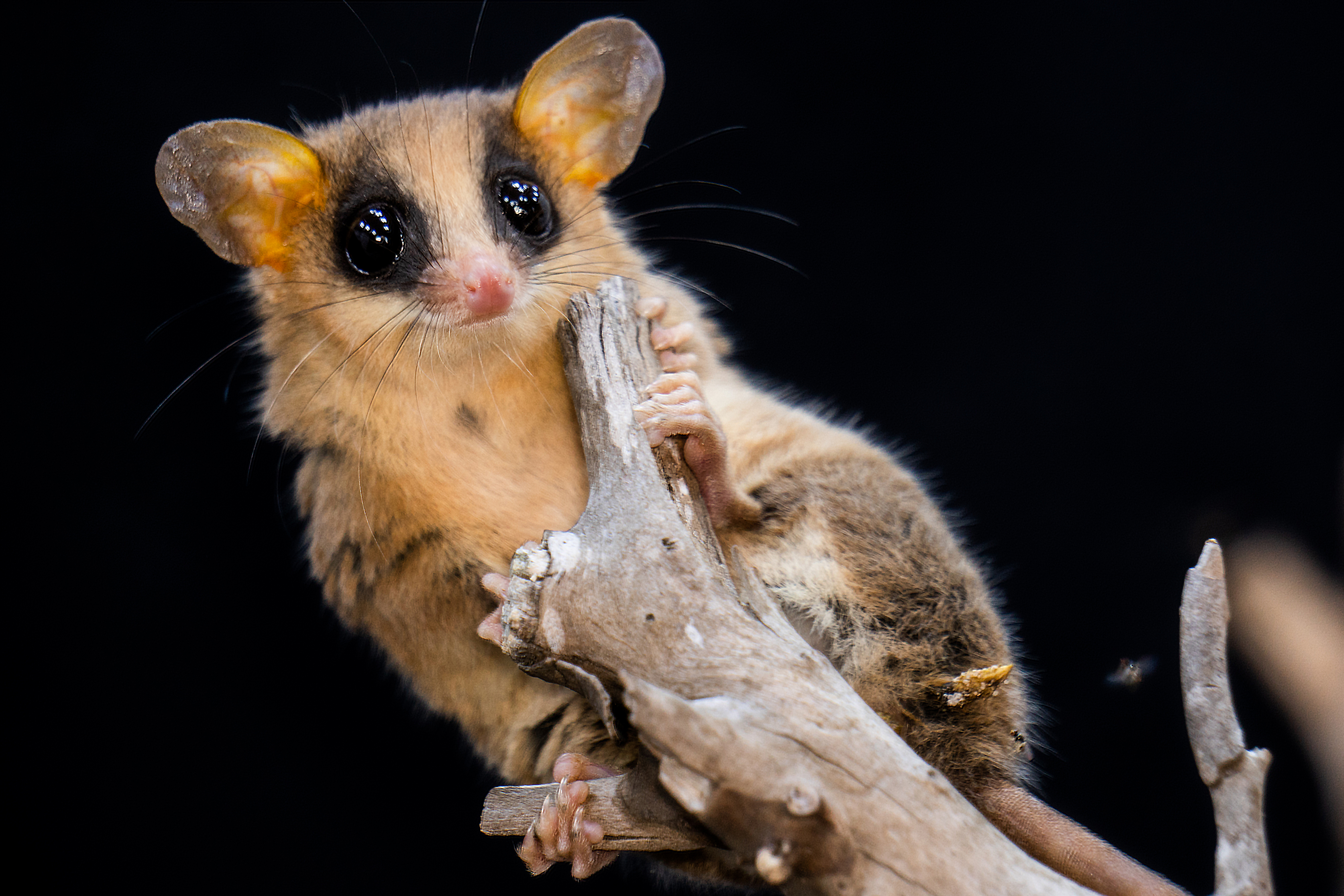
- G. agilis in São Paulo state, Brazil

Scientific classification
- Kingdom: Animalia
- Phylum: Chordata
- Class: Mammalia
- Infraclass: Marsupialia
- Order: Didelphimorphia
- Family: Didelphidae
- Subfamily: Didelphinae
- Tribe: Thylamyini
- Genus: Gracilinanus; Gardner & Creighton, 1989

Type species
- Didelphys microtarsus Wagner, 1842

Species
- See text
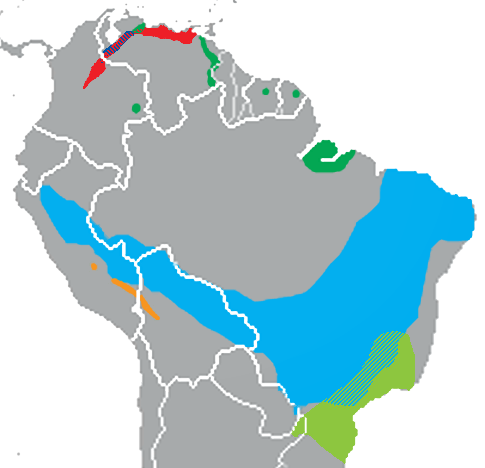
- Species ranges: G. aceramarcae (Tate, 1931); G. agilis (Burmeister, 1854); G. dryas (Thomas, 1898); G. emiliae (Thomas, 1909); G. marica (Thomas, 1898); G. microtarsus (Wagner, 1842)

= Gracilinanus =

Genus of marsupials

Gracilinanus is a genus of opossum in the family Didelphidae. It was separated from the genus Marmosa in 1989, and has since had the genera Cryptonanus, Chacodelphys, and Hyladelphys removed from it.

== Physical description ==
Gracile mouse opossums, excluding the fat-tailed mouse opossum, in general, have a prehensile tail that is thin and very long. The tails of mouse opossums are naked. Mouse opossums have ears that are, both, large and naked. General opossums, including Gracilinanus species, have noses that are pointed. Another general characteristic that mouse opossum have are mammary glands. Each member of the Gracilinanus species has a dark ring that is found around each eye. The species G. microtarsus has red-brown fur on the top of the body and gray fur on the underside. In comparison with G. microtarsus, G. agilis has paler fur color. Over the years, a new species, G. ignitus, has been added to the genus. G. ignitus has a white patch on its chest. It, as well, has a light, two-tone colored tail that has only a few hairs. The fur color can be used to determine if a member of the genus is part of the G. ignitus species. G. microtarsus, G. emiliae, and G. dryas can be distinguished from G. ignitus by their tails that are only one color. One difference between G. agilis and G. ignitus is that G. agilis has a hairier tail. G. aceramarcae has naked skin compared to G. ignitus. G. emiliae is smaller than G. ignitus. G. emiliae, in general, has a very long tail. A difference between G. emiliae and the rest of the species in the genus is that it has white fur on the underside of the body and the rest of the species have a gray or brown color.

== Taxonomy ==
It contains the following species:

- Aceramarca gracile opossum (Gracilinanus aceramarcae)
- Agile gracile opossum (Gracilinanus agilis)
- Wood sprite gracile opossum (Gracilinanus dryas)
- Emilia's gracile opossum (Gracilinanus emilae)
- Northern gracile opossum (Gracilinanus marica)
- Brazilian gracile opossum (Gracilinanus microtarsus)
- Peruvian opossum (Gracilinanus peruanus)

Cladogram of living Gracilinanus species:

- - G. emilae (Emilia's gracile opossum)
  - - G. aceramarcae (Aceramarca gracile opossum)
    - - G. peruanus
      - - G. microtarsus (Brazilian gracile opossum)
        - G. agilis (Agile gracile opossum)

== Habitat ==
Gracilinanus species can be found in a number of different places. The different regions that Gracilinanus species can be found are Peru, Bolivia, Brazil, Paraguay, and Venezuela. Some species are found in forests, trees, fallen trunks, tree holes, humid environments, and coffee plantations. G. emiliae is distributed along the Amazonia and the coast of Venezuelan rainforests. G. emiliae is one of the two species in the genus that is found in lowland Amazonian rainforests. G. agilis and G. microtarsus are the only two species that have been found in the central, south, and southeastern parts of Brazil. The other species have been found in the Amazon and not in Brazil. The production of sugar cane and fruits, along with deforestation, is thought to be a reason why the newer species, G. ignitus, has been harder to find.

== Endangerment ==
Out of the species that currently exist, only two are on the endangered list. Gracilinanus agilis is not considered to be threatened, in general, but in the specific area of Paraguay, the species is close to being threatened. The only other species that is near threatened is G. dryas. A major threat to these species is that their main habitat is being destroyed by deforestation. However, it has also been reported that these species are on the critically endangered list because they are only known in two general areas where their habitat has been found to be taking a decline. The species of the genus Gracilinanus once occupied other regions in South America but are now extinct there.

== Diet ==
The species G. microtarsus has a diet that includes insects, spiders, fruits, termites, beetles and ants. As well, this species has been known to live off of wasps and small invertebrates. However, the main component of G. microtarsus' diet is ants. It is reported that males eat more food than females.

== Reproduction ==
Like most marsupials, the female has two vaginas and the males have a two-pronged penis. Some females can have a litter size of up to 15, but usually have a litter of about 7. Females of the species do not have a pouch that the young are able to stay in. For those that do not have a pouch, the young are only attached to the nipples for a short time period and are left in their nests early on in their life.

== Interesting facts ==
Some species are nocturnal. A few Gracilinanus species know how to play dead. The newest species that was found, G. ignitus, is reported to be one of the largest of all the species. G. emiliae is one of the species that has only a dozen specimens found. The species in this genus are known to climb a lot and dig holes in trees or the ground.
