= Red-bellied gracile opossum =

Conservation status
- Extinct (1962) (IUCN 3.1)

Scientific classification
- Kingdom: Animalia
- Phylum: Chordata
- Class: Mammalia
- Infraclass: Marsupialia
- Order: Didelphimorphia
- Family: Didelphidae
- Genus: Cryptonanus
- Species: †C. ignitus

Binomial name
- †Cryptonanus ignitus (Díaz, Flores & Barquez, 2002)

Extinct species of marsupial

The red-bellied gracile opossum (Cryptonanus ignitus) is an extinct species of opossum that was native to Jujuy Province in northwest Argentina. Its forest habitat has been destroyed, and it was last seen in 1962. It is likely a synonym of the Chacoan gracile opossum.
