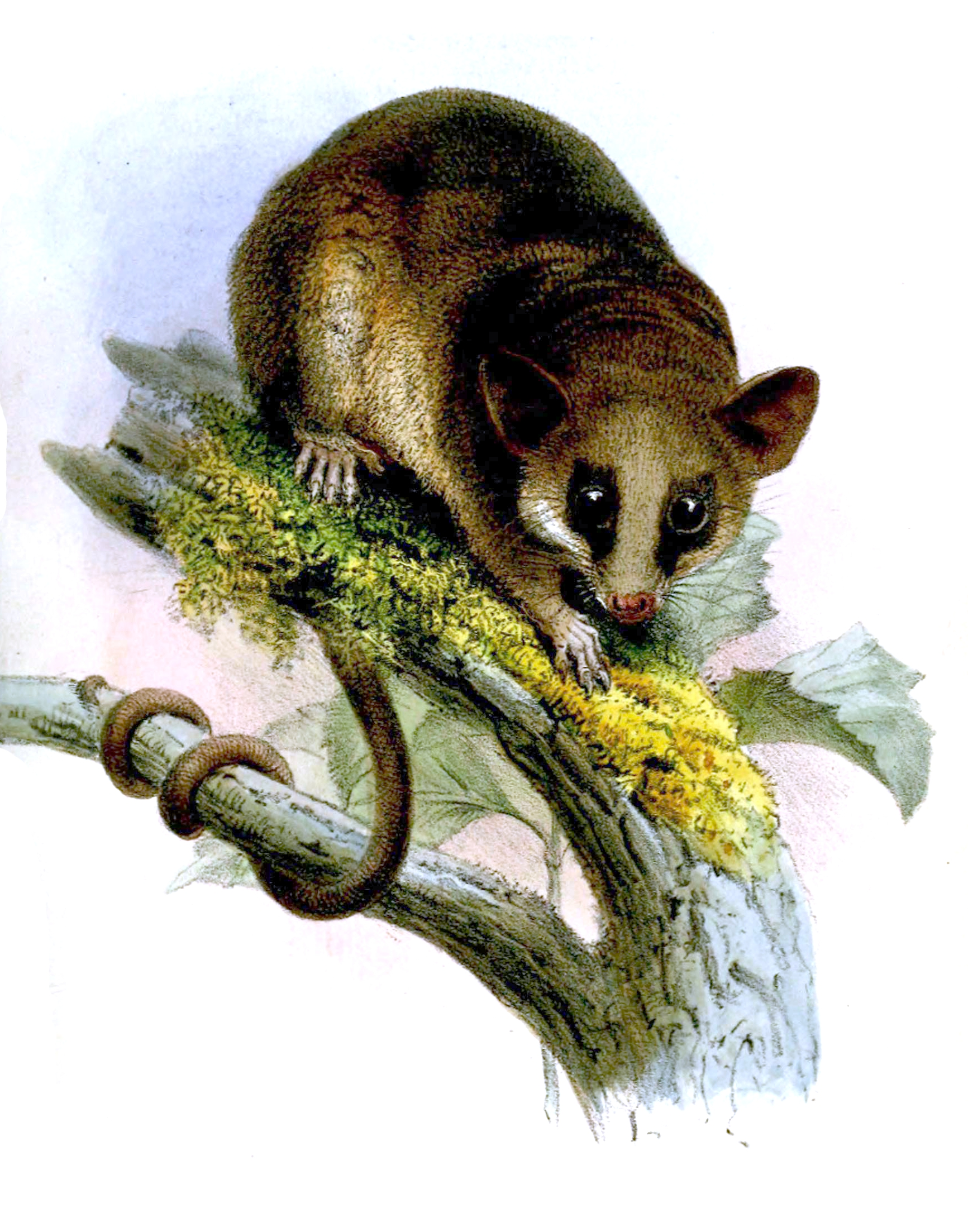
- 1859 illustration

Scientific classification
- Kingdom: Animalia
- Phylum: Chordata
- Class: Mammalia
- Infraclass: Marsupialia
- Order: Didelphimorphia
- Family: Didelphidae
- Genus: Marmosa
- Species: M. waterhousei

Binomial name
- Marmosa waterhousei Tomes, 1860

Synonyms
- Didelphys waterhousii Tomes, 1860; Marmosa bombascarae Anthony, 1922; Marmosa maranii Thomas, 1924; Marmosa murina waterhousei Tomes, 1860; Caluromys waterhousei

= Marmosa waterhousei =

Species of opossum

Marmosa waterhousei, the waterhouse's mouse opossum, is a species of opossum in the family Didelphidae. Found in the Andean regions of Ecuador, Peru, Colombia, and Venezuela, this opossum's body and tail are various shades of brown.

== Description ==
Marmosa waterhousei's tail measures 17.2–22.3 cm (6.8–8.8 in) in length, and its body and head are roughly 12.2–14.9 cm (4.8–5.9 in) in length combined; this makes its tail roughly 1.4 times longer than its head and body. Its back is primarily gray-brown with a variable dark brown-orange tint, and its sides are more pale in color. M. waterhousei has forefeet of brown to orange-brown, and hindfeet of white to orange-brown.

The tail of M. waterhousei has a hairless portion (covering 90% of it) that is brown to dark brown in color, but a bit lighter in hue on the sides. The sides of the waterhouse's mouse opossum's head are white to yellow-white, and the same hue extends down to the chest; partially gray hairs are found on the neck, chest, and abdomen, as well as other regions such as the sides of limbs. Females of this species are without a pouch, and the quantity of mammae, as well as the description of the karyotype, are unknown in the species.

== Type specimen ==
The waterhouse's mouse opossum was first described in 1860 from a group of syntypes, but no single type specimen was designated. A type specimen (lectotype) from Gualaquiza, Ecuador was chosen in 1921; all that remains of the specimen is a skull as the rest of the liquid-preserved body was lost.

== Distribution and habitat ==
Marmosa waterhousei is found around foothills near the Andes as well as nearby lowland areas. Specifically, it is found in the regions of eastern Ecuador, southeastern Colombia, northeastern Peru, and sporadically around northern Colombia and western Venezuela. It prefers moist lowland or mountainous tropical forest at altitudes of about 50-1100 meters.
