= Northern gracile opossum =

Conservation status
- Least Concern (IUCN 3.1)

Scientific classification
- Kingdom: Animalia
- Phylum: Chordata
- Class: Mammalia
- Infraclass: Marsupialia
- Order: Didelphimorphia
- Family: Didelphidae
- Genus: Gracilinanus
- Species: G. marica

Binomial name
- Gracilinanus marica (Thomas, 1898)
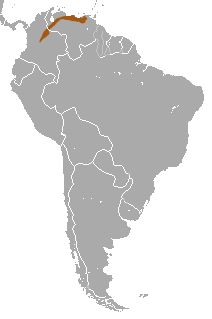
- Northern gracile opossum range

Synonyms
- Gracilinanus perijae Hershkovitz, 1992

Species of marsupial

The northern gracile opossum (Gracilinanus marica) is a species of opossum in the family Didelphidae. It is found in Colombia and Venezuela. G. marica naturally occurs in subtropical or tropical moist lowland forests.
