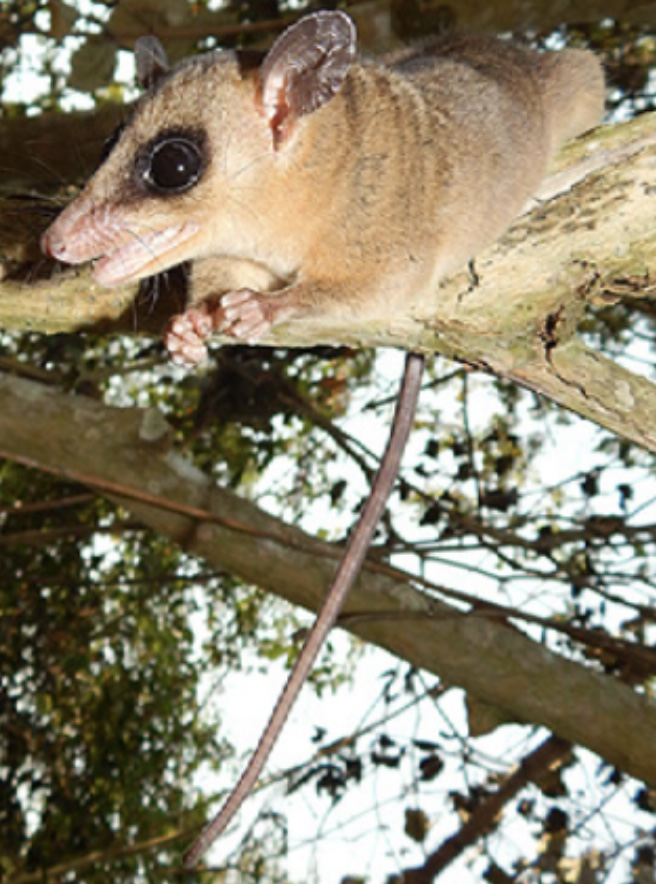

Conservation status
- Least Concern (IUCN 3.1)

Scientific classification
- Kingdom: Animalia
- Phylum: Chordata
- Class: Mammalia
- Infraclass: Marsupialia
- Order: Didelphimorphia
- Family: Didelphidae
- Genus: Marmosa
- Subgenus: Micoureus
- Species: M. constantiae

Binomial name
- Marmosa constantiae (Thomas, 1904)
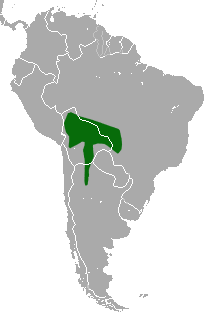
- White-bellied woolly mouse opossum range

Synonyms
- Micoureus constantiae (Thomas, 1904)

= White-bellied woolly mouse opossum =

Species of marsupial

The white-bellied woolly mouse opossum (Marmosa constantiae) is a small pouchless marsupial of the family Didelphidae. It was formerly assigned to the genus Micoureus, which was made a subgenus of Marmosa in 2009. The specific epithet was given in honour of Constance Sladen (née Anderson), wife of the naturalist Percy Sladen. She funded the 1902 expedition which collected the type specimen.

== Description ==
This is one of the larger mouse opossums, with a head=body length of 11 to 18 cm (4.3 to 7.1 in), a tail 15 to 23 cm (5.9 to 9.1 in) in length, and weighing from 35 to 144 g (1.2 to 5.1 oz). The fur is thick and woolly, and is grey over most of the body, fading to buffy-yellow on the head and underparts. There are clear, but narrow, rings of black fur around the eyes. The tail is furred only at the base, and is near black for most of its length, but changes suddenly to pale pink along the last third or so.

The feet are broad, with stout claws and ridges on the underside of the toes that aid in climbing trees. Females do not have a pouch, but have fifteen teats arranged in a circle - more than in any of this species' closest relatives.

== Distribution and habitat ==
The opossum is found across northern Bolivia, in the Brazilian states of Mato Grosso and Mato Grosso do Sul, and in northern Argentina as far south as Tucumán Province. It has also recently been reported from Paraguay. Across this region, it inhabits moist tropical forests, often near the boundary with drier habitats, and has been found from near sea level to montane forests as high as 1,000 m (3,300 ft) elevation.

== Biology and behaviour ==
The opossum is arboreal, solitary, and nocturnal, spending most of its time in the forest understory. It is omnivorous, feeding on insects (especially bugs) and vegetable matter. Little is known of their reproductive biology, but they appear to breed throughout the year, and mothers have been captured with up to seven young attached to their teats.
