= Bare-tailed woolly mouse opossum =

Conservation status
- Least Concern (IUCN 3.1)

Scientific classification
- Kingdom: Animalia
- Phylum: Chordata
- Class: Mammalia
- Infraclass: Marsupialia
- Order: Didelphimorphia
- Family: Didelphidae
- Genus: Marmosa
- Subgenus: Micoureus
- Species: M. rutteri

Binomial name
- Marmosa rutteri Thomas, 1924
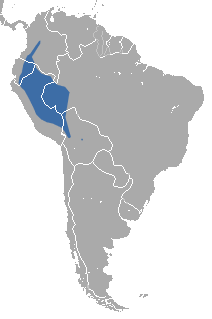
- Bare-tailed woolly mouse opossum range

Synonyms
- Micoureus regina (Thomas, 1898)

Species of marsupial

The bare-tailed woolly mouse opossum (Marmosa rutteri) or short-furred woolly mouse opossum is a South American marsupial of the family Didelphidae. Its range includes Brazil, Colombia, Ecuador, Peru, and Bolivia. It is found in tropical rainforest in the westernmost portion of the Amazon Basin and the eastern foothills of the Andes, at elevations up to 1634 m. It was formerly assigned to the genus Micoureus, which was made a subgenus of Marmosa in 2009.
