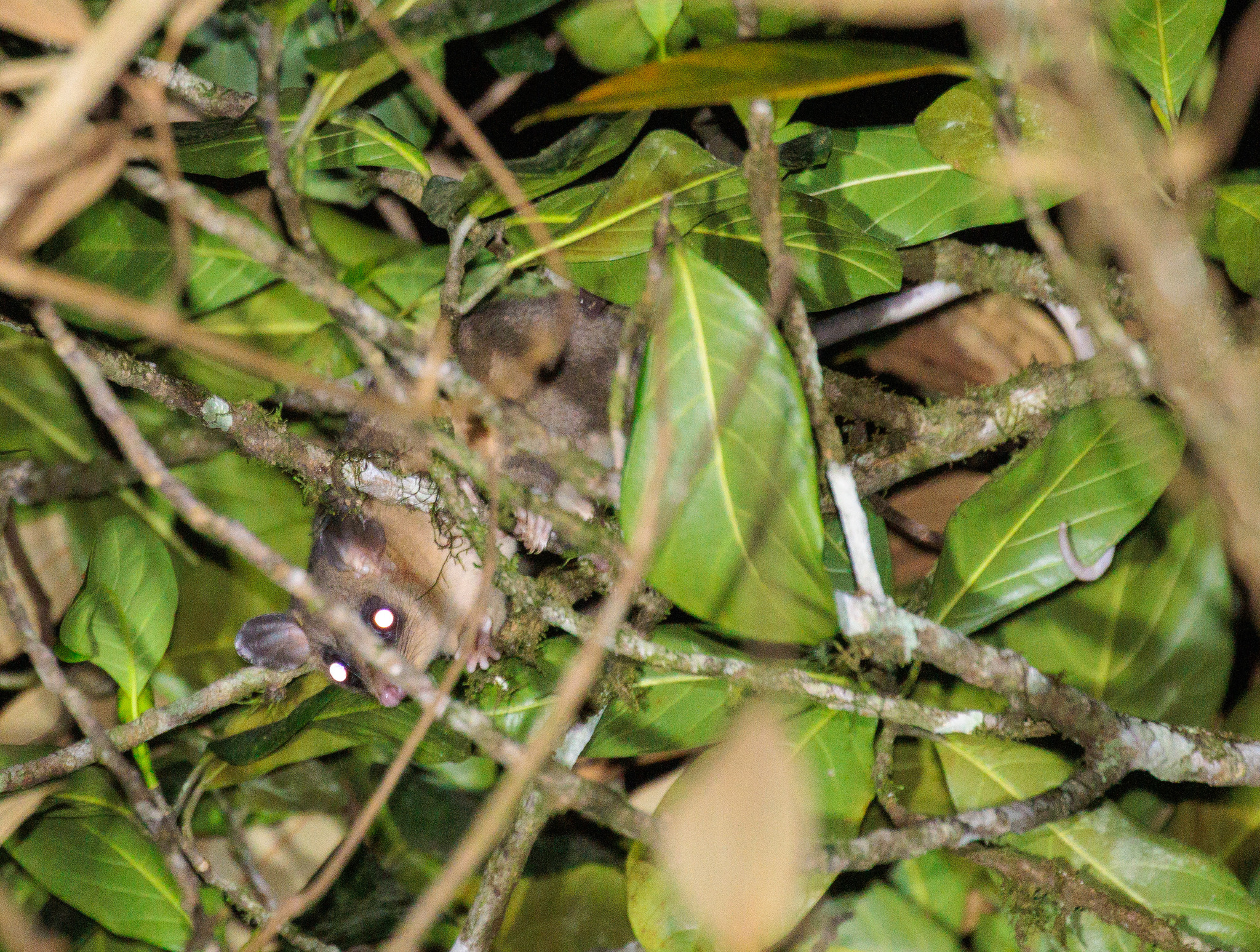

Conservation status
- Least Concern (IUCN 3.1)

Scientific classification
- Kingdom: Animalia
- Phylum: Chordata
- Class: Mammalia
- Infraclass: Marsupialia
- Order: Didelphimorphia
- Family: Didelphidae
- Genus: Marmosa
- Subgenus: Micoureus
- Species: M. demerarae

Binomial name
- Marmosa demerarae Thomas, 1905
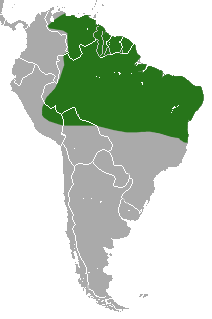
- Long-furred woolly mouse opossum range

Synonyms
- Micoureus demerarae (Thomas, 1905); Micoureus cinereus (Temminck, 1824)

= Woolly mouse opossum =

Long-furred woolly mouse opossum

Species of marsupial

The woolly mouse opossum or long-furred woolly mouse opossum (Marmosa demerarae), known locally as the cuíca, is a South American marsupial of the family Didelphidae. Its range includes central Colombia, Venezuela, French Guiana, Guyana, Suriname, eastern Peru, northern Bolivia, and northern Brazil. It was formerly assigned to the genus Micoureus, which was made a subgenus of Marmosa in 2009.

It generally lives in tropical, humid forest below 1,200 meter elevation as in the Andes and surrounding lowlands. It is often found on plantations or other disturbed areas as well as evergreen forests.
