= Emilia's gracile opossum =

Conservation status
- Data Deficient (IUCN 3.1)

Scientific classification
- Kingdom: Animalia
- Phylum: Chordata
- Class: Mammalia
- Infraclass: Marsupialia
- Order: Didelphimorphia
- Family: Didelphidae
- Genus: Gracilinanus
- Species: G. emiliae

Binomial name
- Gracilinanus emiliae (Thomas, 1909)
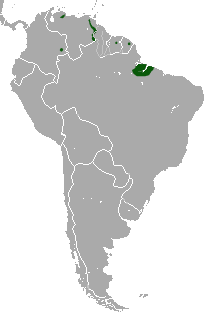
- Emilia's gracile opossum range

Synonyms
- Gracilinanus longicaudus Hershkovitz, 1992

Species of marsupial

Emilia's gracile opossum (Gracilinanus emiliae) is an opossum species from South America. It is found in Brazil, Colombia, French Guiana, and Suriname.
