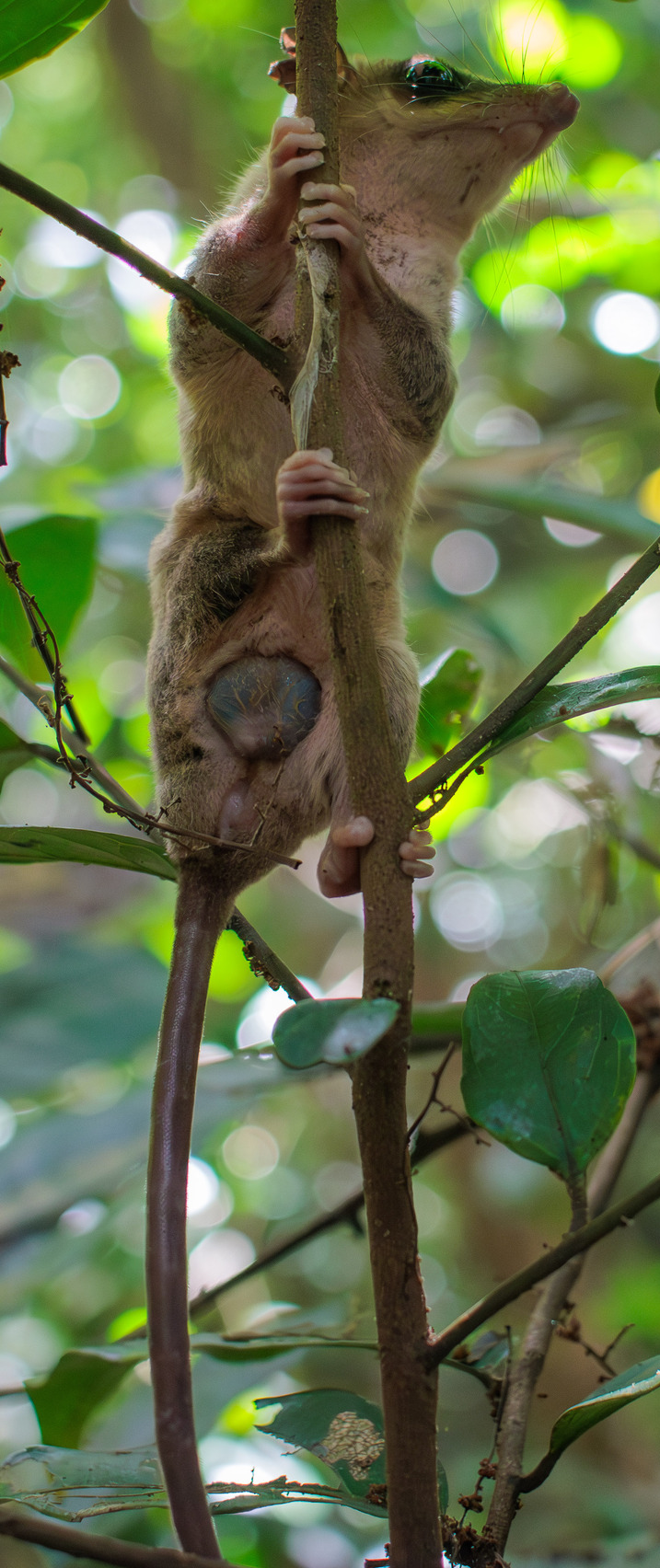

Conservation status
- Least Concern (IUCN 3.1)

Scientific classification
- Kingdom: Animalia
- Phylum: Chordata
- Class: Mammalia
- Infraclass: Marsupialia
- Order: Didelphimorphia
- Family: Didelphidae
- Genus: Marmosa
- Subgenus: Marmosa
- Species: M. murina

Binomial name
- Marmosa murina (Linnaeus, 1758)
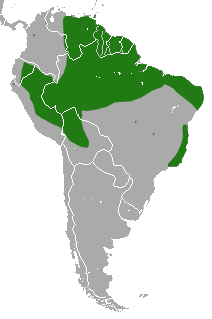
- Linnaeus's mouse opossum range

Synonyms
- Didelphis murina Linnaeus, 1758; Didelphis dorsigera Linnaeus, 1758

= Linnaeus's mouse opossum =

Species of marsupial

Linnaeus's mouse opossum (Marmosa murina), also known as the common or murine mouse opossum, is a South American marsupial of the family Didelphidae.

== Range and habitat ==
Its range includes Colombia, Mexico, Venezuela, Trinidad and Tobago, Guyana, Suriname, French Guiana, Brazil, eastern Ecuador, eastern Peru, and eastern Bolivia.

This opossum is most commonly sighted near forest streams and human habitation. A nocturnal creature, it shelters during the day in a mesh of twigs on a tree branch, a tree hole, or an old bird's nest.

== Behavior ==
It eats insects, spiders, lizards, bird's eggs, chicks, and fruits.

Linnaeus's mouse opossum has a gestation period of approximately 13 days, and gives birth to 5–10 young.

The mouse opossum will "play dead" if it thinks that it is in danger, it will even smell as if it were dead.

== Description ==
It is pale beige to grey on its underparts with short, smooth fur. Its face appears to have a black mask on it, its eyes are prominent, and its ears are very upright. Its tail, which females use to carry leaves, is much longer than the rest of its body.

Linnaeus's mouse opossum has a body length of approximately 11–14.5 centimetres (4.3–5.7 in), with a tail of approximately 13.5–21 cm (5.3–8.3 in) long. It weighs about 250 grams (8.8 oz).
