= Tateanthus =

Scientific classification
- Kingdom: Plantae
- Clade: Tracheophytes
- Clade: Angiosperms
- Clade: Eudicots
- Clade: Rosids
- Order: Myrtales
- Family: Melastomataceae
- Genus: Tateanthus; Gleason

Species of flowering plant

Tateanthus is a monotypic genus of flowering plants belonging to the family Melastomataceae. It only contains one known species, Tateanthus duidae Gleason

It is native to northern Brazil and Venezuela.

The genus name of Tateanthus is in honour of George Henry Hamilton Tate (1894–1953), an English-born American zoologist and botanist, who worked as a mammalogist for the American Museum of Natural History in New York City. The Latin specific epithet of duidae refers to Cerro Duida (or Mount Duida). Both the genus and the species were first described and published in Bull. Torrey Bot. Club Vol.58 on page 424 in 1931.
