= Wirt Robinson =

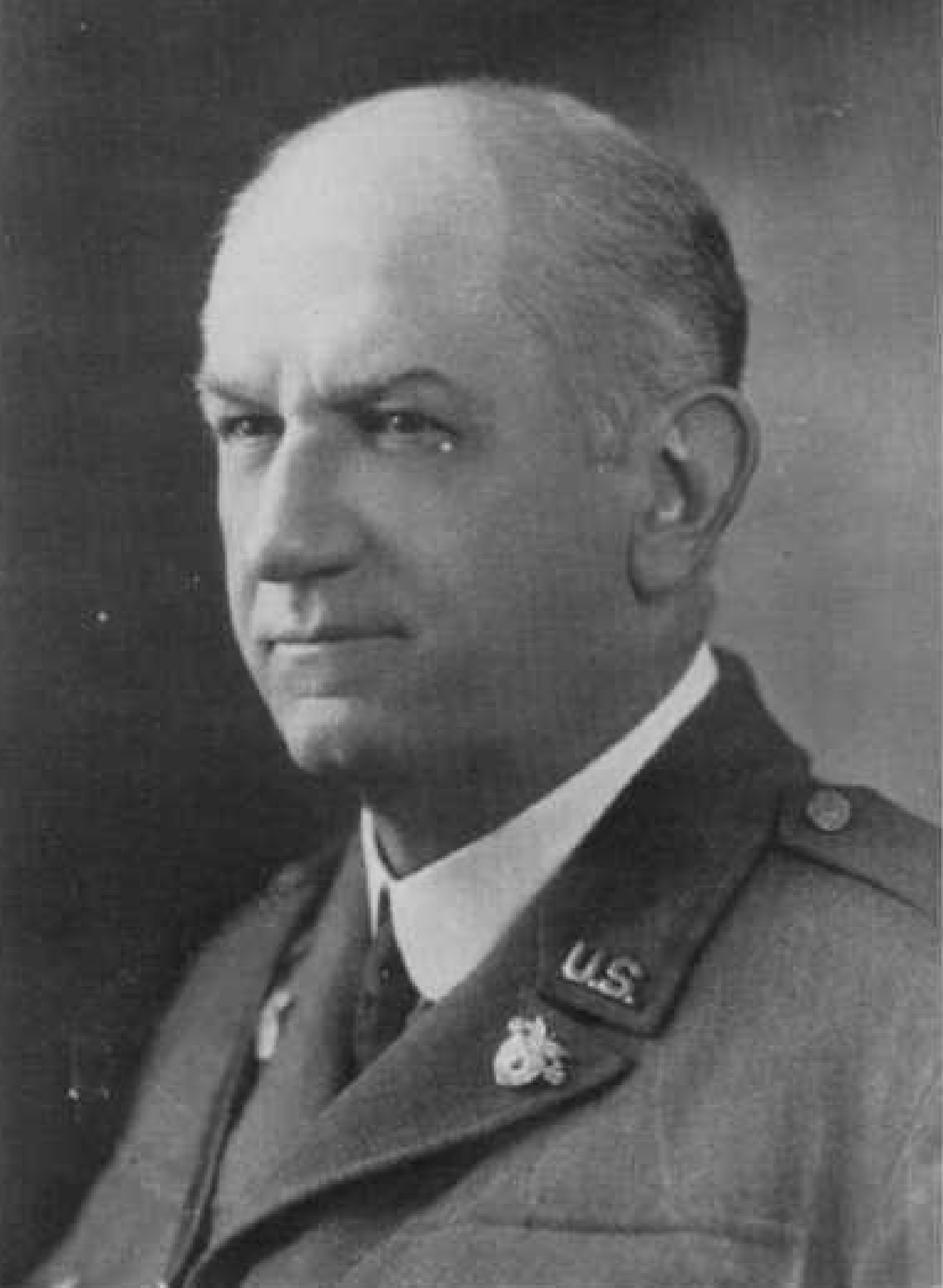

Colonel Wirt Robinson (16 October 1864 – 19 January 1929) was an American army officer and naturalist who served as a professor of chemistry, mineralogy and geology at the U. S. Military Academy. He also served briefly as a professor of military science at Harvard University. A Venezuelan opossum species Marmosa robinsoni was described from his collections and named after him.

== Life and work ==
Robinson was born at Fernley, Buckingham County, Virginia, son of William Russell and Evelyn Cabell. Fernley was a plantation begun by his grandfather Clifford Cabell on the edge of the James River and with dense forest. His father and maternal grandfather inculcated an interest in natural history at an early age and he maintained a diary of observations. He was tutored privately before attending Richmond College (1879–1882) and studied a course in chemistry at the Richmond Medical College. He joined the military academy as a cadet in 1883 and joined the 4th artillery as a second lieutenant in 1887. He served at Fort Adams (R.I.), St. Augustine (Florida) and at Fort McPherson, Georgia. In 1891 he was posted to West Point as an instructor in modern languages. From 1894 to 1898 he served as an instructor of military science at Harvard University. After some military service from 1903 in Cuba, he studied and taught chemistry and explosives at the School of Submarine Defence, New York. From 1911 he served as a professor of chemistry, mineralogy and geology at the Military Academy. He wrote a textbook for cadets at the Military Academy, Elements of Electricity (1914). He retired in 1928 at the age of 45 and died at Washington, D.C.

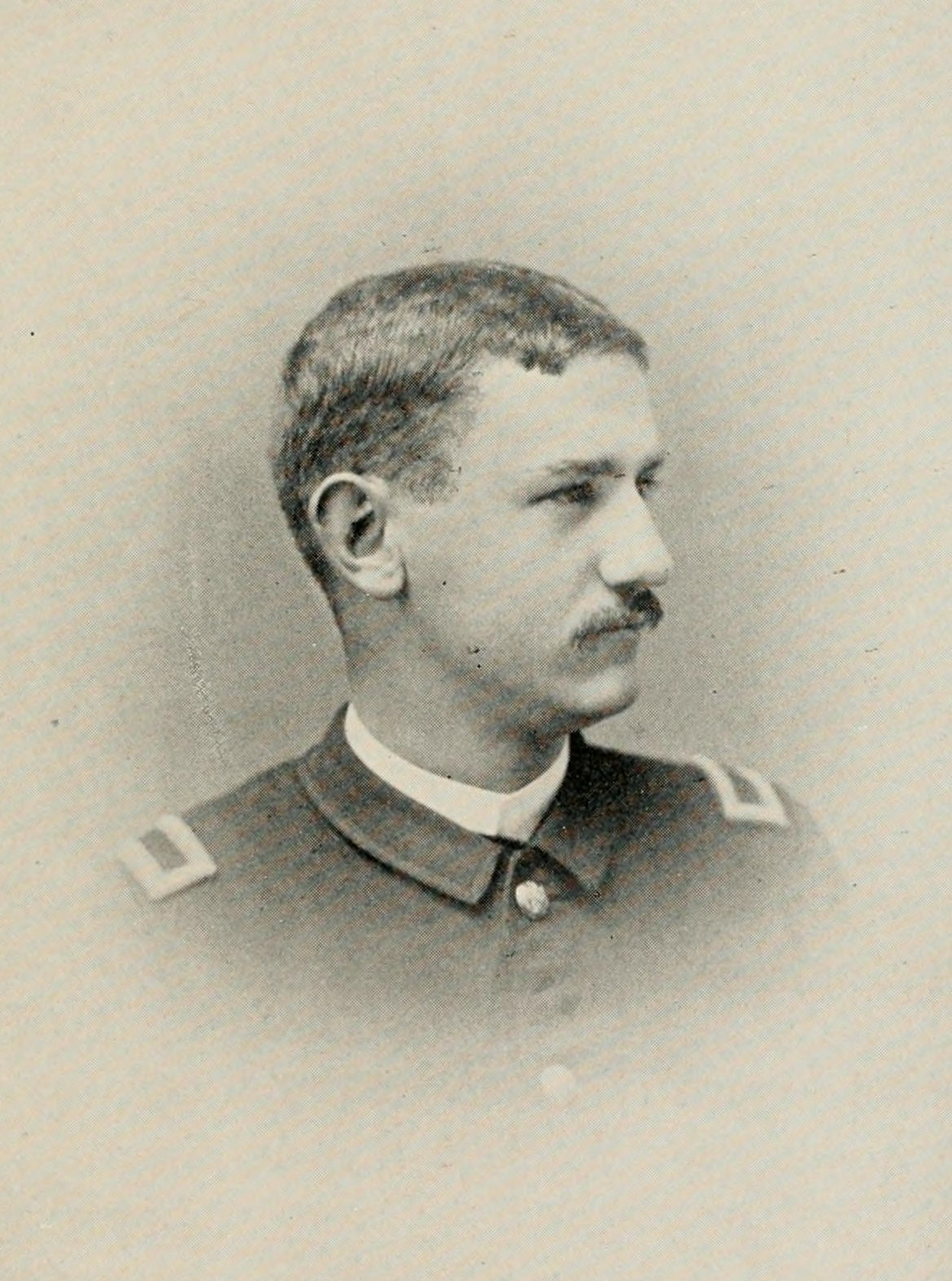
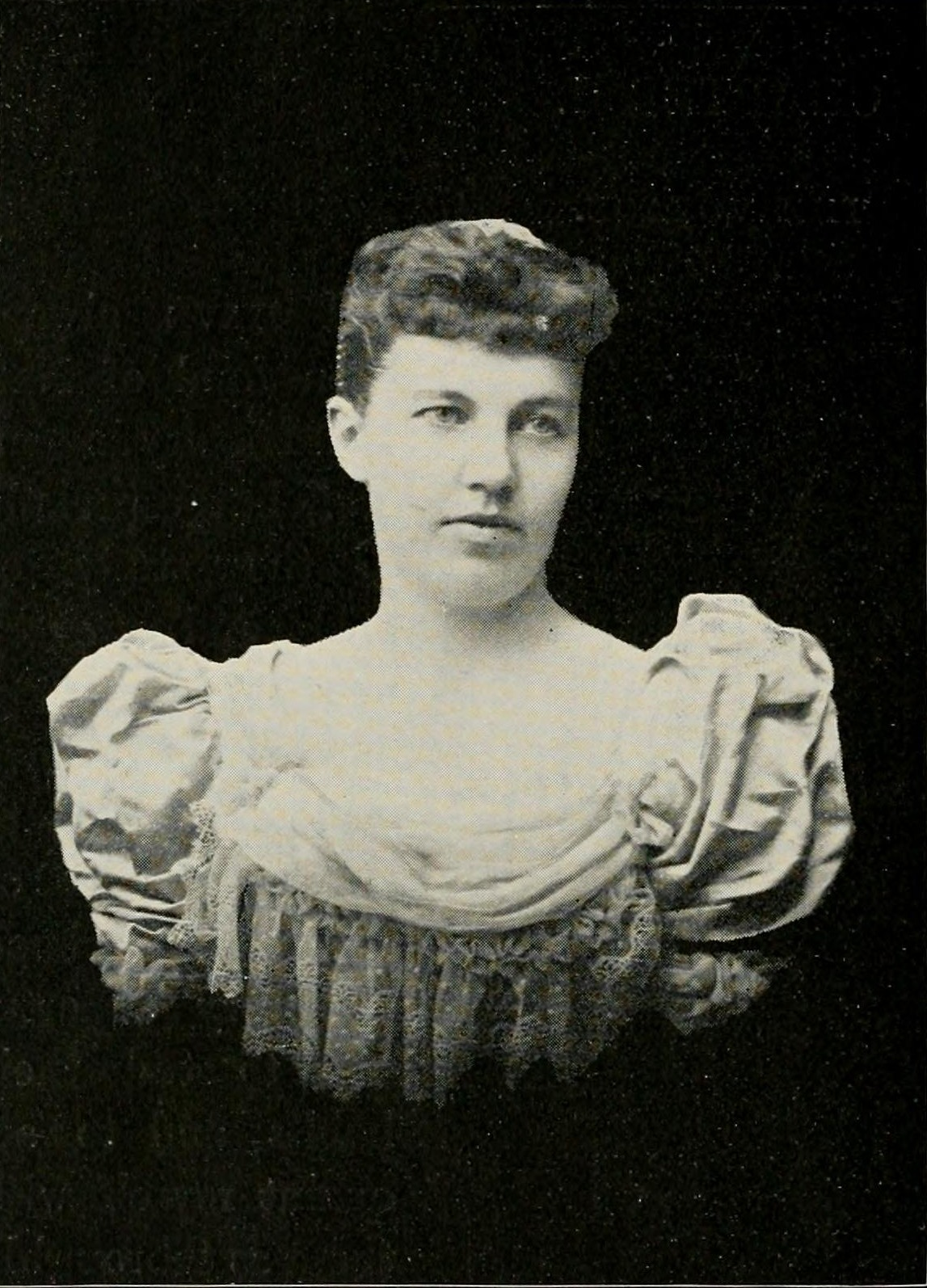
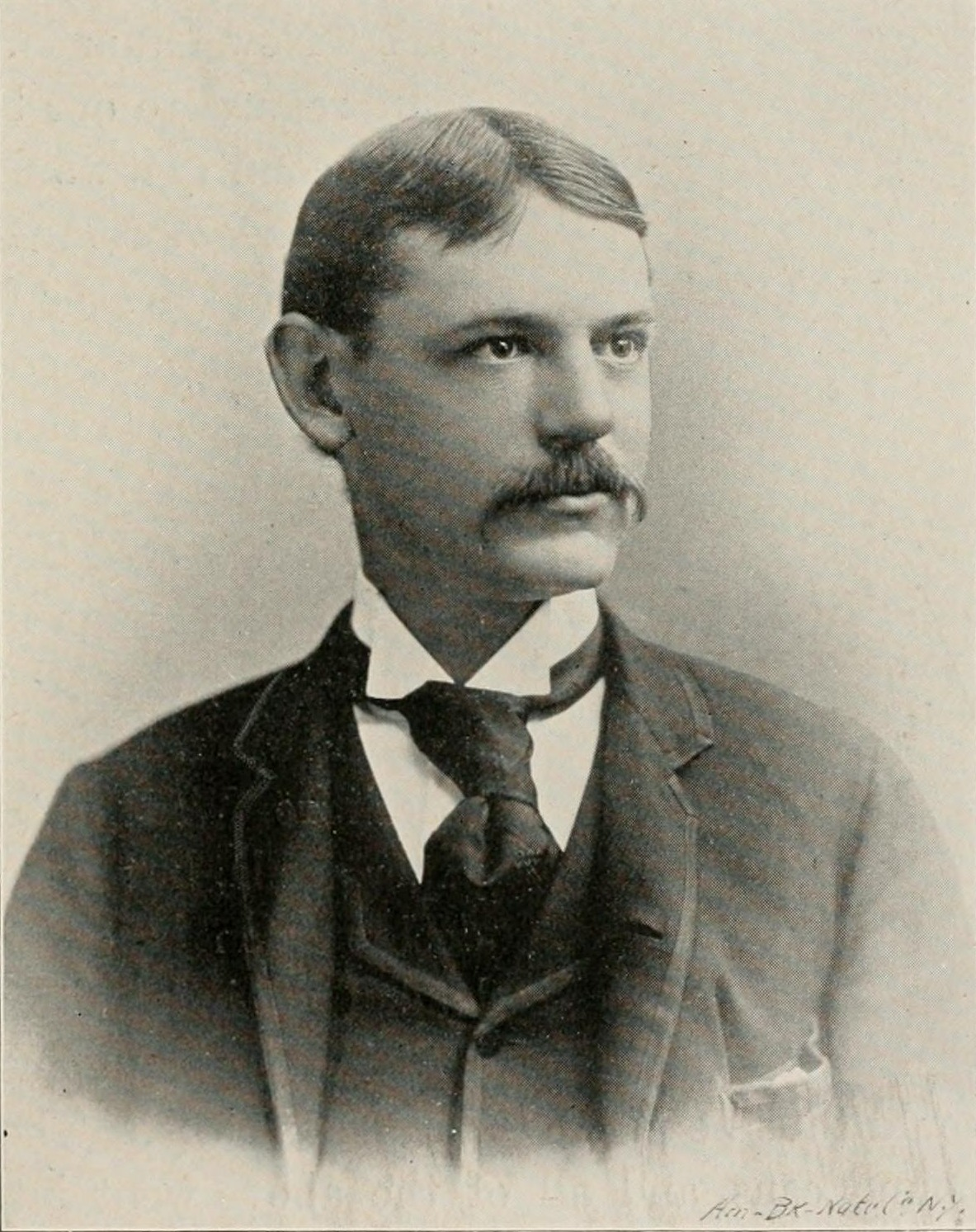
Wirt, his wife Alice, and brother "Cabell" in 1895

Robinson collected specimens of natural history and anthropology during his travels. His first major trip in 1892 was to the island of Curaçao in Columbia accompanied by his wife (Alice after whom the bird Amazilia aliciae was named but is now treated as a subspecies of the copper-rumped hummingbird) and brother Clifford “Cabell” Robinson. He wrote about the journey in A Flying Trip to the Tropics (1895). In 1900 he visited La Guaira with M. W. Lyon Jr. He established a private collection at his home in Wingina and collected across taxonomic groups, including a large number of insects in Jamaica, Venezuela and other places. He also made observations on birds in life, an interest he gained in early life from his father. Marmosa robinsoni was named after him from a specimen he had collected on Margarita Island, Venezuela in 1895. Other species named after him include a beetle Arthromacra robinsoni and an island form of the vermilion cardinal which was named as Cardinalis robinsoni but not considered a valid subspecies. He also collected skeleton remains from native American burials.

Robinson married Alice Phinney, of Newport in 1890 and after her death in 1918 he married Nancy Hinman Henderson in 1920. A son was born from the first marriage and a daughter from the second.
