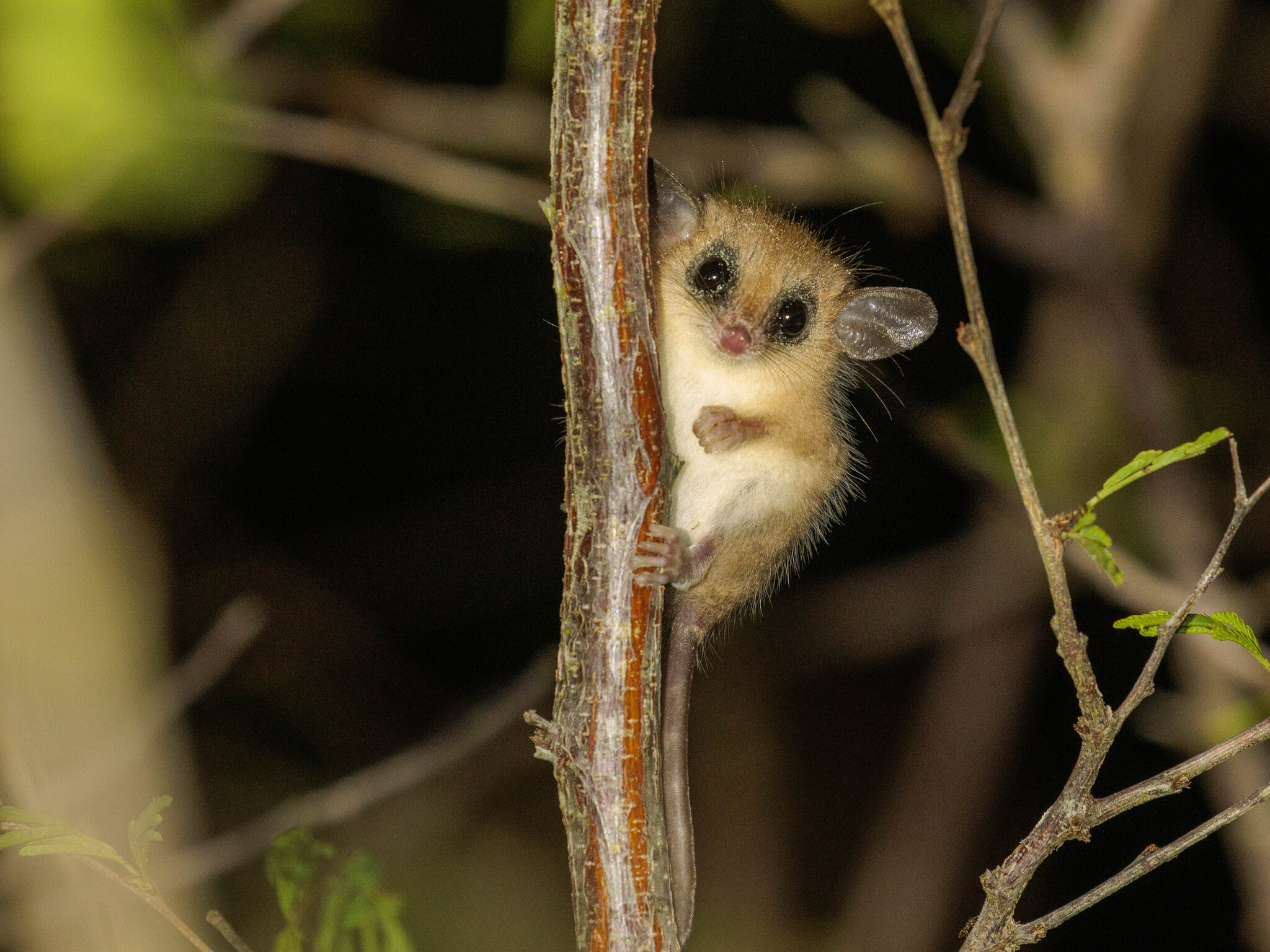
- Paraíba, Brazil

Conservation status
- Data Deficient (IUCN 3.1)

Scientific classification
- Kingdom: Animalia
- Phylum: Chordata
- Class: Mammalia
- Infraclass: Marsupialia
- Order: Didelphimorphia
- Family: Didelphidae
- Genus: Cryptonanus
- Species: C. agricolai

Binomial name
- Cryptonanus agricolai (Moojen, 1943)
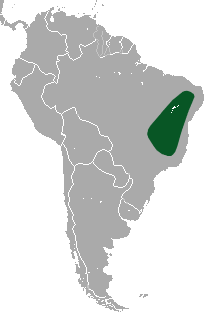
- Agricola's gracile opossum range

Synonyms
- Gracilinanus agricolai (Moojen, 1943)

= Agricola's gracile opossum =

Species of marsupial

Agricola's gracile opossum (Cryptonanus agricolai) is a species of opossum in the family Didelphidae endemic to eastern Brazil. Its habitat is the caatinga and cerrado. While its conservation status has not been determined, expansion of agricultural activities is leading to loss of some of its habitat. There are several protected areas in the species' range but it has not been collected from these areas. The species is named after Brazilian physician Ernani Agricola.
