= Wood sprite gracile opossum =

Conservation status
- Least Concern (IUCN 3.1)

Scientific classification
- Kingdom: Animalia
- Phylum: Chordata
- Class: Mammalia
- Infraclass: Marsupialia
- Order: Didelphimorphia
- Family: Didelphidae
- Genus: Gracilinanus
- Species: G. dryas

Binomial name
- Gracilinanus dryas (Thomas, 1898)
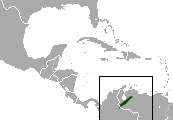
- Wood sprite gracile opossum range

Species of marsupial

The wood sprite gracile opossum (Gracilinanus dryas) is a mammal. It is a species of opossum in the family Didelphidae. It is found in Colombia and Venezuela. Its natural habitat is subtropical or tropical moist lowland forests. It is threatened by habitat loss.
