= Adler's mouse opossum =

Scientific classification
- Kingdom: Animalia
- Phylum: Chordata
- Class: Mammalia
- Infraclass: Marsupialia
- Order: Didelphimorphia
- Family: Didelphidae
- Genus: Marmosa
- Species: M. adleri

Binomial name
- Marmosa adleri Voss, Giarla, and Jansa, 2021

Species of opossum

The Adler's mouse opossum (Marmosa adleri) is a species of opossum in the Marmosa genus in the family Didelphidae.

== Discovery and naming ==
The Adler's mouse opossum was named after Greg Adler, a biologist at the University of Wisconsin–Oshkosh. This opossum was discovered in 2021 by a team of researchers from the American Museum of Natural History, Siena College, and the Bell Museum at the University of Minnesota.

== See also ==
- List of living mammal species described in the 2020s
