= Guajira mouse opossum =

Conservation status
- Vulnerable (IUCN 3.1)

Scientific classification
- Kingdom: Animalia
- Phylum: Chordata
- Class: Mammalia
- Infraclass: Marsupialia
- Order: Didelphimorphia
- Family: Didelphidae
- Genus: Marmosa
- Subgenus: Exulomarmosa
- Species: M. xerophila

Binomial name
- Marmosa xerophila Handley & Gordon, 1979
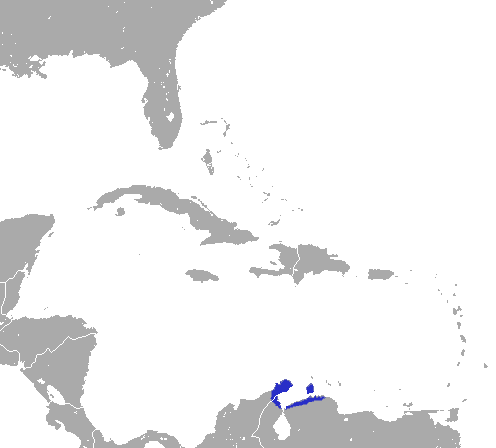
- Guajira mouse opossum range

Species of marsupial

The Guajira mouse opossum (Marmosa xerophila) is a species of opossum in the family Didelphidae. It is found in Colombia and Venezuela.
