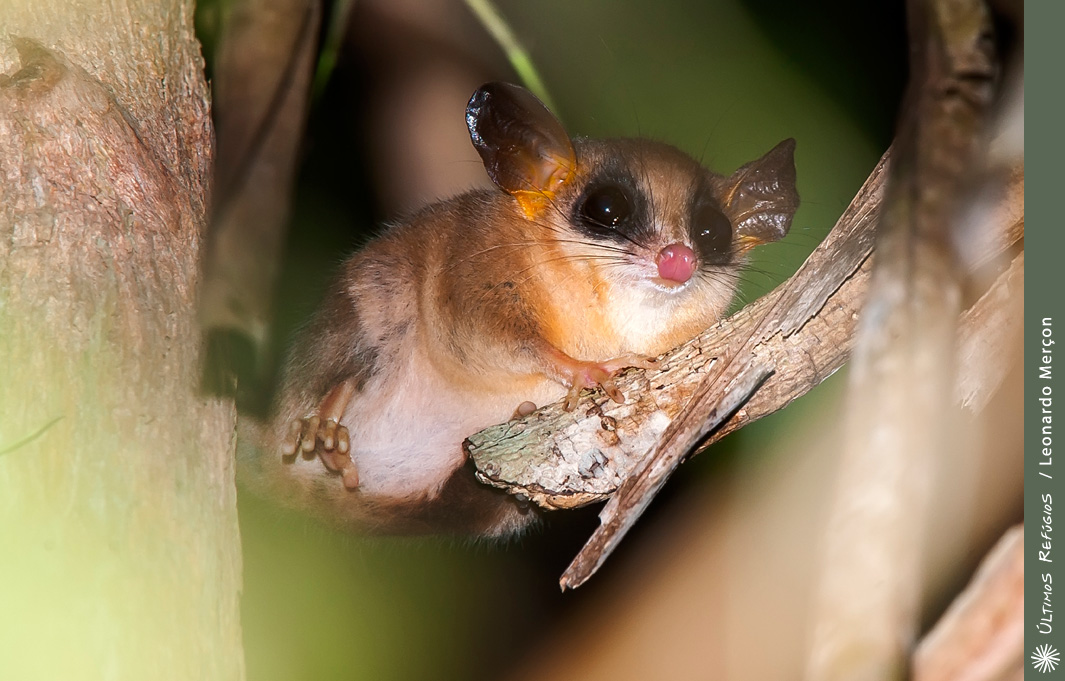

Conservation status
- Least Concern (IUCN 3.1)

Scientific classification
- Kingdom: Animalia
- Phylum: Chordata
- Class: Mammalia
- Infraclass: Marsupialia
- Order: Didelphimorphia
- Family: Didelphidae
- Genus: Gracilinanus
- Species: G. microtarsus

Binomial name
- Gracilinanus microtarsus (Wagner, 1842)
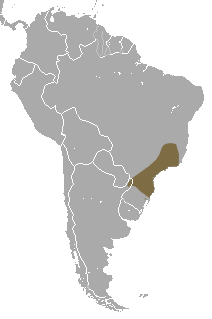
- Brazilian gracile opossum range

= Brazilian gracile opossum =

Species of marsupial

The Brazilian gracile opossum (Gracilinanus microtarsus) is a species of small opossum from Brazil.

== Description ==
Brazilian gracile opossums are relatively small opossums, with males ranging from 86 to 129 millimetres (3.4 to 5.1 in) and females from 81 to 116 millimetres (3.2 to 4.6 in) in snout-to-rump length. The tail is an additional several inches, and makes up between 30 and 50% of the animal's total length. Males weigh 17 to 52 grams (0.60 to 1.83 oz) and females from 12 to 37 grams (0.42 to 1.31 oz).

The gracile opossum's coat comes in various colors and tones, including beige, sandy-or amber-tinted, with darker ears and extremities. Additionally, many individuals have fur that makes use of countershading, likely to avoid predators when in the trees. Much like whales, penguins, and numerous marine species, for example, countershading is the top half of an animal's body being colored darker than the lighter underbelly, and possibly extending to the chin. Gracile opossums often display reddish, dark brown or grey over most of their body, with paler, cream-colored undersides. This helps them stay camouflaged from threats in the trees, both from above and below. The fur on the face is also relatively pale, with distinct rings of near-black fur around each eye.

The tail is very sensitive, prehensile, somewhat scaly, and does not store fat as it does in some related species. The hands and digits are somewhat monkey-like, for an arboreal lifestyle; being relatively long, they are equipped with small, efficient nails/claws.

The female typically has fifteen teats, although the exact number can vary; the majority are on the chest, with the remainder (including a single median teat) being on the abdomen.

== Distribution and habitat ==
The Brazilian gracile opossum is found only in Brazil, being endemic to the south-eastern parts of the country, from Espírito Santo to Rio Grande do Sul. It inhabits rainforests and partly deciduous forests scattered in the southern regions of the cerrado ecoregion, but, being able to forage successfully on the ground, is less affected by fragmentation of forest habitats than more purely arboreal animals. It has also been found in artificial plantations.

There are no recognised subspecies.

== Behavior ==
Brazilian gracile opossums are arboreal and nocturnal, spending the day nesting in tree hollows. They are solitary animals, with each individual inhabiting a home range of anything from 0.03 to 0.32 hectares (0.074 to 0.791 acres), depending on habitat. Males tend to have larger home ranges than females, presumably because, being larger, they require more food.

The species is insectivorous, and is an opportunistic forager, not specialising in any particular kind of insect. Individuals have also been reported to eat some spiders, snails, and even fruit (including passionfruit). Predators of Brazilian gracile opossums include ocelots, oncillas, crab-eating foxes, maned wolves and white-tailed hawks.

== Reproduction ==
Females come into estrus once a year, between August and September. Litters of up to twelve young are born during the wet season, when food is plentiful. The mother does not possess a pouch. They are weaned by three months of age, between November and December. The young are fully grown, with an adult set of teeth, by six months, reaching sexual maturity within a year of birth. Most Brazilian gracile opossums do not survive for much longer than a year, but some can reach two years of age.
