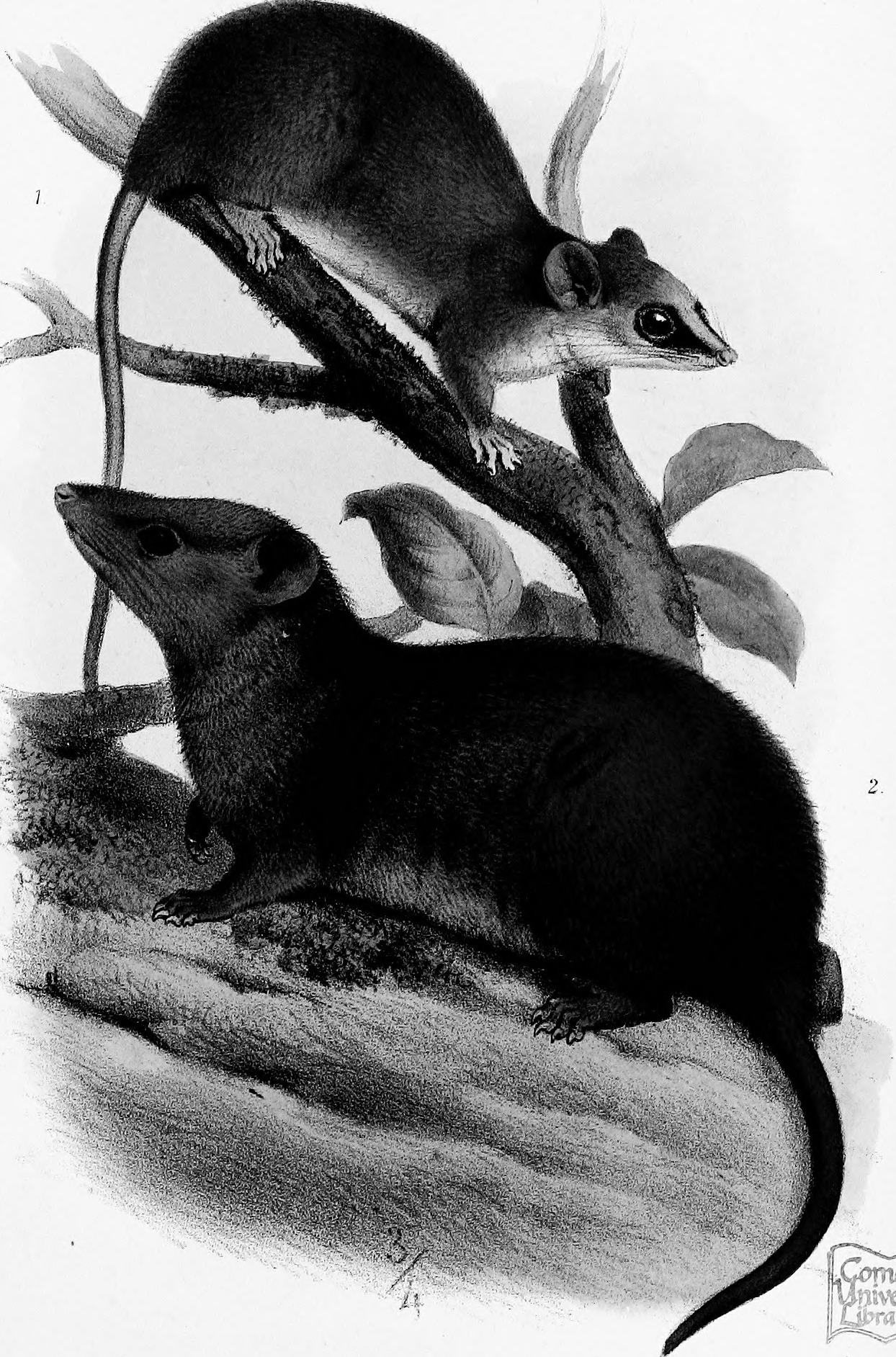
- Rufous mouse opossum (above) and long-nosed short-tailed opossum (below)

Conservation status
- Least Concern (IUCN 3.1)

Scientific classification
- Kingdom: Animalia
- Phylum: Chordata
- Class: Mammalia
- Infraclass: Marsupialia
- Order: Didelphimorphia
- Family: Didelphidae
- Genus: Marmosa
- Subgenus: Stegomarmosa
- Species: M. lepida

Binomial name
- Marmosa lepida (Thomas, 1888)
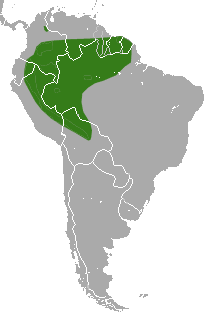
- Rufous mouse opossum range

= Rufous mouse opossum =

Species of marsupial

The rufous mouse opossum (Marmosa lepida) or little rufous mouse opossum is an opossum species from South America. The species has been found in Bolivia, French Guinea, Brazil, Colombia, Ecuador, Guyana, Peru and Suriname in lowland tropical rainforest at altitudes from 100 to 1,000 m (330 to 3,280 ft). It is presumed to feed on insects and fruit, like its close relatives.

It is considered a monotype. It is smaller in size and has a brighter red colored fur, distinguishing it from other congeners.

Though the species has been known for over a century, very few specimens have been studied, most of these from areas below 600 m (2,000 ft) and taken from western edges of the Amazon basin and Guianas. Its dorsal pelage is reddish-brown and its ventral pelage is grayish. Researchers believe this coloring is product of adaptation to a humid forest environment.

Potential predators of this opossum include snakes, owls, and wild felids.
