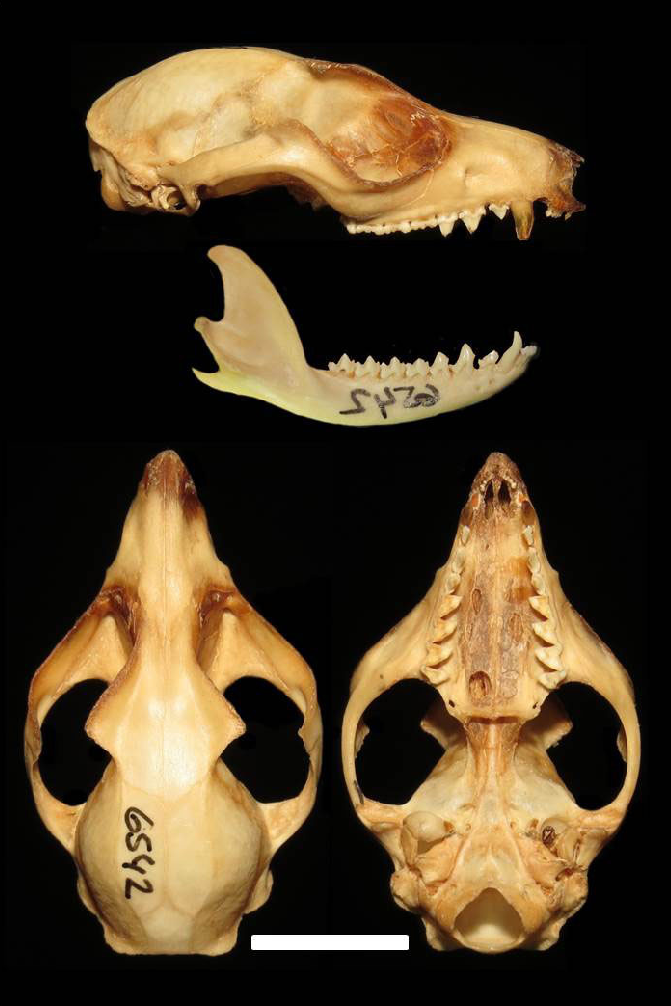

Conservation status
- Data Deficient (IUCN 3.1)

Scientific classification
- Kingdom: Animalia
- Phylum: Chordata
- Class: Mammalia
- Infraclass: Marsupialia
- Order: Didelphimorphia
- Family: Didelphidae
- Genus: Marmosa
- Subgenus: Stegomarmosa
- Species: M. andersoni

Binomial name
- Marmosa andersoni Pine, 1972
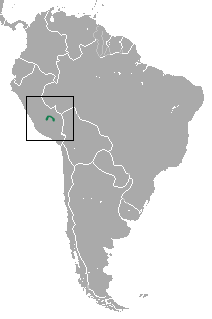
- Heavy-browed mouse opossum range

= Heavy-browed mouse opossum =

Species of marsupial

The heavy-browed mouse opossum (Marmosa andersoni), or Anderson's mouse opossum, is a species of opossum in the family Didelphidae. It is endemic to a restricted range in southern Peru. This opossum inhabits forests; it is nocturnal and probably arboreal.

== Description ==
As only seven individuals have been observed, the species as a whole is limited in description. The dark grey fur on the upper parts is relatively long and tipped with reddish-brown, while the underside is paler. The hair on the cheeks and chin is cream colored, and prominent black rings surround the eyes. Anderson's mouse opossum has large thin ears, providing acute hearing. The tail, which is longer than the head and body, is furry at the base, with bristles that become longer and more slender towards the tip. Each foot has five digits and the big toe on the hindfoot is opposable, which, along with its prehensile tail, makes Anderson's mouse opossums well adapted for a life in the trees.

== Habitat ==
Little is known about the ecology of this species. It is nocturnal and may be arboreal. The diet of Marmosa consists largely of insects and fruits but also lizards, bird eggs and small rodents. The second locality where was captured this species is a mixture of forest and bamboo.

== Range ==
Anderson's mouse opossum is known from only three localities, within a narrow strip along the base of the Andes, in Cusco, and southern Peru.

== Reproduction ==
Anderson's mouse opossum is known only from one individual collected in 1954, and several more specimens caught in the late 1990s, and thus very little is known about the biology of this incredibly rare animal. However, much can be deduced from studies of closely related species. It is likely to be nocturnal, and spend most of its time in trees. Like all marsupials, gestation is probably short, with females' giving birth to poorly developed young and most of the development taking place during lactation. It is likely that reproduction is similar to that of Marmosa robinsoni, which gives birth to 6 to 14 young after a gestation period of just 14 days. The tiny young, measuring only up to 12 millimeters, attach themselves to the mother's mammae where they may remain for around 30 days. Unlike many marsupials, female mouse opossums do not possess a pouch to protect the young as they develop. The young are so undeveloped their eyes do not open until 39 to 40 days. It is likely that the young are completely weaned after around 65 days, and they may have an incredibly short life span of only one year. Marmosa species build nests for shelter, or use abandoned bird nests, holes in trees, or banana stalks. These nest sites are unlikely to be permanent; rather, the opossum will use whatever site is available as the sun begins to rise. Like M. robinsoni, it is likely that Anderson's mouse opossum is insectivorous, with fruit also playing an important role in the diet.

== Conservation ==
There are no major threats. In the one Western locality, there are natural gas fields in the Camisea region, which are being extracted; however, this is localized. Within the projected range, there is not a high rate of deforestation. In the vicinity of the eastern locality, there are threats including expanding coca crop.
