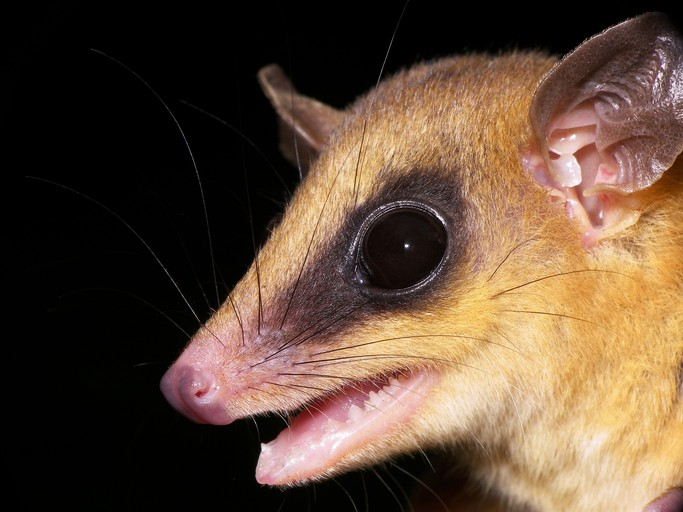

Conservation status
- Least Concern (IUCN 3.1)

Scientific classification
- Kingdom: Animalia
- Phylum: Chordata
- Class: Mammalia
- Infraclass: Marsupialia
- Order: Didelphimorphia
- Family: Didelphidae
- Genus: Marmosa
- Subgenus: Exulomarmosa
- Species: M. robinsoni

Binomial name
- Marmosa robinsoni Bangs, 1898
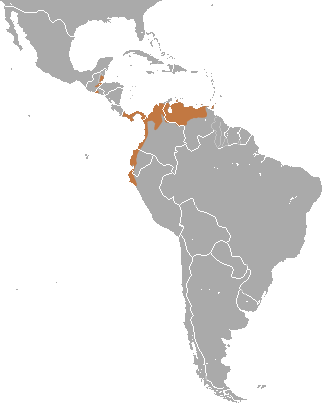
- Robinson's mouse opossum range

= Robinson's mouse opossum =

Species of marsupial

Robinson's mouse opossum (Marmosa robinsoni) is a species of opossum in the family Didelphidae. It is found in Belize, Colombia, Ecuador, Grenada, Honduras, Panama, Peru, Trinidad and Tobago, and Venezuela.

Robinson's mouse opossums move along tree branches and vines with the help of a prehensile tail and may leap between gaps as they search for fruit and insects. The species is named after Wirt Robinson, the collector of the specimen from which it was first described.

== Description ==
Marmosa robinsoni is typically cinnamon brown with a yellow underside. Its dorsal color varies from russet to gray. The top of the head is generally paler in color than the rest of the body. The black facial mask is always present but varies in size according to the region of that individual. It possesses a prehensile tail about 1.3 times its body length, which is covered in fine white hairs. Its feet are modified for grasping with pads and an opposable hallux.

== Habitat ==
The species was originally collected on Margarita Island, Venezuela. It occupies a variety of habitats from sea level to 2,600 m elevation, including lowland and montane moist forests, lowland dry forests, mangroves, savannas, and xeric shrublands.

A study conducted in a xeric shrubland of northwestern Venezuela found that females of Marmosa robinsoni increase in mass three time faster than males. The same study also found that individual of both sexes typically are active in areas of approximately 25 m^{2}, but pregnant females dramatically reduce such area to ca. 1–6 m^{2}. There are observations that M. robinsoni feeds on fruits of columnar cacti, although the species is also expected to prey on insects (as many didelphids do). In Venezuela, specimens inhabiting agricultural lands and disturbed forests are larger than those from cloud and gallery forest likely due to the higher productivity of the former habitats.

== Behavior ==
Marmosa robinsoni generally first appears as sunset and is active intermittently until sunrise. These activity periods usual begin with a grooming session with special attention given to the face and snout. Based on current observations it appears to be a solitary species in the wild. Captivity showed the formation of social hierarchies. This hierarchy is related to reproduction and involves the males asserting their dominance by marking their cages with an oily secretion. M. robinsoni is insectivorous, with fruit also playing an important role in the diet. It will also feed on earthworms, birds, bats and mice.

== Range ==
The known distribution of Marmosa robinsoni extends from Finca Santa Clara in the western Panamanian province of Chiriquì, eastward across the isthmus to Colombia and northern Venezuela. Although most Venezuelan specimens are from north of the Orinoco River, found one specimen from Ciudad Bolivar on the south (right) bank of the river in Bolivar state. The species is also known from several islands on the continental shelf of Central America (e.g., Isla del Rey, Isla Saboga) and South America (Isla Margarita, Trinidad, and Tobago), and from the Caribbean island of Grenada.

== Reproduction ==
Marmosa robinsoni reproduces according to a simple schedule. It gives birth to 6 to 14 young after a gestation period of just 14 days. The tiny young, measuring only up to 12 millimeters, attach themselves to the mother's mammae where they may remain for around 30 days. Unlike many marsupials, female mouse opossums do not possess a pouch to protect the young as they develop. The young are so undeveloped their eyes do not open until 39 to 40 days. It is likely that the young are completely weaned after around 65 days, and they may have an incredibly short life span of only one year. Marmosa species build nests for shelter, or use abandoned bird nests, holes in trees, or banana stalks. These nest sites are unlikely to be permanent; rather, the opossum will use whatever site is available as the sun begins to rise.

== Conservation ==
There are no current threats to this species, except for the reduction of its habitat from deforestation or resource obtainment.
