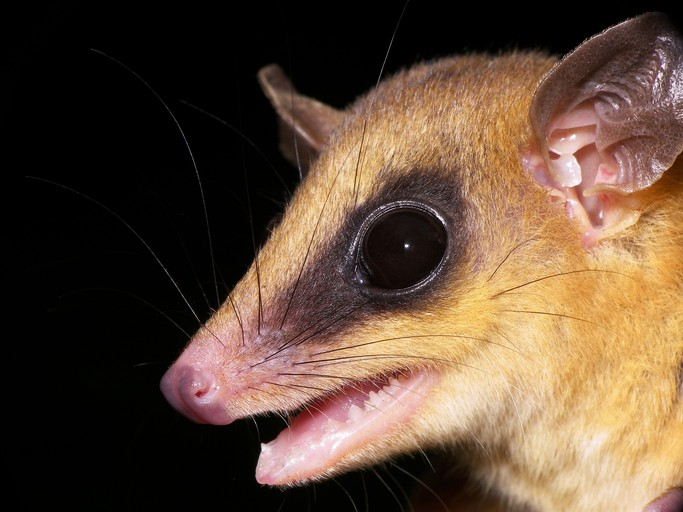
- Robinson's mouse opossum (Marmosa robinsoni)

Scientific classification
- Kingdom: Animalia
- Phylum: Chordata
- Class: Mammalia
- Infraclass: Marsupialia
- Order: Didelphimorphia
- Family: Didelphidae
- Subfamily: Didelphinae
- Tribe: Marmosini
- Genus: Marmosa; J. E. Gray, 1821

Type species
- Didelphis marina J. E. Gray, 1821 (incorrect spelling of Didelphis murina Linnaeus, 1758)

Subgenera
- Eomarmosa; Exulomarmosa; Marmosa; Micoureus; Stegomarmosa

= Marmosa =

Genus of marsupials

The 29 species in the genus Marmosa are relatively small Neotropical members of the family Didelphidae. This genus is one of three that are known as mouse opossums. The others are Thylamys (the "fat-tailed mouse opossums") and Tlacuatzin, the grayish mouse opossum. Members of the genus Marmosops used to be called "slender mouse opossums", but are now just called "slender opossums". The thirteen members of the Marmosa subgenus Micoureus, known as woolly mouse opossums, were formerly considered to be a separate genus, but were moved into Marmosa in 2009. Based on a comparison of sequences of one mitochondrial and three nuclear genes, three new subgenera, Eomarmosa, Exulomarmosa and Stegomarmosa, were recognized by Voss et al. in 2014. Eomarmosa and Exulomarmosa, as well as Marmosa and Micoureus, are thought to be sister taxa, while Stegomarmosa is viewed as sister to Marmosa plus Micoureus. Exulomarmosa is a mostly trans-Andean (west of the Andes) clade.

== Phylogeny ==
According to Pavan et al (2025), the relations of Marmosa are as follows:

- Marmosa
  - - Eomarmosa
      M. rubra
    - Exulomarmosa
      - M. simonsi
      - - - M. robinsoni
          - M. xerophila
        - - M. isthmica
          - - M. mexicana
            - M. zeledoni
  - - Stegomarmosa
      - M. andersoni
      - - M. chachapoya
        - M. lepida
    - - Marmosa
        - M. tyleriana
        - - M. waterhousei
          - - M. murina
            - M. macrotarsus
      - Micoureus
        - - M. rapposa
          - - M. parda
            - M. rutteri
        - - - M. germana
            - - M. nicaraguae
              - - M. adleri
                - M. alstoni
          - - M. paraguayana
            - - - M. perplexa
                - M. jansae
              - - M. cf. meridae
                - - M. cf. phaea
                  - - M. constantiae
                    - M. demerarae

=== Species list ===
Subgenus Eomarmosa Voss, Gutierrez, Solari, Rossi & Jansa 2014

- Marmosa rubra Tate, 1931

Subgenus Exulomarmosa Voss, Gutierrez, Solari, Rossi & Jansa 2014

- Marmosa isthmica Goldman. 1912
- Marmosa mexicana Merriam, 1897
- Marmosa robinsoni Bangs, 1898
- Marmosa simonsi Thomas, 1899
- Marmosa xerophila Handley & Gordon, 1979
- Marmosa zeledoni Goldman, 1911

Subgenus Marmosa J. E. Gray 1821

- Marmosa macrotarsus (Wagner, 1842)
- Marmosa murina (Linnaeus, 1758)
- Marmosa tyleriana Tate 1931
- Marmosa waterhousei (Tomes, 1860)

Subgenus Micoureus Lesson 1842

- Marmosa adleri Voss, Giarla, & Jansa, 2021
- Marmosa alstoni (J. A. Allen, 1900)
- Marmosa constantiae Thomas, 1900
- Marmosa demerarae Thomas, 1905
- Marmosa germana Thomas, 1904
- Marmosa jansae Voss & Giarla, 2021
- Marmosa limae Thomas, 1920
- Marmosa meridae Tate, 1931
- Marmosa nicaraguae Thomas, 1905
- Marmosa paraguayana Tate, 1931
- Marmosa parda Tate, 1931
- Marmosa perplexa Anthony, 1922
- Marmosa phaea Thomas, 1899
- Marmosa rapposa Thomas, 1899
- Marmosa rutteri Thomas, 1924

Subgenus Stegomarmosa Pine, 1972

- Marmosa andersoni Pine, 1972
- Marmosa chachapoya Pavan, Abreu, Sánchez-Vendizú and Voss, 2025
- Marmosa lepida (Thomas, 1888)
