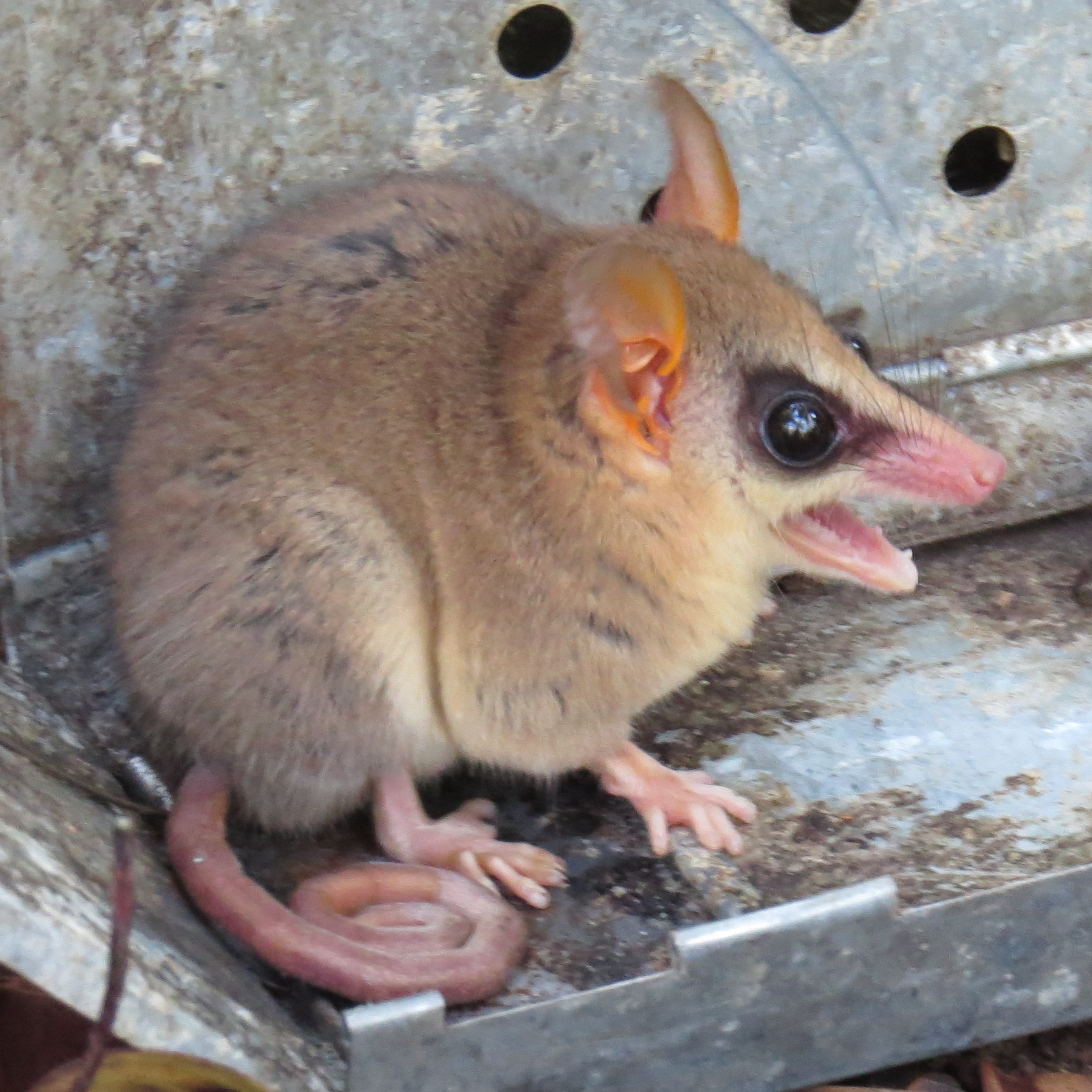

Conservation status
- Least Concern (IUCN 3.1)

Scientific classification
- Kingdom: Animalia
- Phylum: Chordata
- Class: Mammalia
- Infraclass: Marsupialia
- Order: Didelphimorphia
- Family: Didelphidae
- Genus: Gracilinanus
- Species: G. agilis

Binomial name
- Gracilinanus agilis (Burmeister, 1854)
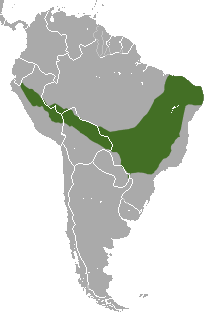
- Agile gracile opossum range

= Agile gracile opossum =

Species of marsupial

The agile gracile opossum (Gracilinanus agilis) is an opossum species from South America. It is found in Argentina, Bolivia, Brazil, Colombia, Peru, Paraguay, and Uruguay.

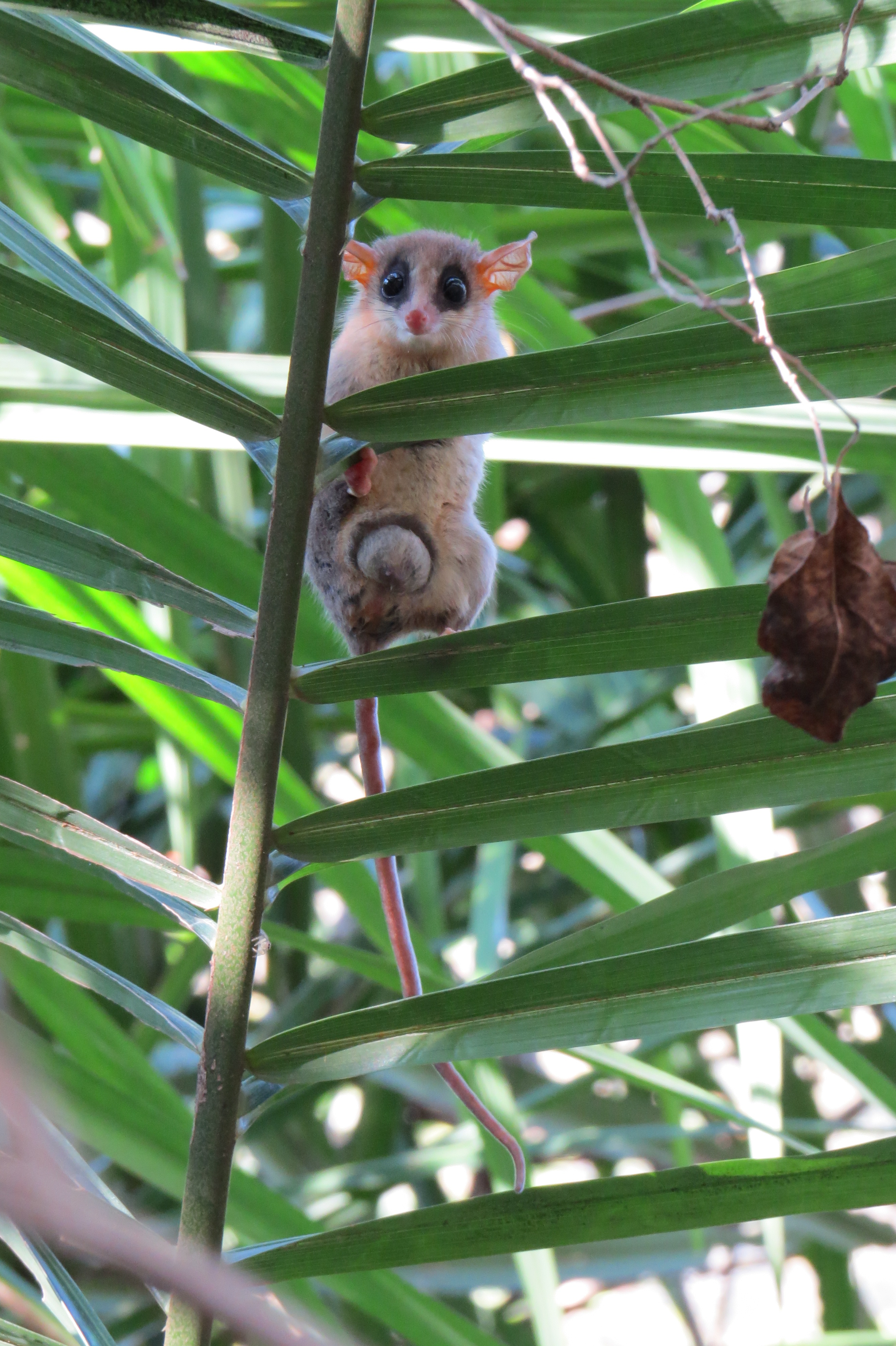
Gracilinanus agilis in an acuri palm

It is nocturnal, arboreal and frequents the forest understory, where they use slender branches and vines. Found in evergreen and gallery forests. It is a characteristic inhabitant of the gallery forest of southern South America but has broad habitat tolerance. It has been caught under fallen trunks, in tree holes, and in moist woodland. It is reported to be an adept climber, and nests made of vegetation have been found 1.6 m off the ground. One such nest contained seven individuals. In eastern Paraguay it has usually been captured in vegetation but sometimes has been caught on the ground. This marsupial is found throughout the Brazilian cerrado, usually associated with mesic areas such as gallery forests. This mouse opossum is reported to have up to twelve young. Females lack a true pouch, and the teats remain hidden when the female is not lactating. Gracilinanus agilis has a semelparous life cycle.
