= George Henry Hamilton Tate =

American zoologist and botanist (1894–1953)

George Henry Hamilton Tate (April 30, 1894 – December 24, 1953) was a British-born American zoologist and botanist, who worked as a mammalogist for the American Museum of Natural History in New York City. In his lifetime he wrote several books on subjects such as the South American mouse opossums and the mammals of the Pacific and East Asia.

== Biography ==
He was born in London on April 30, 1894. He had a brother, Geoffrey Tate.

In 1912 he migrated from Britain to New York City with his family. From 1912 to 1914 he worked as telegraph operator on Long Island. He then joined the British Army to fight in World War I. At the end of the war, he studied at the Imperial College of Science and Technology in London without taking a degree. He then migrated back to the United States and became a field assistant in mammalogy at the American Museum of Natural History. In 1927 he completed his B.S. at Columbia University in Manhattan, and became a United States citizen.

In September 1927, sponsored by the American Museum of Natural History, he went to look for Paul Redfern, the missing aviator.

In 1931 he completed his M.S. at Columbia University. In 1932 he was promoted to assistant curator of mammals at the American Museum of Natural History. In 1938 he completed a D.Sc. at the University of Montreal. During World War II, he was chief of exploration for the American Rubber Development Corporation in Brazil. In 1942 he was promoted to associate curator at the American Museum of Natural History then promoted to curator in 1946.

He died on December 24, 1953, in Morristown, New Jersey.

Tate is commemorated in the scientific name of a species of South American lizard, Neusticurus tatei, and in the plant genus of Tateanthus (belonging to the family Melastomataceae) from Brazil and Venezuela.
