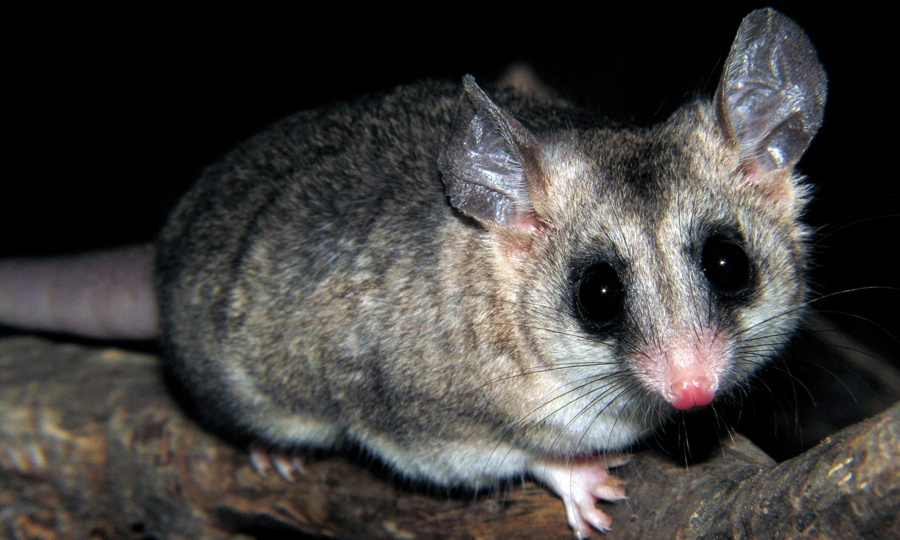

Conservation status
- Least Concern (IUCN 3.1)

Scientific classification
- Kingdom: Animalia
- Phylum: Chordata
- Class: Mammalia
- Infraclass: Marsupialia
- Order: Didelphimorphia
- Family: Didelphidae
- Genus: Thylamys
- Species: T. elegans

Binomial name
- Thylamys elegans (Waterhouse, 1839)
- Range of the elegant fat-tailed mouse opossum

Synonyms
- Didelphis elegans Waterhose, 1839; Didelphys soricina Philippi, 1894; Marmosa tatei Handley, 1956

= Elegant fat-tailed mouse opossum =

Species of marsupial

The elegant fat-tailed mouse opossum (Thylamys elegans), also known as the Chilean mouse opossum, is an opossum from central Chile. The type species of Thylamys, it was first described by English naturalist George Robert Waterhouse in 1839. This medium-sized opossum is characterized by black rings around the eyes, white limbs, gray to light brown coat, lighter flanks and underbelly and a thick 12.7–14.6 centimetres (5.0–5.7 in) long tail covered with hairs. It is crepuscular (active mainly around twilight) and lives in nests in tree hollows or under rocks and roots. This opossum feeds mainly on arthropods and larvae apart from fruits. Litter size is typically between 11 and 13. The elegant fat-tailed opossum can occur in a variety of habitats – from cloud forests to chaparrals. The IUCN classifies the opossum as least concern.

== Taxonomy and etymology ==
The elegant fat-tailed mouse opossum is the type species of Thylamys, and is placed in the family Didelphidae. It was first described by English naturalist George Robert Waterhouse as Didelphis elegans in 1839. It was given its present binomial name by English zoologist John Edward Gray in 1843.

The cladogram below, based on a 2016 study, shows the phylogenetic relationships of the elegant fat-tailed mouse opossum.

- - - - Patagonian opossum (Lestodelphys halli)
      - Thylamys
        - - Dwarf fat-tailed mouse opossum (T. velutinus)
          - Karimi's fat-tailed mouse opossum (T. karimii)
        - - - Buff-bellied fat-tailed mouse opossum (T. venustus)
            - - Cinderella fat-tailed mouse opossum (T. cinderella)
              - Argentine fat-tailed mouse opossum (T. sponsorius)
          - - Paraguayan fat-tailed mouse opossum (T. macrurus)
            - - - - Tate's fat-tailed mouse opossum (T. tatei)
                  - - Elegant fat-tailed mouse opossum (T. elegans)
                    - White-bellied fat-tailed mouse opossum (T. pallidior)
                - - T. citellus
                  - - T. pulchellus
                    - Common fat-tailed mouse opossum (T. pusillus)

The generic name is composed of the Greek words thylas ("pouch") and mys ("mouse"), and the specific name elegans means "elegant" in Latin. Alternate names for this mouse opossum include Chilean mouse opossum, comadreja, llaca, marmosa chilena, marmosa elegante and yaca.

== Description ==
The elegant fat-tailed mouse opossum is a medium-sized opossum characterized by white limbs, gray to light brown coat, lighter flanks and underbelly, and a thick 12.7–14.6 centimetres (5.0–5.7 in) long tail covered with hairs. A prominent facial feature is the black ring around either eye; the rings slightly extend toward the nose. The coat color varies geographically. The tail can thicken due to accumulation of fat; the diameter of the tail can reach 1 centimetre (0.39 in) where it is connected to the body. The head-and-body length is 11–13.7 centimetres (4.3–5.4 in); the hindfeet measure 1.7 centimetres (0.67 in), while ears measure 2.3 centimetres (0.91 in).

This opossum can exhibit torpor, a mechanism that allows the opossum to significantly reduce its food and energy requirements. This is similar to hibernation, except that it is only done for a short period of time. Additionally, when water is scarce, the urine tends to become very concentrated.

== Ecology and behavior ==
The elegant fat-tailed mouse opossum is crepuscular (active mainly around twilight). It lives in nests (abandoned by birds and rodents, or built by itself) in tree hollows, under rocks and roots. It is arboreal (tree-living) as well as terrestrial (land-living). The opossum feeds mainly on arthropods and larvae, along with fruits, small vertebrates and carrion. This opossum can use its prehensile tail, regardless of its thickness, to efficiently climb and grasp branches – an ability not as developed in other small Chilean mammals. Nests are generally occupied by one individual; in southern Chile, the home range of this opossum is 1,383 square metres (14,890 sq ft) large in July, and shrinks to 781 square metres (8,410 sq ft) in December. Predators of this opossum include the culpeo fox, burrowing owl and the great horned owl.

Both sexes mature by the first year. A female can have one to two litters in the annual breeding season, typically from September to March. Up to 17 embryos can be produced, but the number of survivors will depend on the number of nipples functioning (typically 11 to 13).

== Distribution and status ==
The elegant fat-tailed mouse opossum occurs in a variety of habitats – from cloud forests to chaparrals, up to an altitude of 2,500 metres (8,200 ft) above the sea level. It occurs to the west of the Andes in central Chile. The IUCN lists this opossum as least concern given its wide distribution and presumably large numbers, but deforestation and agricultural expansion have led to decline in populations in some parts of the range.
