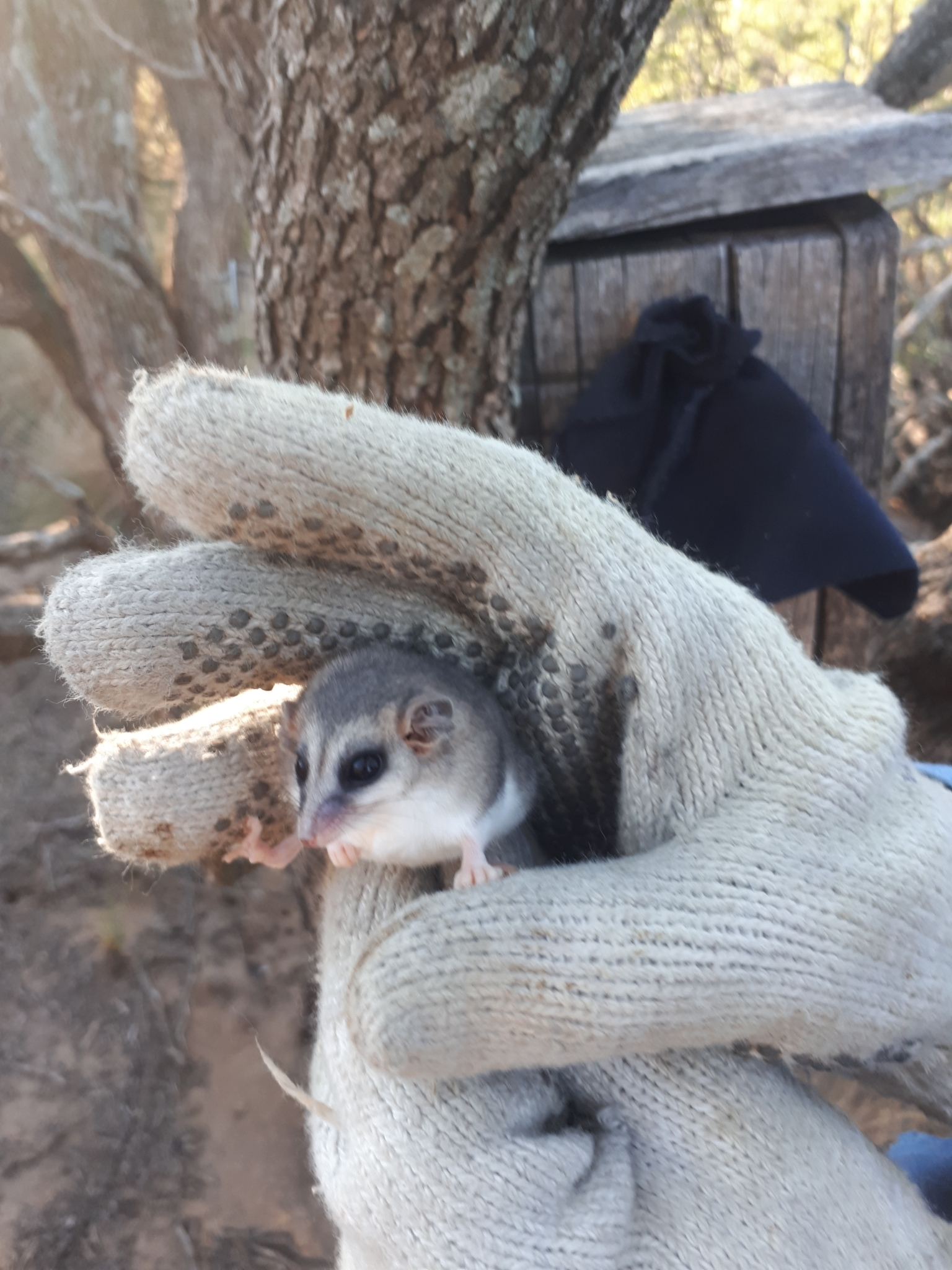

Conservation status
- Least Concern (IUCN 3.1)

Scientific classification
- Kingdom: Animalia
- Phylum: Chordata
- Class: Mammalia
- Infraclass: Marsupialia
- Order: Didelphimorphia
- Family: Didelphidae
- Genus: Thylamys
- Species: T. pallidior

Binomial name
- Thylamys pallidior (Thomas, 1902)
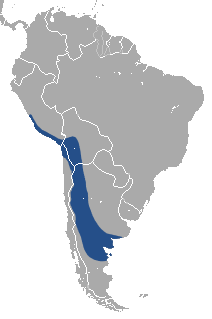
- White-bellied fat-tailed mouse opossum range

Synonyms
- List: Didelphys elegans pallidior Trouessart, 1905; Marmosa bruchi Thomas, 1921; M. elegans pallidior Thomas, 1902; M. pallidior Tate, 1933; M. pulchella Cabrera, 1958; M. pusilla bruchi Cabrera, 1958; M. pusilla pallidor Cabrera, 1958; Thylamys pusilla bruchi Cabrera, 1958; T. pusilla pallidor Cabrera, 1958

= White-bellied fat-tailed mouse opossum =

Species of marsupial

The white-bellied fat-tailed mouse opossum (Thylamys pallidior) is a species of opossum in the family Didelphidae. It is found in Argentina, Bolivia, Chile and Peru.

== Taxonomy and etymology ==
The white-bellied fat-tailed mouse opossum is a member of the genus Thylamys, and is placed in the family Didelphidae. It was first described by English zoologist Oldfield Thomas as Marmosa elegans pallidior in 1902. The present binomial name was suggested in a 1989 paper. No subspecies are recognized.

The cladogram below, based on a 2016 study, shows the phylogenetic relationships of the white-bellied fat-tailed mouse opossum.

- - - - Patagonian opossum (Lestodelphys halli)
      - Thylamys
        - - Dwarf fat-tailed mouse opossum (T. velutinus)
          - Karimi's fat-tailed mouse opossum (T. karimii)
        - - - Buff-bellied fat-tailed mouse opossum (T. venustus)
            - - Cinderella fat-tailed mouse opossum (T. cinderella)
              - Argentine fat-tailed mouse opossum (T. sponsorius)
          - - Paraguayan fat-tailed mouse opossum (T. macrurus)
            - - - - Tate's fat-tailed mouse opossum (T. tatei)
                  - - Elegant fat-tailed mouse opossum (T. elegans)
                    - White-bellied fat-tailed mouse opossum (T. pallidior)
                - - T. citellus
                  - - T. pulchellus
                    - Common fat-tailed mouse opossum (T. pusillus)

The generic name is composed of the Greek words thylas ("pouch") and mys ("mouse"), and the specific name pallidior derives from the Latin pallidus ("pale"). Alternative names for the white-bellied fat-tailed opossum include pallid fat-tailed opossum, comadreja enana, comadrejita comun, llaca de la puna and marmosa palada.

== Description ==
The white-bellied fat-tailed mouse opossum, one of the smallest in its genus, differs from most other mouse opossums in having a gray to brown coat and completely white underside. It has well-developed, blackish eye rings that extend toward the nose (similar to the buff-bellied, elegant and Tate's fat-tailed mouse opossums but unlike the common, dwarf, Karimi's and Paraguayan fat-tailed mouse opossums). The head-and-body length of the white-bellied fat-tailed mouse opossum is 7.3 to 10.5 centimetres (2.9 to 4.1 in); the tail, slightly longer, ranges from 9 to 11.5 centimetres (3.5 to 4.5 in). Adults weigh between 13 and 39 grams (0.46 and 1.38 oz).

The coat is smooth with gray and brown hairs, and notably darker along the midline of the back than the flanks. A gray band, seen in other mouse opossums, is absent or inconspicuous. The face is significantly paler than the coat, hence its name. The tail is prehensile, with only sparse hairs, albeit in a similar color to those on the body. The tail becomes noticeably thicker, especially at the base, during the autumn, when the animal lays down fat reserves in preparation for winter. The fur on the feet is white, and relatively dense about the ankles.

== Distribution and habitat ==
The white-bellied fat-tailed mouse opossum is found in southern Peru and south-western Bolivia, in the northernmost regions of Chile, and along the eastern slopes of the Andes mountains in western and central Argentina. It inhabits arid and semi-arid environments from sea level to 4,500 metres (14,800 ft), ranging from the coastal deserts of Peru, through the Andes and the Monte Desert, and into the Patagonian steppe of Argentina. It generally inhabits rocky environments with little plant cover, but can be found in dry forest or thorn scrub.

== Behavior ==
White-bellied fat-tailed mouse opossums are nocturnal animals with good climbing abilities, although they prefer to spend most of their time on the ground. They nest in natural cavities, either in trees or shrubs, or beneath rocks. Although they do not truly hibernate through the winter, they do enter torpor if temperatures fall below around 15 °C, and therefore may be inactive through much of the winter period.

In the wild, they rarely drink, being able to subsist on the water in their food. They eat a wide range of insects and spiders, but prefer beetles, of which they may eat up to twenty a night. Although such small invertebrates compose the majority of their diet, they also eat a moderate amount of leaves and seeds, and will occasionally consume small vertebrates such as mice and lizards. Their main predators include the barn owl and the Magellanic horned owl.

== Reproduction ==
White-bellied fat-tailed mouse opossums are believed to be able to breed up to three times a year, although most probably only give birth once or twice. The young are born in litters of up to fifteen individuals, typically during the summer months. Unlike some other marsupials, the females do not have a pouch; the teats are variable in both number and arrangement, and may not all be functional at the same time. Individuals have lived up to eighteen months in captivity.

== Evolution ==
It is closely related to T. karimii. However, phylogenetic analysis shows that the species' closest relatives are probably the elegant, common, and Tate's fat-tailed mouse opossums, all of which also inhabit arid environments. Although fossils are known only from the Holocene, estimates for the divergence of the species from its closest relatives range from 2.2 to 6 million years ago.
