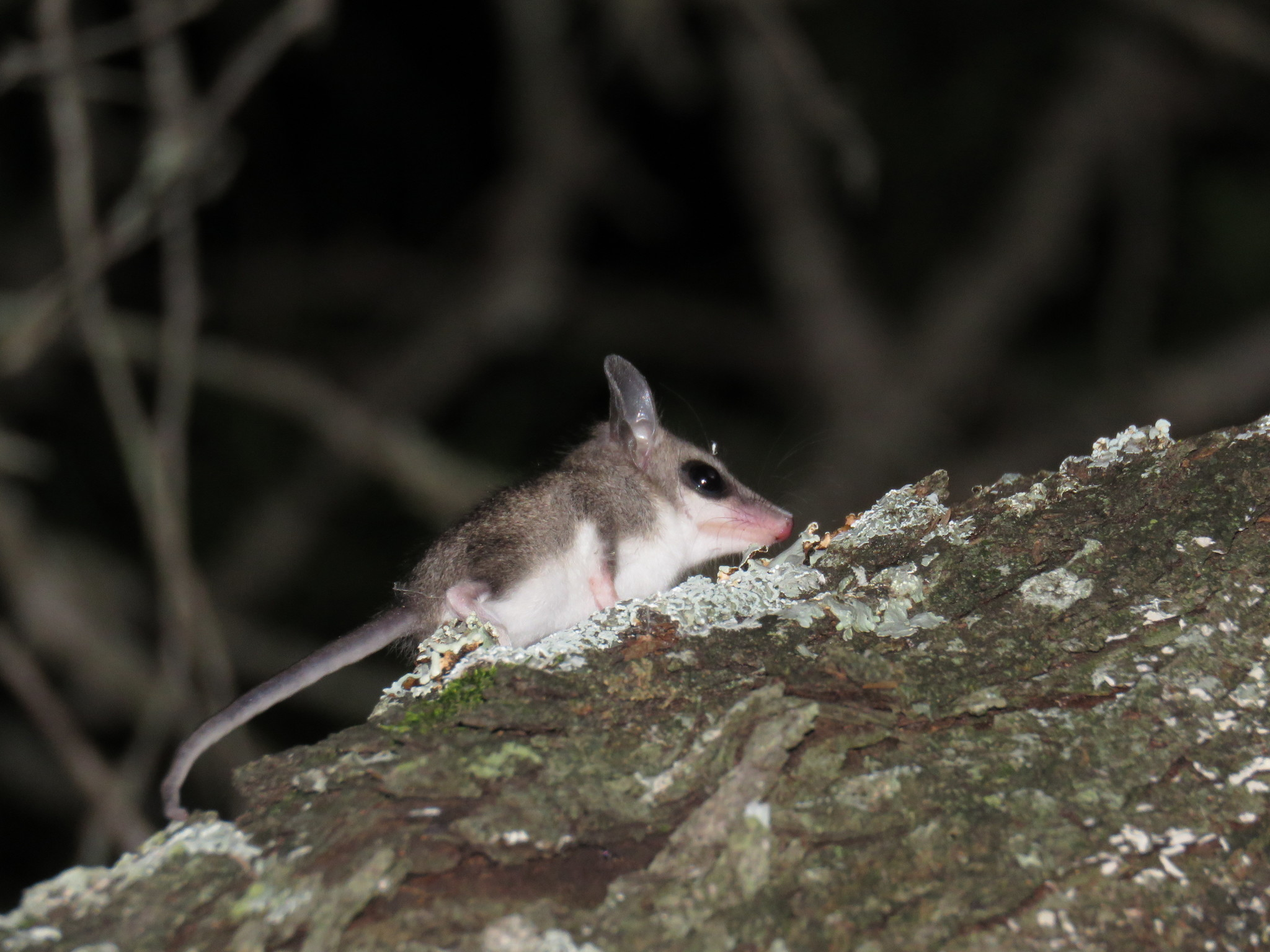

Conservation status
- Least Concern (IUCN 3.1)

Scientific classification
- Kingdom: Animalia
- Phylum: Chordata
- Class: Mammalia
- Infraclass: Marsupialia
- Order: Didelphimorphia
- Family: Didelphidae
- Genus: Thylamys
- Species: T. pulchellus

Binomial name
- Thylamys pulchellus (Cabrera, 1934)

= Dry Chaco fat-tailed opossum =

Species of rodent

The Dry Chaco fat-tailed opossum (Thylamys pulchellus) is a species of opossum in the subfamily Didelphinae. The species is endemic to the Argentine portion of Gran Chaco. The species was also once considered to be a part of the common fat-tailed mouse opossum (Thylamys pusillus) but is now considered a different species based on morphological and genetic differences.
