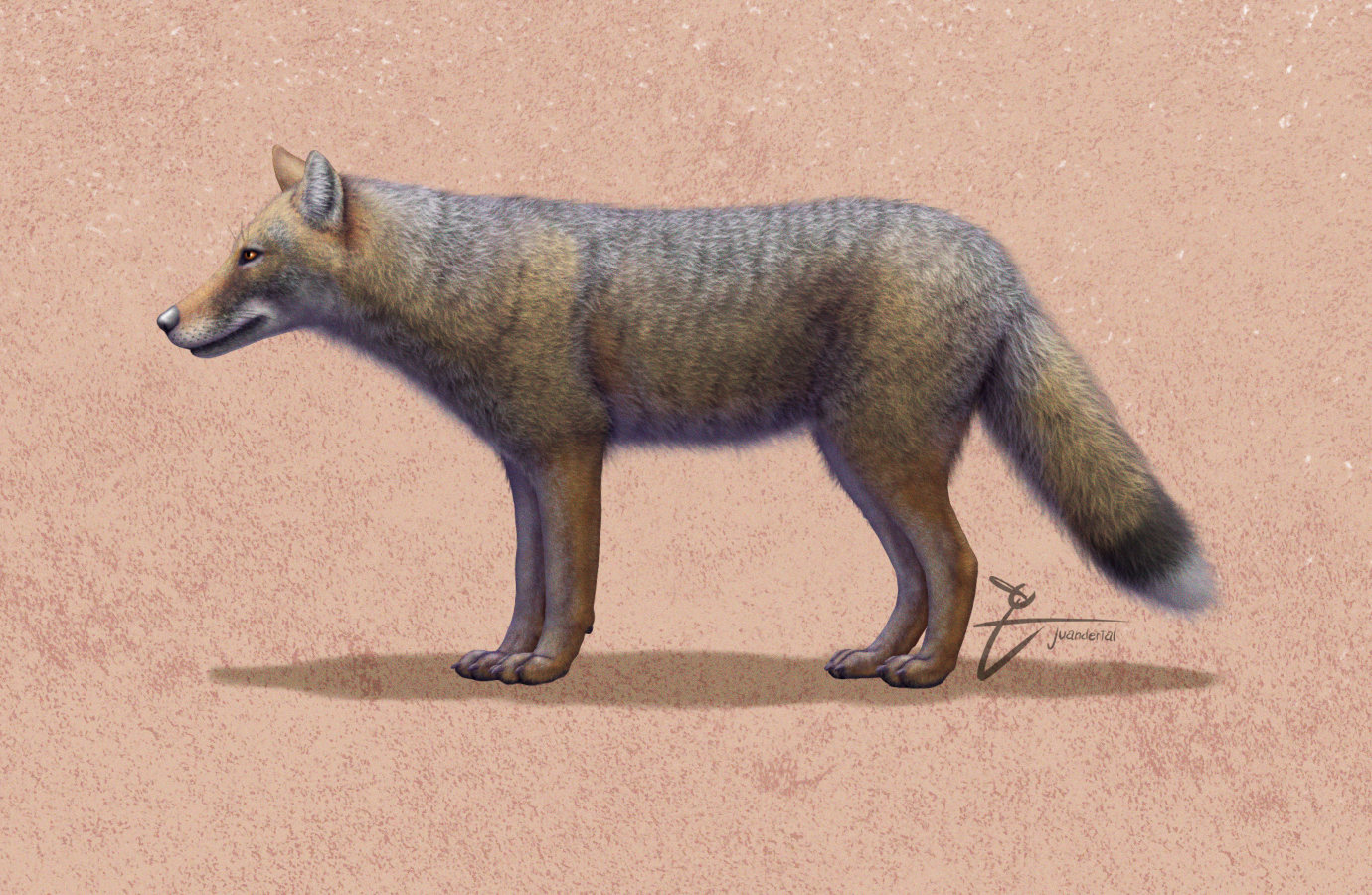
- Artistic reconstruction

Conservation status
- Extinct (1464–1636) (IUCN 3.1)

Scientific classification
- Kingdom: Animalia
- Phylum: Chordata
- Class: Mammalia
- Order: Carnivora
- Family: Canidae
- Genus: †Dusicyon
- Species: †D. avus

Binomial name
- †Dusicyon avus (Burmeister, 1866)
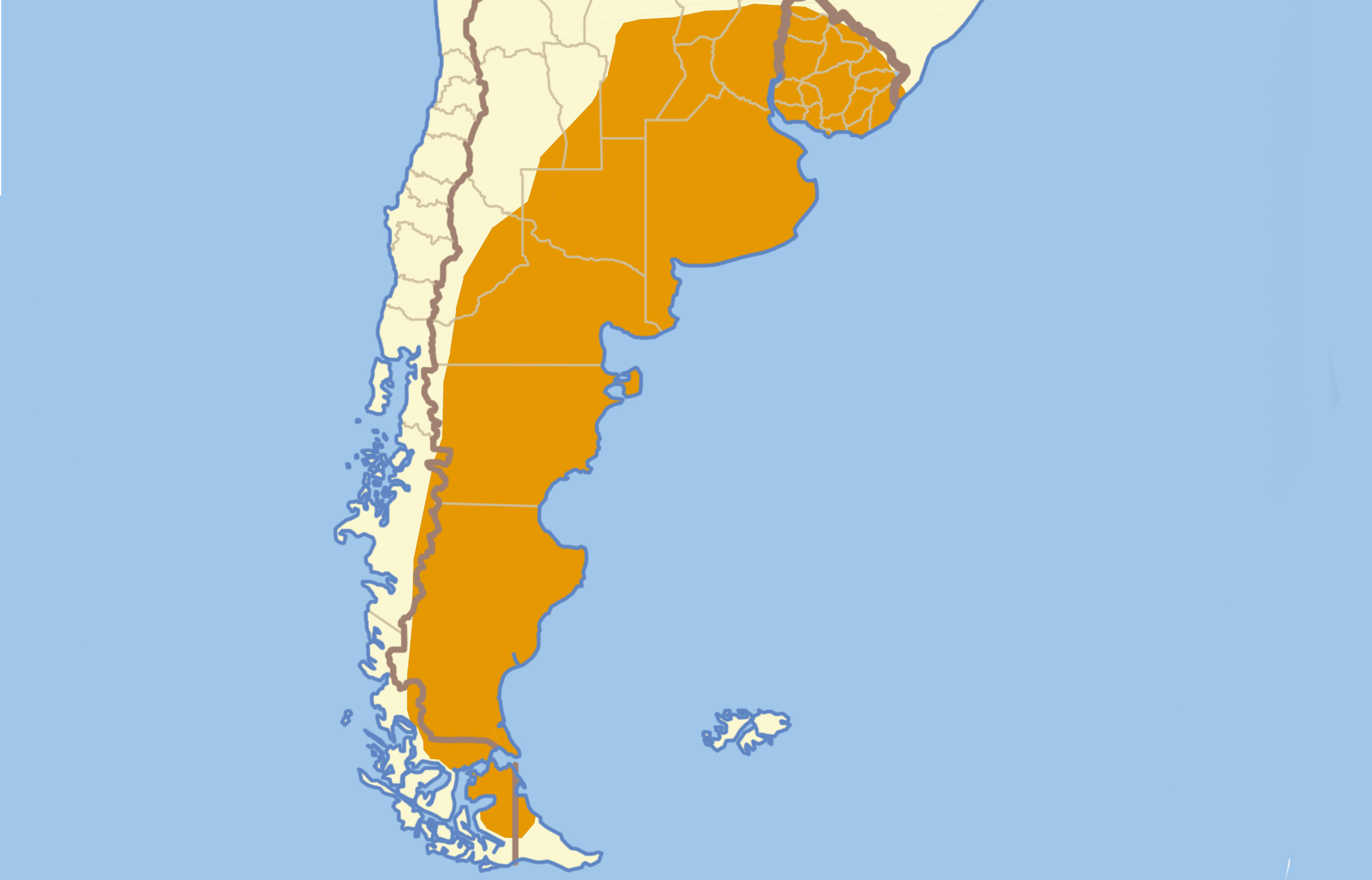
- Former range in amber

Synonyms
- Canis avus; Canis platensis Mercerat 1891

= Dusicyon avus =

Dusicyon avus Temporal range: ~0.78–0.0004 Ma Middle Pleistocene - Late Holocene

Extinct species of carnivore

Dusicyon avus is an extinct species of canid native to South America during the Pleistocene and Holocene epochs. It was medium to large, about the size of a German Shepherd. It was closely related to the Falkland Islands wolf (Dusicyon australis), which descended from a population of D. avus. It appears to have survived until very recently, perhaps 400 years ago.

Dusicyon avus was around the size of a coyote, and was morphologically similar to jackals, suggesting a niche similar to both.

== Taxonomy ==
In 1866, Hermann Burmeister described Dusicyon avus based on near-complete skull remains from Buenos Aires Province. These remains were sent to the National Historical Museum in Argentina.

British zoologist established the genus Dusicyon in 1914, which included the Falkland Islands wolf and other canids such as the culpeo and South American grey fox. Most of the canids were moved to the genus Lycalopex by Langguth in 1975.

== Range ==
Dusicyon avus range extended through the Pampas and Patagonia in the south-central and southern parts of South America, with an estimated range of around 762 351 km². Its fossils have been found in the Luján Formation of Argentina, the Chui Formation of Brazil, the Milodón Cave in Chile and the Sopas Formation of Uruguay.

== Diet and ecology ==
Its diet seems to have been more carnivorous than extant foxes based on δ^{13}C and δ^{15}N values, probably mostly preying on small mammals but also scavenging on large carcasses. This is in contrast to the warrah, whose diet was restricted to the seabirds and seal pups available on the Falkland Islands. Morphologically, D. avus and D. australis are most similar to jackals, suggesting a similar ecological niche.

== Relationship to humans ==
A grave of the late second millennium BCE at Loma de los Muertos in General Conesa, Río Negro Argentina contains a sub-adult D. avus, buried in a human mortuary context in a comparable manner to adjacent human burials. It may have been kept as a pet and been considered part of the human social group. Another example is found in Cañada Seca, Mendoza Argentina.

== Extinction ==
=== Dating of extinction ===
Dusicyon avus, according to earlier estimates, became extinct around 1000 BCE, with possibilities that it became extinct as recently as 500 – 300 years BP. Recent research confirms more recent dates, with the last appearance datum in the Pampean Region being 700 BP (1232–1397 AD) and southernmost Patagonia at 400 years BP (1454–1626 AD).

Charles Darwin in his 1839 book The Voyage of the Beagle stated that "many sealers, Gauchos, and Indians, who have visited these islands [the Falklands], all maintain that no such animal [the warrah] is found in any part of South America" suggesting that it was unlikely to have been alive at this time. It is possible, but as yet unproven, that some populations of D. avus may have persisted until the time of European contact. Forty years before the introduction of the South American gray fox to Tierra del Fuego, there are some ethnographic references to the existence of two species of foxes there. Around 1900, the indigenous Selkʼnam people were recorded as recognizing two varieties of foxes, one of which grew to unusual size. If the "big fox" was D. avus, this would indicate that it survived until the 19th century, at least in this location. In 1871 George Musters wrote a description of encountering a fox in Patagonia similar to a warrah, which may have been an account of this species.

=== Reasons for extinction ===
The extinction of D. avus as opposed to the naive D. australis is mysterious, as there is no clear reason why a generalised medium sized canid would go extinct, especially at such a late date after the Quaternary extinction event. There is no compelling evidence that climatic change was the cause of the extinction, nor any evidence that hybridisation with domestic dogs was the cause, as the skull morphology and DNA is consistent from the Late Pleistocene through the Holocene. Dusicyon was used for ritual purposes by aboriginal peoples in the Late Holocene, and appears to have a high symbolic value and its remains, usually teeth, are found in many archaeological sites. D. avus, despite its wide range, has a low genetic diversity in tested samples, suggesting a possible low population or genetic bottleneck before extinction. It is likely that a combination of both climatic and anthropogenic factors was the cause of their demise.

== See also ==
- Fuegian dog
