= Thylamys citellus =

Conservation status
- Least Concern (IUCN 3.1)

Scientific classification
- Kingdom: Animalia
- Phylum: Chordata
- Class: Mammalia
- Infraclass: Marsupialia
- Order: Didelphimorphia
- Family: Didelphidae
- Genus: Thylamys
- Species: T. citellus

Binomial name
- Thylamys citellus (Thomas, 1912)

Synonyms
- Marmosa citella Thomas, 1912

Species of marsupial

Thylamys citellus, commonly known as the Mesopotamian fat-tailed opossum (or comadreja litoraleña in Spanish), is a small, nocturnal marsupial belonging to the family Didelphidae. Native to the Mesopotamian region of South America, this species was historically grouped as a subspecies or synonym of the common fat-tailed mouse opossum (Thylamys pusillus), but genetic and morphological revisions have firmly established it as its own distinct, monotypic species.
