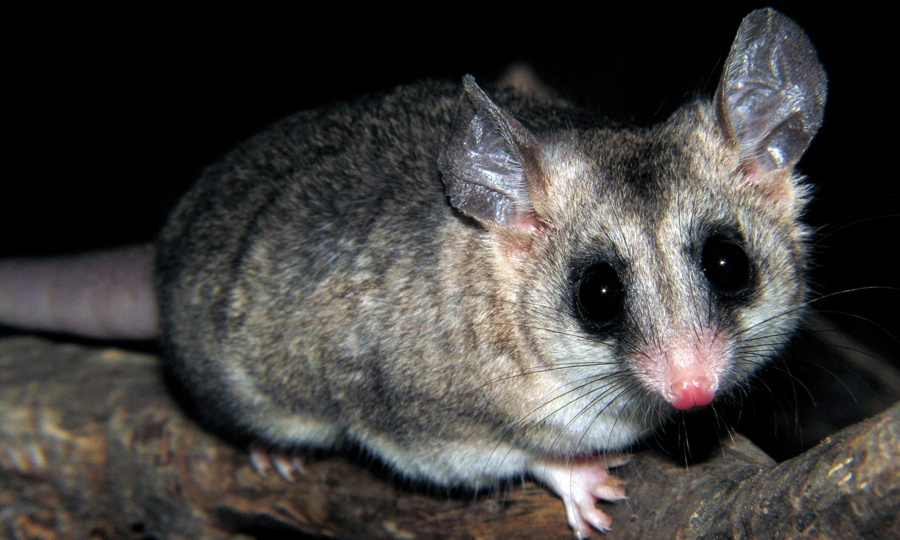
- Elegant fat-tailed mouse opossum

Scientific classification
- Kingdom: Animalia
- Phylum: Chordata
- Class: Mammalia
- Infraclass: Marsupialia
- Order: Didelphimorphia
- Family: Didelphidae
- Subfamily: Didelphinae
- Tribe: Thylamyini
- Genus: Thylamys; J. E. Gray, 1843

Type species
- Didelphis elegans Waterhouse 1839

Species
- See text

= Thylamys =

Thylamys Temporal range: Mid Miocene (Colloncuran) to Recent ~14–0 Ma

Genus of marsupials

Thylamys is a genus of opossums in the family Didelphidae. The premaxillae are rounded rather than pointed. The females lack a pouch. The females' nipples are arranged in two symmetrical rows on the abdomen. All species but T. macrurus store fat in their tails, although this is not necessarily true for all species in the genus. Fossils belonging to the genus date back to the Miocene, with the oldest specimens being found in the Cerro Azul Formation of Argentina and the Honda Group of Colombia. Genetic studies indicate that the genus may have originated around 14 million years ago.

== Taxonomy ==
Cladogram of living Thylamys species.

- - - T. karimii (Petter 1968) Reig, Kirsch & Marshall 1987 (Karimi's fat-tailed mouse opossum)
    - T. velutinus (Wagner 1842) Miranda-Ribeiro 1936 (Dwarf fat-tailed mouse opossum)
  - - - T. tatei (Handley 1957) Reig, Kirsch & Marshall 1987 (Tate's fat-tailed mouse opossum)
      - - T. elegans (Waterhouse 1839) Gray 1843b (Elegant fat-tailed mouse opossum)
        - T. pallidior (Thomas 1902) Gardner & Creighton 1989 (White-bellied fat-tailed mouse opossum)
    - - - T. citellus (Thomas 1912)
        - - T. pulchellus (Cabrera 1934) (Dry Chaco fat-tailed opossum)
          - T. pusillus (Desmarest 1804) Reig, Kirsch & Marshall 1987 (Common fat-tailed mouse opossum)
      - - T. macrurus (Olfers 1818) Gardner & Creighton 1989 (Paraguayan fat-tailed mouse opossum)
        - - T. venustus Thomas 1902 (Buff-bellied fat-tailed mouse opossum)
          - - T. cinderella (Thomas 1902) Flores, Díaz & Barquez 2000 (Cinderella fat-tailed mouse opossum)
            - T. sponsorius (Thomas 1921) Flores, Díaz & Barquez 2000 (Argentine fat-tailed mouse opossum)

Other species of Thylamys.

- †T. colombianus Goin 1997
- T. fenestrae (Marelli 1932)
- †T. minutus Goin 1997
- †T. pinei Goin, Montalvo & Visconti 2000
- †T. zettii Goin 1997
