= Fuegian dog =

Extinct domesticated canid

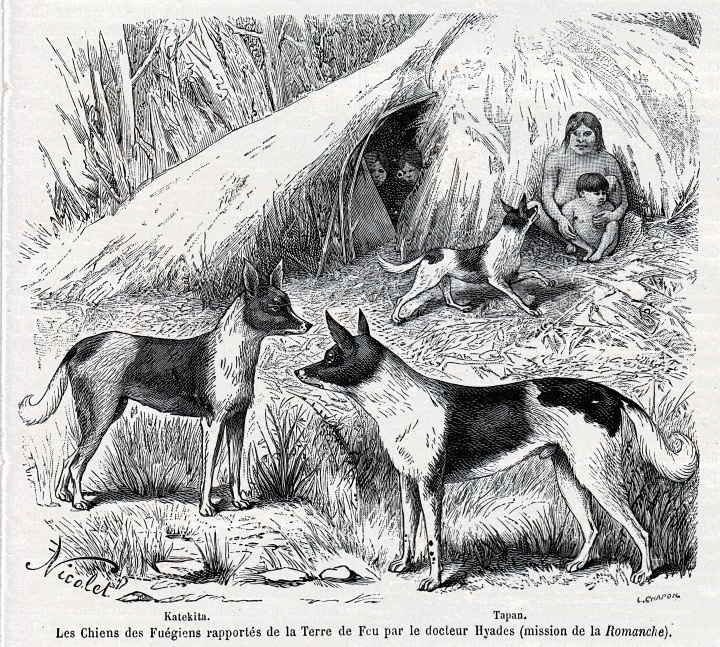
Two Fuegian dogs: Katekita (female) and Tapan (male)

The Fuegian dog, or Yahgan dog, or Patagonian dog (Spanish: perro fueguino, perro yagán, perro patagónico; Ona: wuisn) is an extinct type of canine. The Fuegian dog was bred and domesticated from the South American culpeo (Lycalopex culpaeus).

There are very few remaining museum specimens or examples of the Fuegian dog; one is at the Museo Salesiano Maggiorino Borgatello in Chile, and another is at the Fagnano Regional Museum in Tierra del Fuego, Argentina.

== Taxonomy ==
Romina Petrigh and Martín Fugassa conducted a genetic investigation in 2013 using hair samples from taxidermized specimens of Fuegian dogs, belonging to a collection of the Fagnano Regional Museum, in Rio Grande. The DNA from the hair samples was compared with that of various canids that inhabit Patagonia, such as the culpeo (Lycalopex culpaeus), the South American gray fox (Lycalopex griseus) and the Pampas fox (Lycalopex gymnocercus), and with that of domestic dogs (Canis lupus familiaris). This analysis showed a greater similarity between the Fuegian dog and the culpeo (97.57%), than with the domestic dog (88.93%). These results were supported by molecular phylogenetic analysis, suggesting an atypical domestication of culpeos by hunter-gatherers inhabiting Patagonia. This evidence is used by William L. Franklin to argue, in part, that the Fuegian dog "was not truly domesticated in the classical, domestic dog sense, but only partially as an intermediate between domestic and wild—strongly favouring the latter."

The culpeo itself is similar (in form and stature) to true foxes (tribe Vulpini), though it is closer, genetically, to wolves, coyotes and jackals (true canids, tribe Canini); thus it is placed in a separate genus within the South American foxes or zorros.

In a review of historical accounts and the current scientific literature, by Fabián Jaksic and Sergio Castro in 2023, they argued that the Fuegian dog was in fact two different animals, which they labelled as the Fuegian dog and the Patagonian dog. In their analysis, the Patagonian dog, used by the Selkʼnam, Aonikenk, and Manekʼenk peoples, was a domesticated breed descended from the culpeo, whereas the Fuegian dog, used by the Chonos, Kawesqar, and Yahgan peoples, was descended from an ancestral domestic dog population brought across the Bering Strait. Franklin argued that there is a lack of archaeological evidence for domesticated dogs being brought to Tierra del Fuego by ancestral Fuegians.

Others have posited the possibility of the Fuegian dog being domesticated from the now-extinct Dusicyon avus, or a potential hybrid of domestic dogs with either the culpeo or Dusicyon avus.

== Characteristics ==
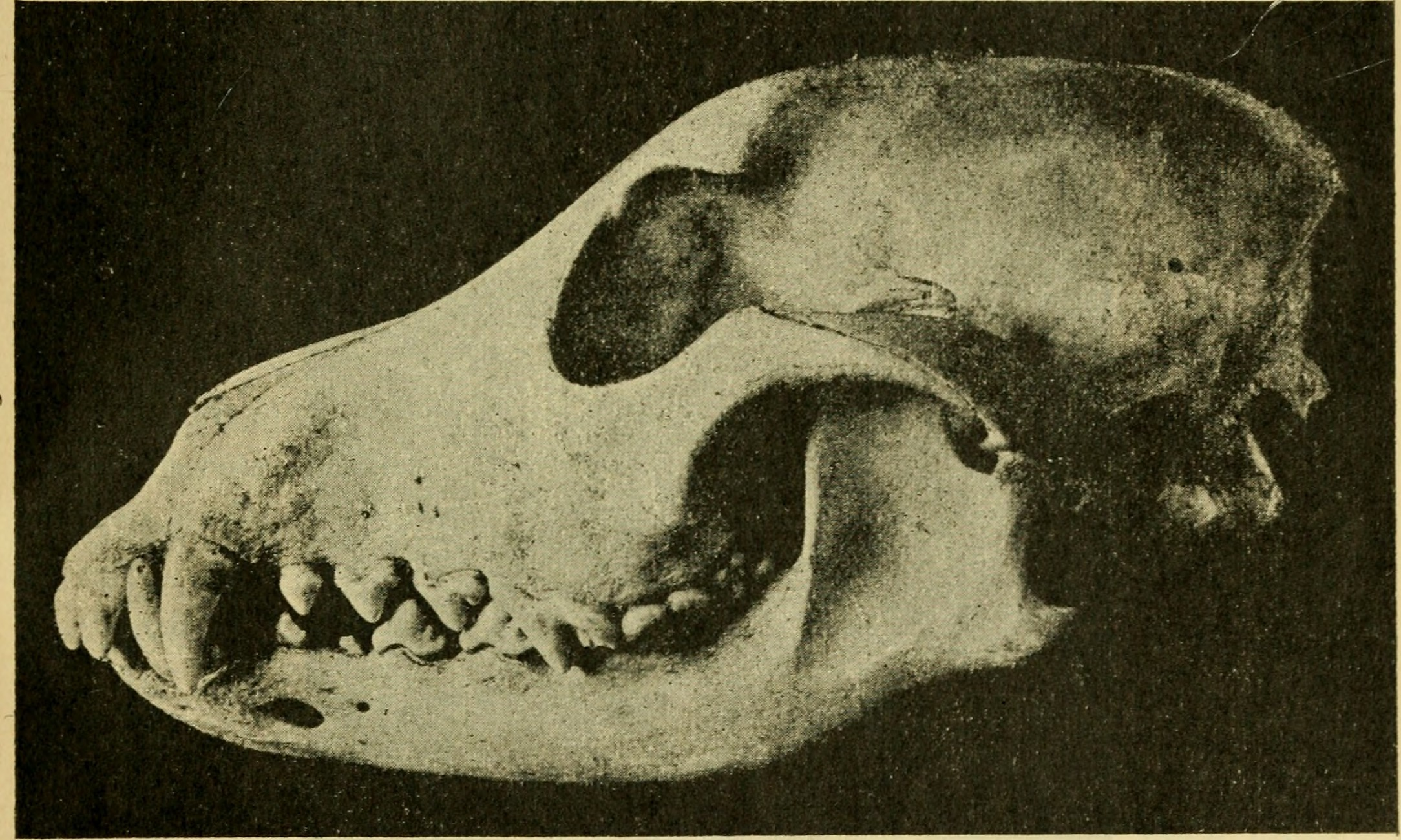
Skull of a Fuegian dog, photographed c. 1910s, and published in the journal Arkiv för Zoologi

Fuegian dogs had erect ears, sharp snout, longer straight fur, and a thick tail and were tawny-colored or entirely white. Surviving images show them to be a similar size to the wild culpeo, which weighs 5 to 13.5 kg (11 to 30 lb), or roughly the size of a Shetland Sheepdog. Samuel Kirkland Lothrop reported that their height ranged from 11 to 20 inches, while Ricardo E. Latcham reported them as being over 60 to 23.6 cm (23.6 to 9.3 in). Gauchos called these foxes "maned dogs" because of their resemblance to the maned wolf. Lucas Bridges described the animals as like "a stunted cross between an Alsatian police dog and a wolf".

It was described by French navigator Louis-Ferdinand Martial, who headed the 1883 scientific expedition to Cape Horn, as "ugly, with long tawny hair and a sharp snout, it looks quite like a fox".

In line with Jaksic and Castro's delineation into two separate animals, observations of Europeans described a smaller lighter colored dog that were employed in hunting tuco-tucos, and a larger darker colored dog that was employed in hunting guanacos.

== Behaviour ==
Although the distribution of the Fuegian dog corresponded with that of the Yahgan people, individual animals may not have been protective of their human owners. Julius Popper, one of the primary perpetrators of the genocide against the local indigenous population, wrote that: "I never saw them, no matter how large their number, take an aggressive attitude or defend their masters when these were in danger".

== Uses ==
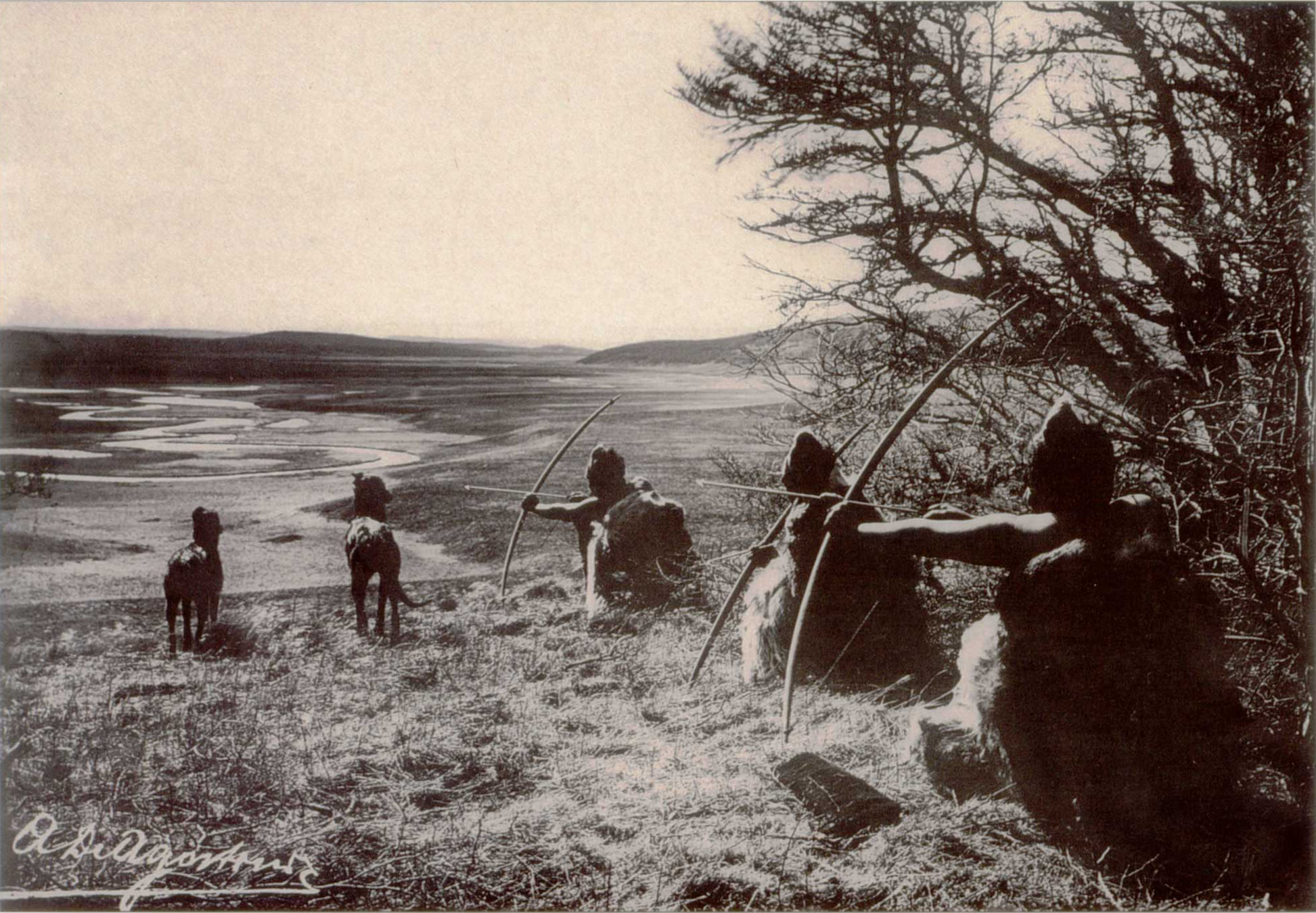
Selkʼnam hunting together with Fuegian dogs

While Julius Popper did not observe the dogs being of use in hunts, Antonio Coiazzi did record their use in hunting and this has been supported by later research. Darwin commented in his 1839 work The Voyage of the Beagle that he had been told by a native child that they caught otters for them. This was later supported by Martial's reporting.

All sources agree that the dogs also provided a source of warmth in shelters as they would arrange themselves to sleep tightly against and around the Selkʼnam. This was noted by Julius Popper stating: "The dogs placed themselves in a group around the small Onas, taking the shape of a kind of wrapping .... [M]y opinion is that the Fuegian dogs are only useful to complete the defective garment of the Indian, or better, as the Ona's heating furniture".

== Extermination ==
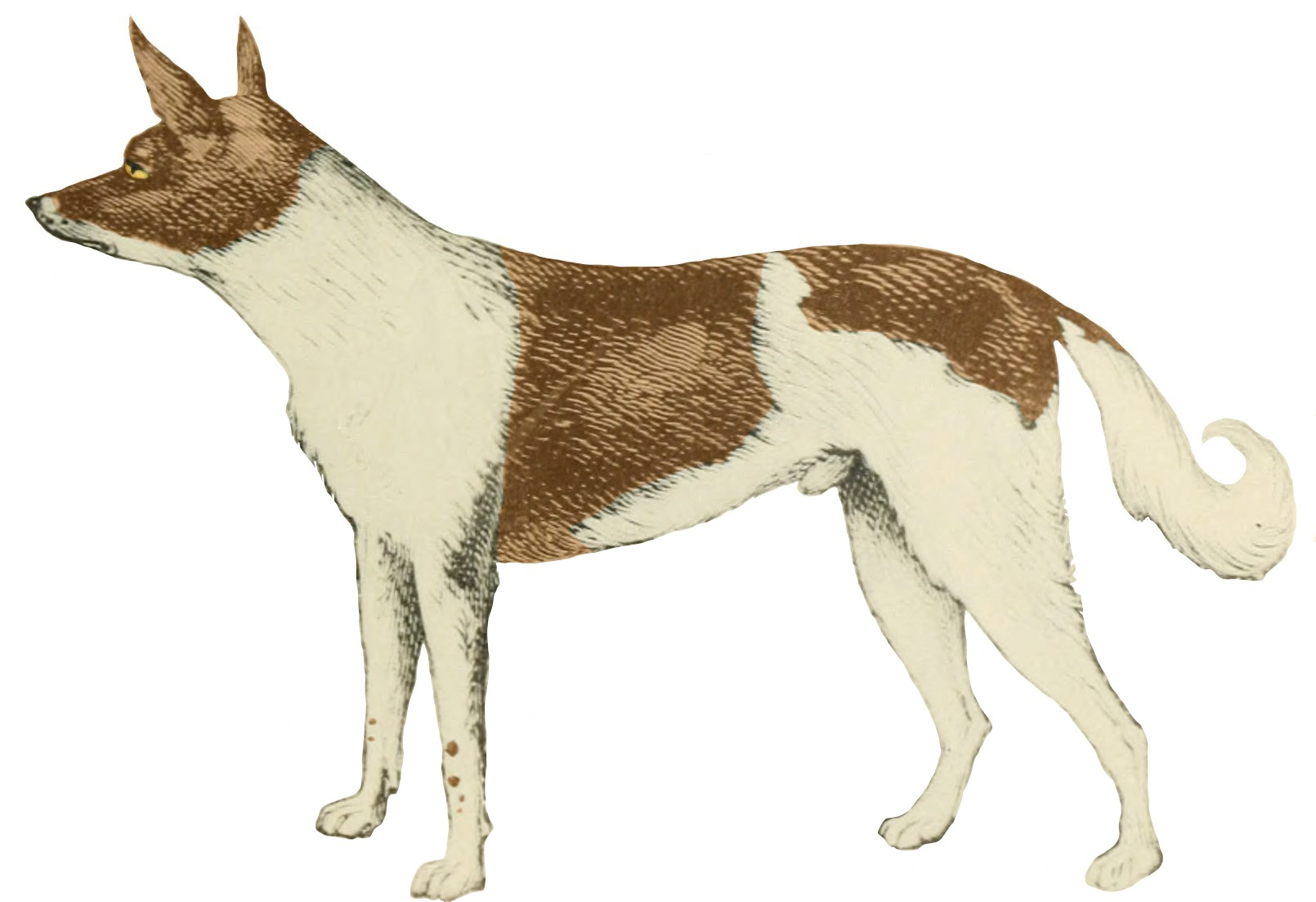
Colorized sketch of Tapan, by Philippe Alexandre Jules Künckel d'Herculais (1884)

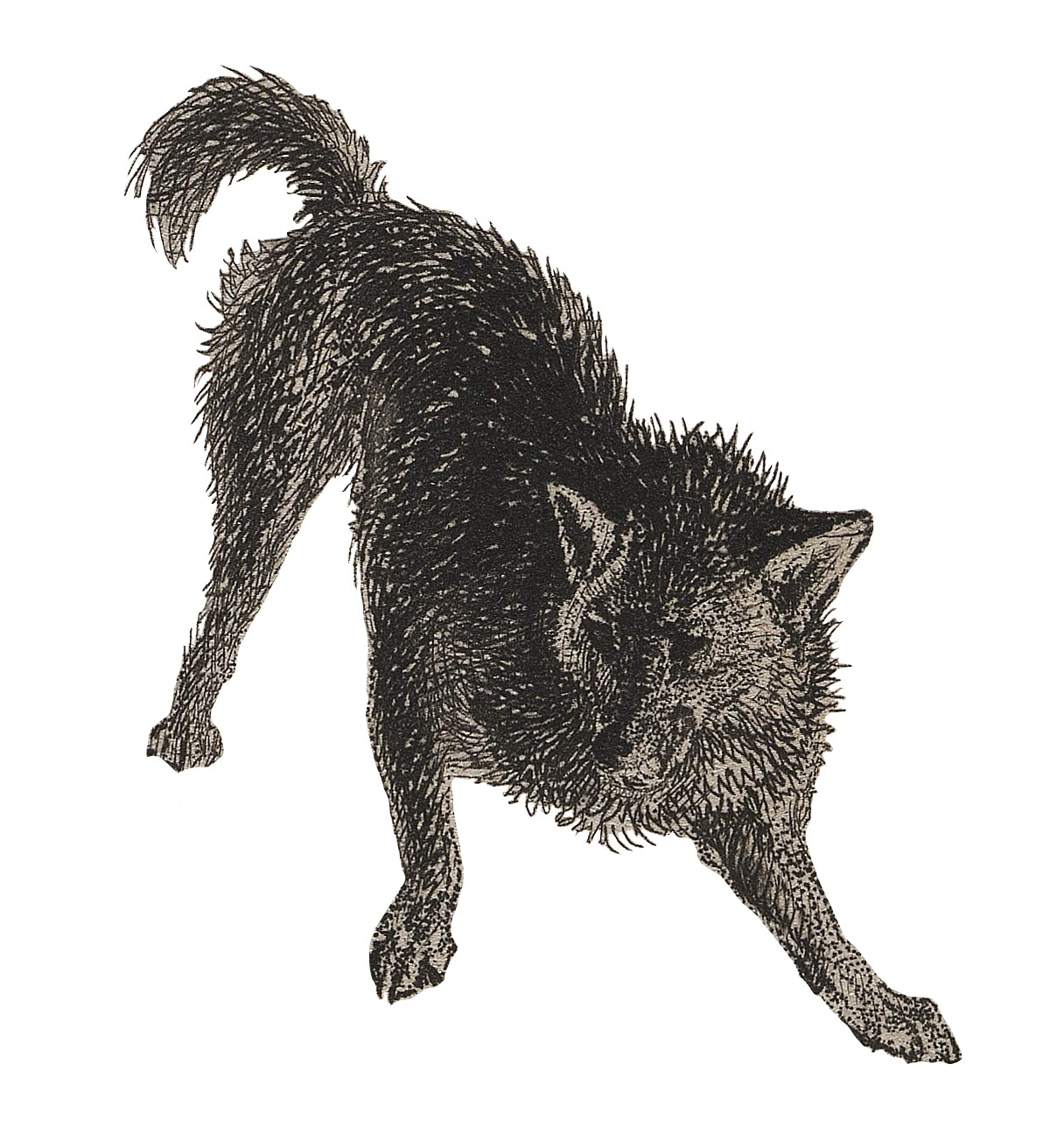
One artist's interpretation of a Fuegian dog

In 1919, when Silesian missionary Martin Gusinde visited the local Yahgans, he noticed that, to his knowledge, all of the dogs seemed to be missing. He immediately noted this as odd, especially considering that the tie between the dogs and the local people was well documented by foreign missionaries and explorers by this time. Indeed, this mutual cooperation allowed for the region to become the only stronghold of this unusual domesticated canine to have ever existed. Upon speaking to the local people and inquiring about what had happened to the animals, he was told that the entire known population of them had been exterminated, and it was claimed they "were dangerous to men and cattle". Apparently, this "fierce" nature of the animal was allegedly witnessed by Thomas Bridges in the 1880s, who in his writings, purported that the dogs attacked his mission's goats, while giving few specific details.

As part of the campaign of the Selknam genocide, the dogs were hunted by European settlers due to its use in hunting and home making among the Selkʼnam. This was the main cause of their extinction.

== See also ==
- Domesticated silver fox
- Falkland Islands wolf
