= Dusicyon cultridens =

Dusicyon cultridens Temporal range: Late Pliocene (Uquian) ~2.8–2.6 Ma

Scientific classification
- Kingdom: Animalia
- Phylum: Chordata
- Class: Mammalia
- Order: Carnivora
- Family: Canidae
- Genus: †Dusicyon
- Species: †D. cultridens

Binomial name
- †Dusicyon cultridens (Gervais & Ameghino 1880)

Synonyms
- Canis cultridens Gervais & Ameghino 1880

Extinct species of carnivore

Dusicyon cultridens or Dusicyon patagonicus cultridens is an extinct canid species in the genus Dusicyon. However, the classification of this species is poorly researched and debatable. Some scientists place this species in the genera Canis and Lycalopex.

== Distribution ==
Dusicyon cultridens is only known from fossil remains in Argentina. It lived in the Late Pliocene (Uquian in the SALMA classification), from approximately 2.8 to 2.6 million years ago. It was around at about the same time as the rodent Akodon lorenzinii. The fossils were found at cliffs near the Atlantic Ocean, in what is now the coastline of the province of Buenos Aires.

== Habitat and characteristics ==
Dusicyon cultridens lived in the South American temperate grasslands (pampas). Its size was between that of existing species such as the pampas fox and South American gray fox.
