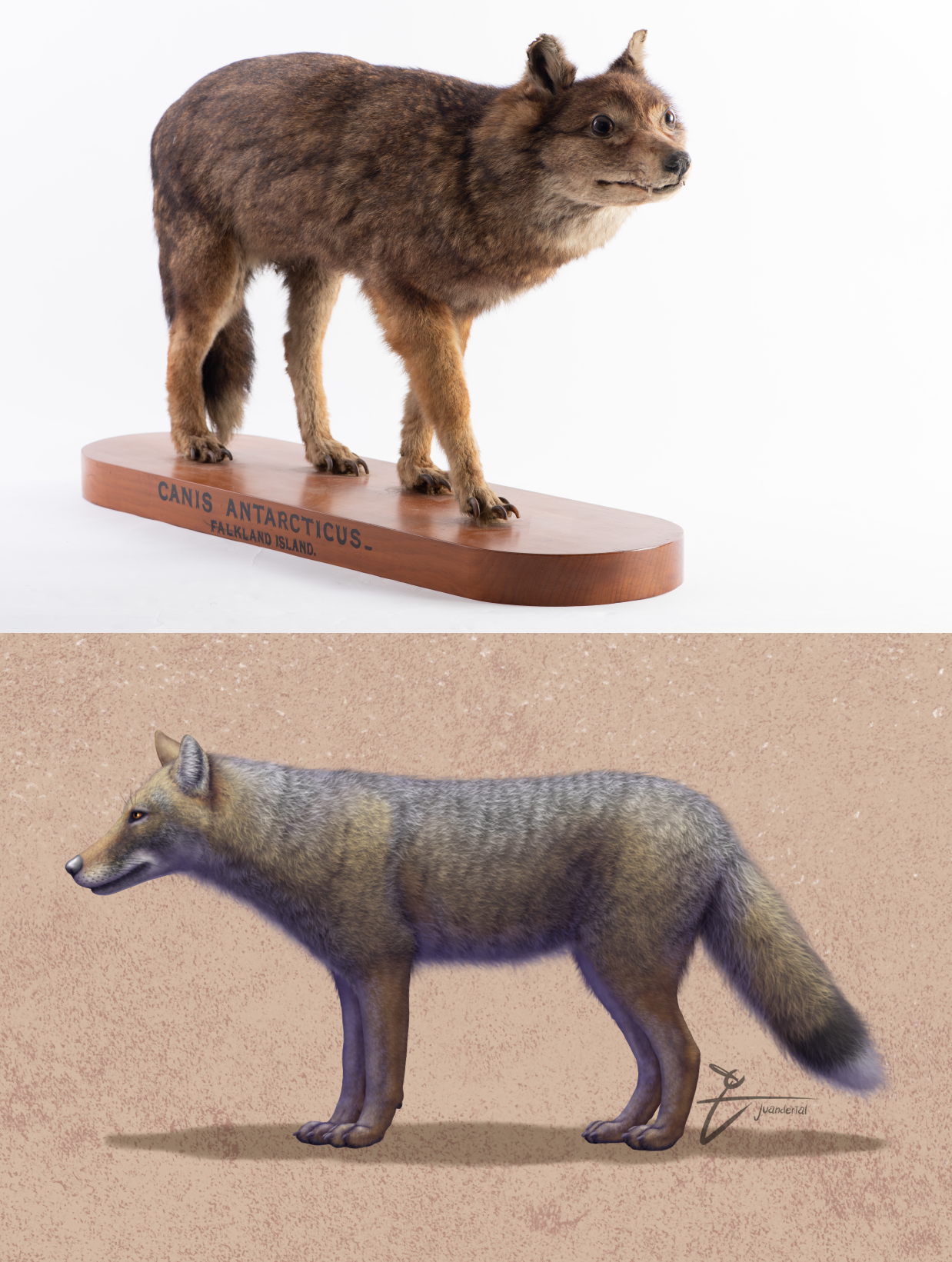
- Falkland Islands wolf and D. avus

Scientific classification
- Kingdom: Animalia
- Phylum: Chordata
- Class: Mammalia
- Infraclass: Placentalia
- Order: Carnivora
- Suborder: Caniformia
- Family: Canidae
- Tribe: Canini
- Subtribe: Cerdocyonina
- Genus: †Dusicyon; C. E. H. Smith, 1839

Type species
- Canis australis Kerr, 1792

Species
- Dusicyon australis; Dusicyon avus; Dusicyon cultridens
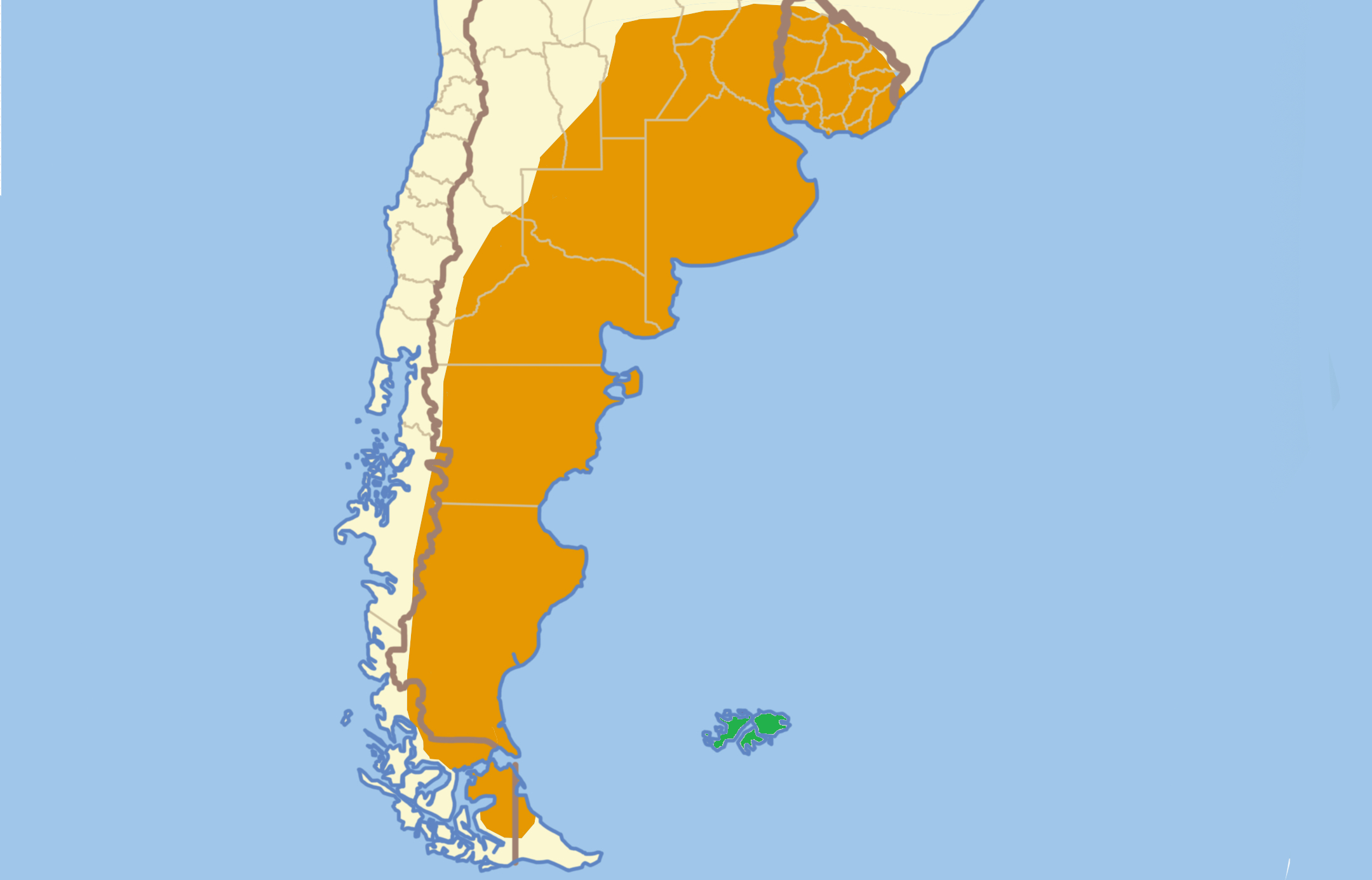
- Dusicyon distribution D. avus in orange, D. australis in green

= Dusicyon =

Dusicyon Temporal range: 2.8–0.0002 Ma Late Pliocene - Late Holocene

Extinct genus of carnivores

Dusicyon is an extinct genus of South American canids.

== Taxonomy ==
The type species is Dusicyon australis, the Falkland Islands wolf. In 1914, Oldfield Thomas established this genus, in which he included the culpeo and other South American foxes. These other canids were removed to Lycalopex by Langguth in 1975.

== Extinctions ==
Dusicyon avus, widely distributed in the late Pleistocene from Uruguay through Buenos Aires Province to southernmost Chile, is the closest known relative of the Falkland Islands wolf; the two lineages split only about 16,000 years ago. It died out in the late Holocene, earlier estimates suggested about 2,980 years ago on the island of Tierra del Fuego and almost 1,700 years ago in the continent. More recent research confirms much later extinction dates, with the latest confirmed records in the Pampean Region being 700 BP (1232–1397 AD) and southernmost Patagonia at 400 years BP (1454–1626 AD).
