= Tate's fat-tailed mouse opossum =

Conservation status
- Data Deficient (IUCN 3.1)

Scientific classification
- Kingdom: Animalia
- Phylum: Chordata
- Class: Mammalia
- Infraclass: Marsupialia
- Order: Didelphimorphia
- Family: Didelphidae
- Genus: Thylamys
- Species: T. tatei

Binomial name
- Thylamys tatei Handley, 1957
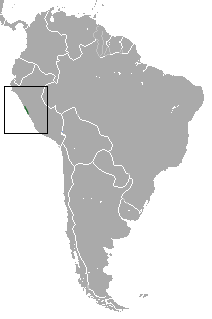
- Tate's fat-tailed mouse opossum range

Species of marsupial

Tate's fat-tailed mouse opossum (Thylamys tatei) is a species of opossum in the family Didelphidae, named after American zoologist George Henry Hamilton Tate. It is found at elevations of 300 to 3,000 m along the coast of central Peru. The species has the northernmost range of any member of its genus. It has white ventral fur and short condylobasal and zygomatic lengths. T. pallidior is very similar.
