= Cinderella fat-tailed mouse opossum =

Conservation status
- Least Concern (IUCN 3.1)

Scientific classification
- Kingdom: Animalia
- Phylum: Chordata
- Class: Mammalia
- Infraclass: Marsupialia
- Order: Didelphimorphia
- Family: Didelphidae
- Genus: Thylamys
- Species: T. cinderella

Binomial name
- Thylamys cinderella Thomas, 1902
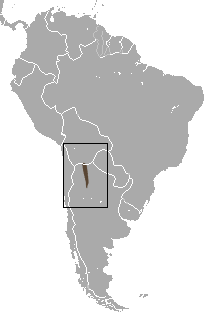
- Cinderella fat-tailed mouse opossum range

Species of marsupial

The Cinderella fat-tailed mouse opossum (Thylamys cinderella) is a species of opossum in the family Didelphidae. It is found in northern Argentina and southern Bolivia, in the eastern foothills of the Andes. Its dorsal fur is gray brown to dark brown. Its ventral fur is gray-based, except for the white to yellowish chest hairs.

== Argentine fat-tailed mouse opossum ==
The Argentine fat-tailed mouse opossum (Thylamys sponsorius) was formerly considered a species of opossum in the family Didelphidae. However, mitochondrial DNA sequence analysis does not support separate species status from T. cinderella.

It is found in the eastern foothills of the Andes in northern Argentina and southern Bolivia. Typically reach around 10-13 cm (4-5 inches) in body length, with a bushy tail adding another 12-15 cm (5-6 inches). Its dorsal fur is gray brown to dark brown. Its ventral fur is gray-based except for the white to yellowish chest hairs. It has been distinguished from T. cinderella by its well-developed postorbital ridges in both juveniles and adults that extend laterally behind the eye sockets. Only adults of T. sponsorius have fully developed postorbital ridges, and these do not extend laterally behind the eye sockets. While the American Society of Mammalogists maintains this as a distinct species, mitochondrial DNA sequence analysis does not support the population being distinct from T. cinderella.

== See also ==
Cinderella shrew (Crocidura cinderella)
