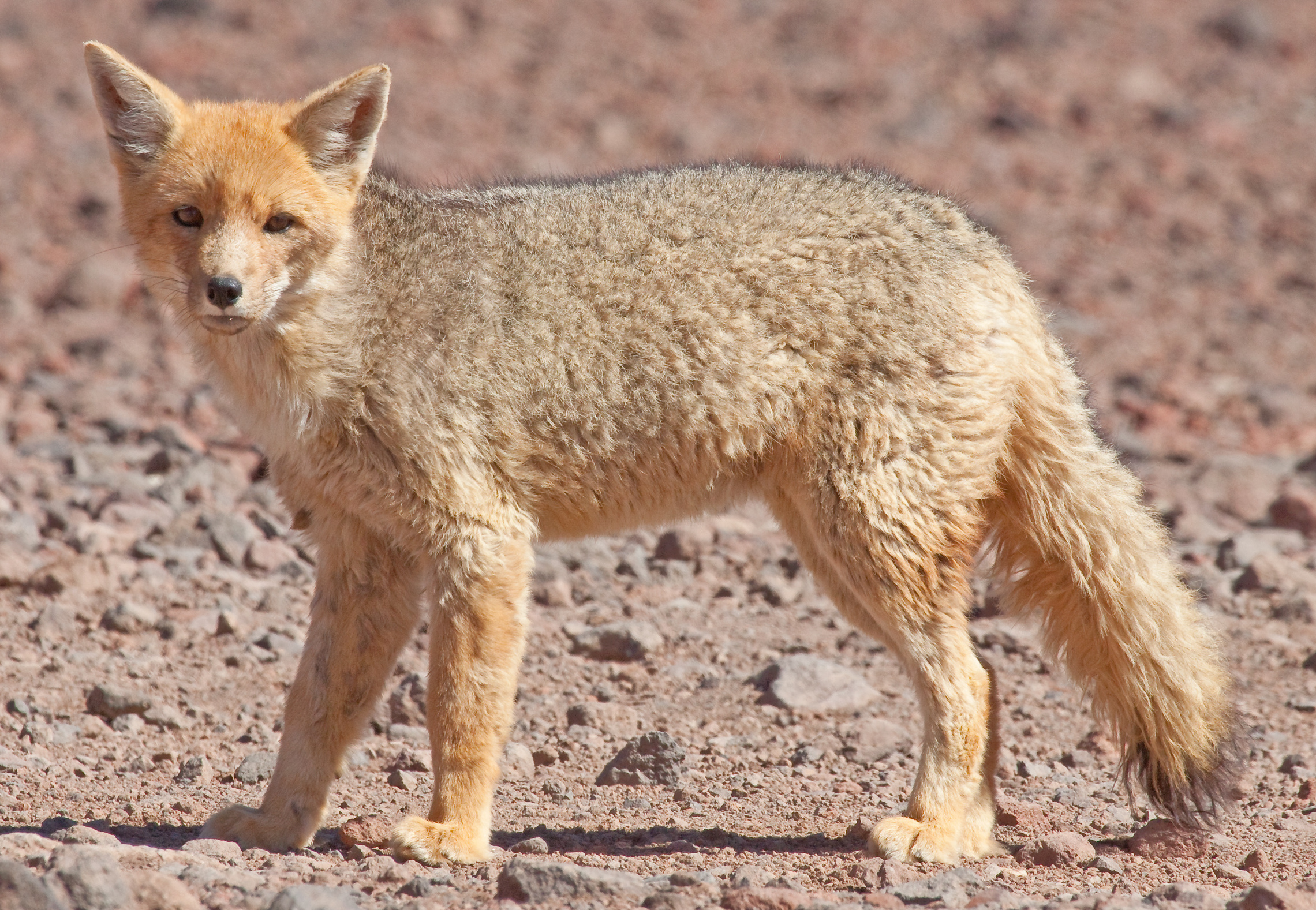
- Culpeo in the Andes of Bolivia

Conservation status
- Least Concern (IUCN 3.1)
- CITES Appendix II

Scientific classification
- Kingdom: Animalia
- Phylum: Chordata
- Class: Mammalia
- Order: Carnivora
- Family: Canidae
- Genus: Lycalopex
- Species: L. culpaeus

Binomial name
- Lycalopex culpaeus (Molina, 1782)
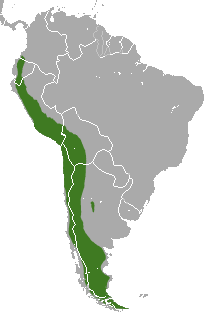
- Culpeo range

= Culpeo =

Species of carnivore

The culpeo (Lycalopex culpaeus), also known as Culpeo zorro, Andean zorro, Andean fox, Paramo wolf, Andean wolf, and colpeo fox, is a species of South American fox. Despite the name, it is not in the Vulpes, but more closely related to wolves and jackals. Its appearance resembles that of foxes due to convergent evolution.

The culpeo's diet consists largely of rodents, rabbits, birds and lizards, and to a lesser extent, plant material and carrion. They may prey on Andean flamingos and baby vicuña. The culpeo sometimes attacks farm animals, among them sheep, goats and poultry; for this, it is hunted in rural Chile and Argentina. In some regions, it has become rare, but overall the species is not threatened with extinction.

The culpeo was domesticated by the Selkʼnam people of Tierra del Fuego, producing the Fuegian dog which became extinct in the late 19th or early 20th century.

== Description ==
Culpeo skull

The culpeo is a canid intermediate in size between a red fox and a coyote. It is the second-largest native canid on the continent after the maned wolf. In appearance, it bears many similarities to the widely recognized red fox. It has grey and reddish fur, a white chin, reddish legs and a stripe on its back that may be barely visible. The average weight of the male is 11.4 kg (25 lb), while the typically smaller females average 8.4 kg (19 lb). Overall, a weight range of 5 to 13.5 kg (11 to 30 lb) has been reported. Total length can range from 94 to 133 cm (37 to 52 in), including a tail of 32 to 44 cm (13 to 17 in) in length. The pelt has a grizzled appearance. The neck and shoulders are often tawny to rufous in color, while the upper back is dark. The bushy tail has a black tip.

== Range ==
The culpeo's range extends from the southern regions of Patagonia and Tierra del Fuego in the south to Ecuador and Peru in the north, with some populations extending into southern Colombia. It is also found in the Sierras Grandes mountain range in Córdoba, Argentina. It is most common on the western slopes of the Andes, where it inhabits open country and deciduous forests.

== Habitat ==
The culpeo lives in a wide variety of habitats of western South America. They are found in broadleaf Nothofagus temperate rainforest, sclerophyllous matorral, deserts, chaparrals, and plateaus, like the Altiplano, up to the tree line (4,800 metres (15,700 ft)).

== Diet ==
The culpeo is an opportunistic predator that will take any variety of prey. It mainly feeds on rodents (including common degus) and lagomorphs (especially the introduced European rabbit and European hare); however, it occasionally feeds on domestic livestock and young guanacos. They will also feed on insects, birds, lizards, fruit, and carrion of llamas and vicuñas. Culpeos are considered beneficial because they are significant predators of the rabbits introduced in 1915; such introduced rabbit populations are believed to have allowed culpeos to spread from the Andean foothills across the Patagonian plain. They sometimes take young lambs up to 1 week old. In limited studies, the larger culpeo appears to dominate potential competitors, including South American gray foxes, Geoffroy's cats, pampas cats, grisons and various raptorial birds. In the southeastern Argentine Patagonia region, culpeos generally tend to consume more of the introduced European hare than the South American gray fox does year-round, while the gray fox tends to consume more rodents. However, during colder seasons, the culpeo's diet overlaps more with the gray fox due to a lack of variety in prey, thus causing prey partitioning as the culpeos use their size advantage to exclude the gray fox from areas with higher concentrations of prey. Its geographic range also overlaps that of the much larger puma, but the interspecific size difference limits competition between the two predators. They are known to eat the carcasses of vicuñas. Culpeos have also been observed preying upon introduced beavers in Tierra del Fuego. During a period of drought in central Chile's scrublands lagomorphs, coati, goats, and cattle make up a large amount of their diet.

== Reproduction ==
The typical mating period is between August and October. After a gestation period of 55–60 days, the female gives birth usually to between two and five pups.

== Classification ==
=== Subspecies ===
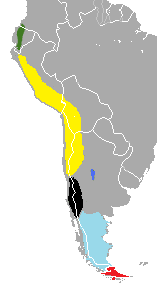
Subspecies distribution: L. c. reissii (green); L. c. andinus (yellow); L. c. smithersi (blue); L. c. culpaeus (black); L. c. magellanicus (cyan); L. c. lycoides (red)

Lycalopex culpaeus
Subspecies	Authority	Range	Image
Altiplano culpeo L. c. andinus	(Thomas, 1914)	Found in Peru, Bolivia, northern Chile and northern Argentina	
Culpeo L. c. culpaeus	(Molina, 1782)	Found in central Chile and central Argentina	
Fuegian culpeo L. c. lycoides	(Philippi, 1896)	Found in Tierra del Fuego, in Chile and Argentina	
Patagonian culpeo L. c. magellanicus	(Gray, 1837)	Found in southern Chile and southern Argentina	
Ecuadorian culpeo L. c. reissii	(Hilzheimer, 1906)	Found in Ecuador and southern Colombia	
Achalan red fox L. c. smithersi	(Thomas, 1914)	Found in the Sierras Pampeanas in Argentina	

=== Taxonomy ===
The taxonomy of the culpeo has been the topic of debate due to their high phenetic variability and the scarcity of research, among other things. Over the past three decades, they have been placed variably in the genera Dusicyon (Clutton-Brock, et al., 1976; Wozencraft, 1989), Canis (Langguth, 1975; Van Gelder, 1978), Pseudalopex (Berta, 1987; Wozencraft, 1993; Tedford et al., 1995) and Lycalopex (Zunino, 1995; Wozencraft, 2005).

This canid, like other South American foxes, is still sometimes classified as a member of the genus Pseudalopex. As Pseudalopex and Lycalopex have largely come to describe the same genus, either classification is acceptable, although the modern practice is to give Lycalopex prominence.

The following phylogenetic tree shows the evolutionary relationships between the Lycalopex species, based on molecular analysis of mitochondrial DNA control region sequences by a study in 2016.

- Lycalopex
  - Hoary fox
  - - Sechuran fox
    - - - Darwin's fox
        - Pampas fox
      - - South American gray fox
        - Culpeo

== Domestication ==
The culpeo was domesticated by the Selkʼnam people of Tierra del Fuego, producing the Fuegian dog. They were used in hunting, fishing, and as a source of warmth in shelters. They became extinct in the late 19th or early 20th century as part of the Selknam genocide.

== Gallery ==
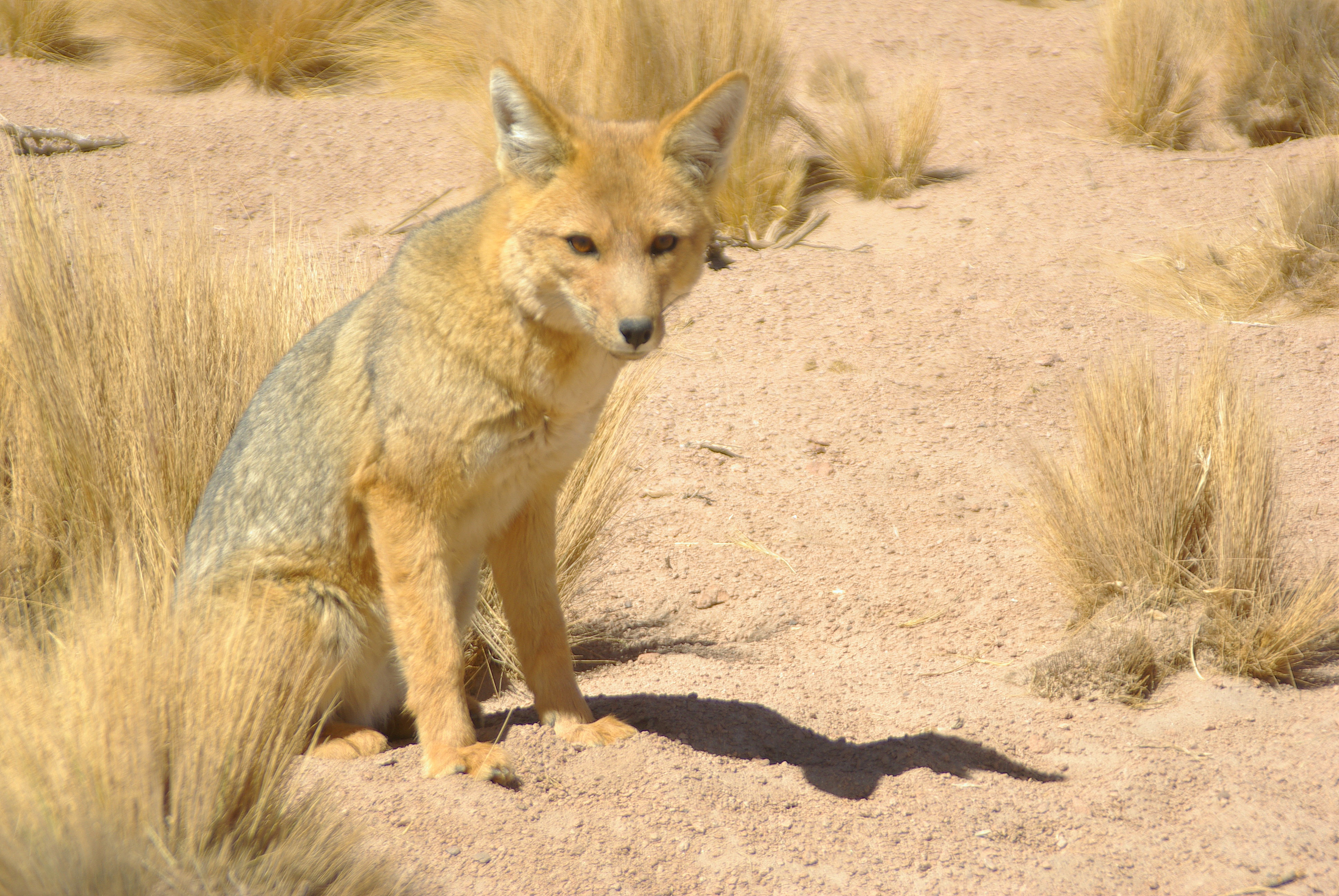
A culpeo in the Antofagasta Region (2010)

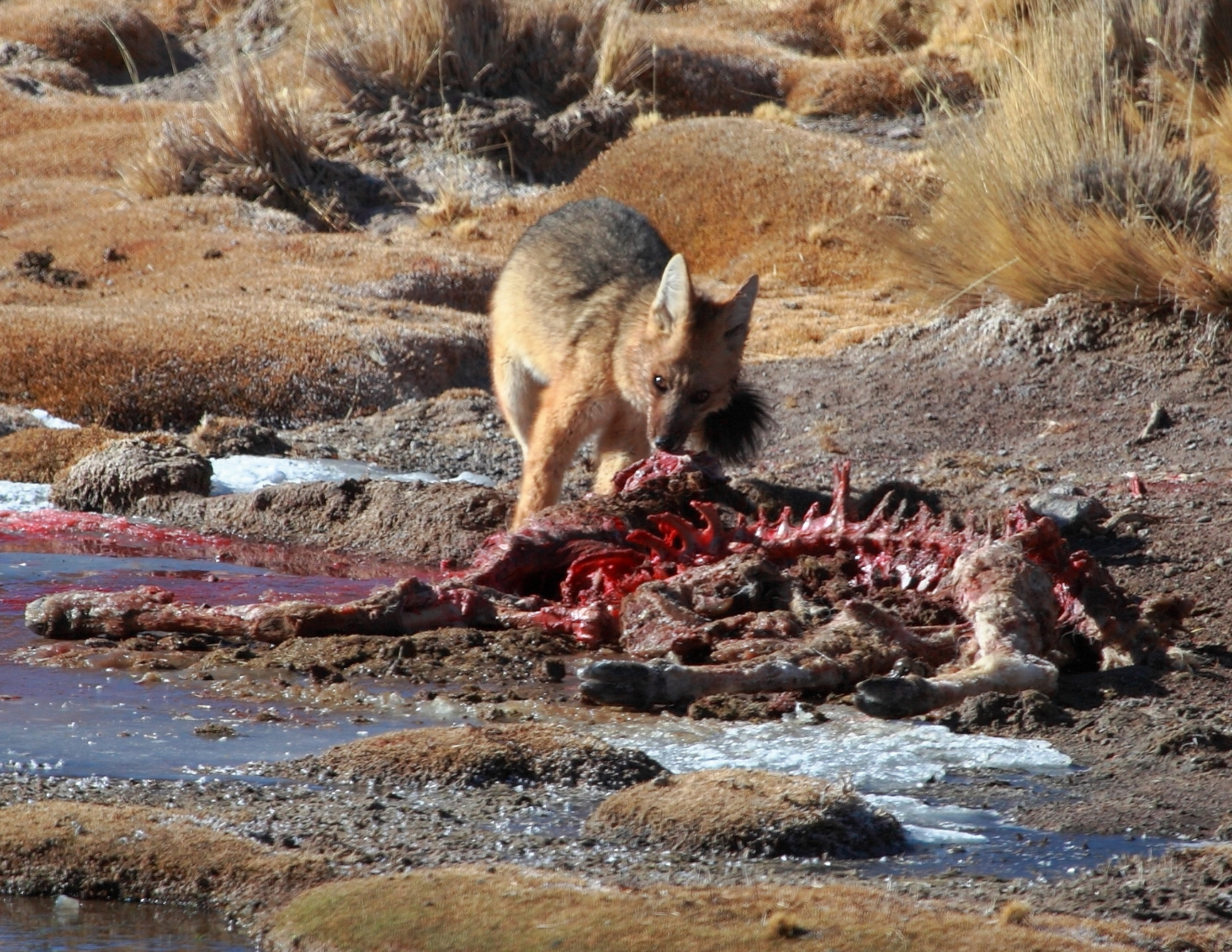
A culpeo feasting on the carcass of a vicuña at El Tatio, San Pedro de Atacama, in the Antofagasta Region (2013)

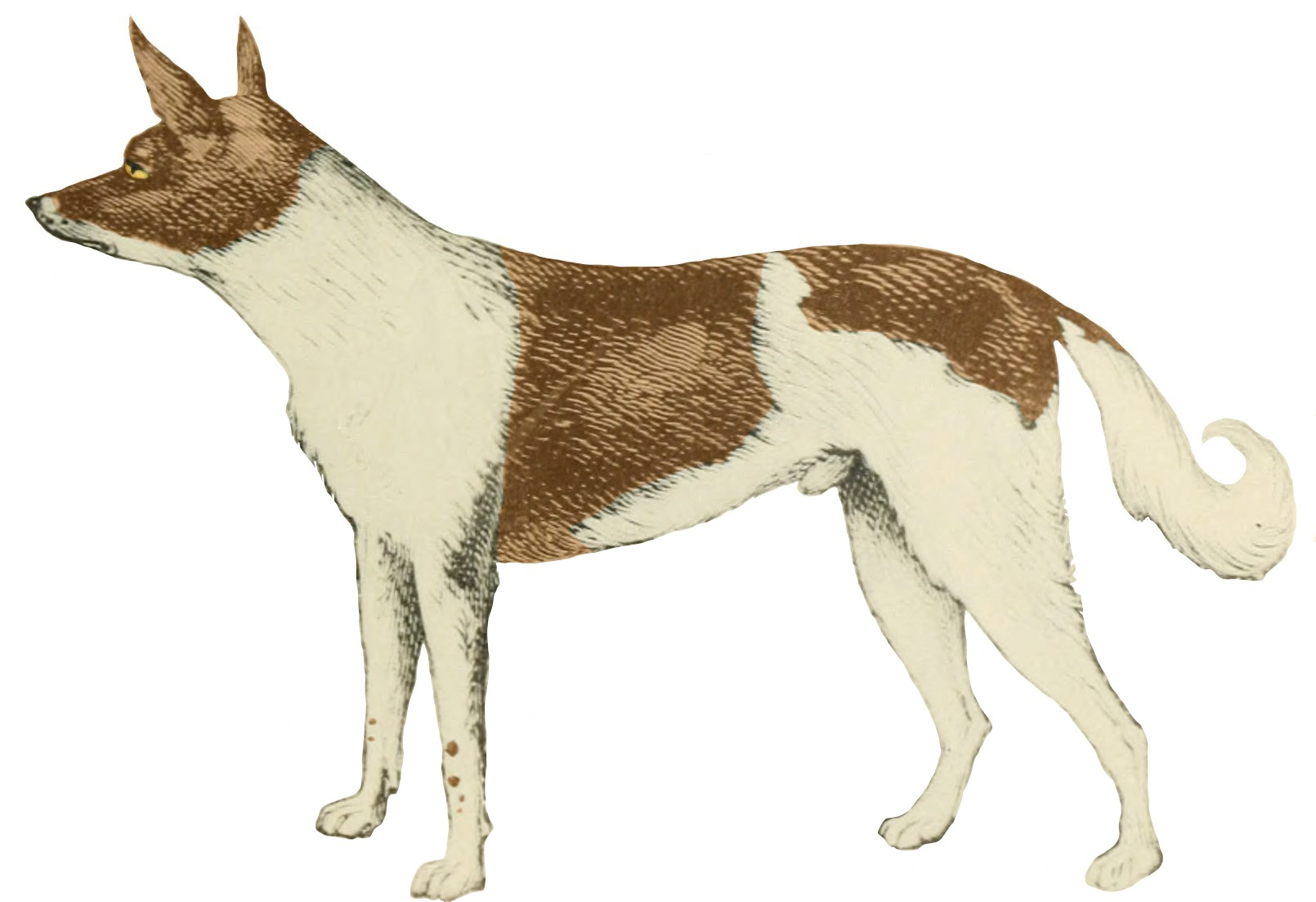
Colorized sketch of Tapan, a Fuegian dog, by Philippe Alexandre Jules Künckel d'Herculais (1884)

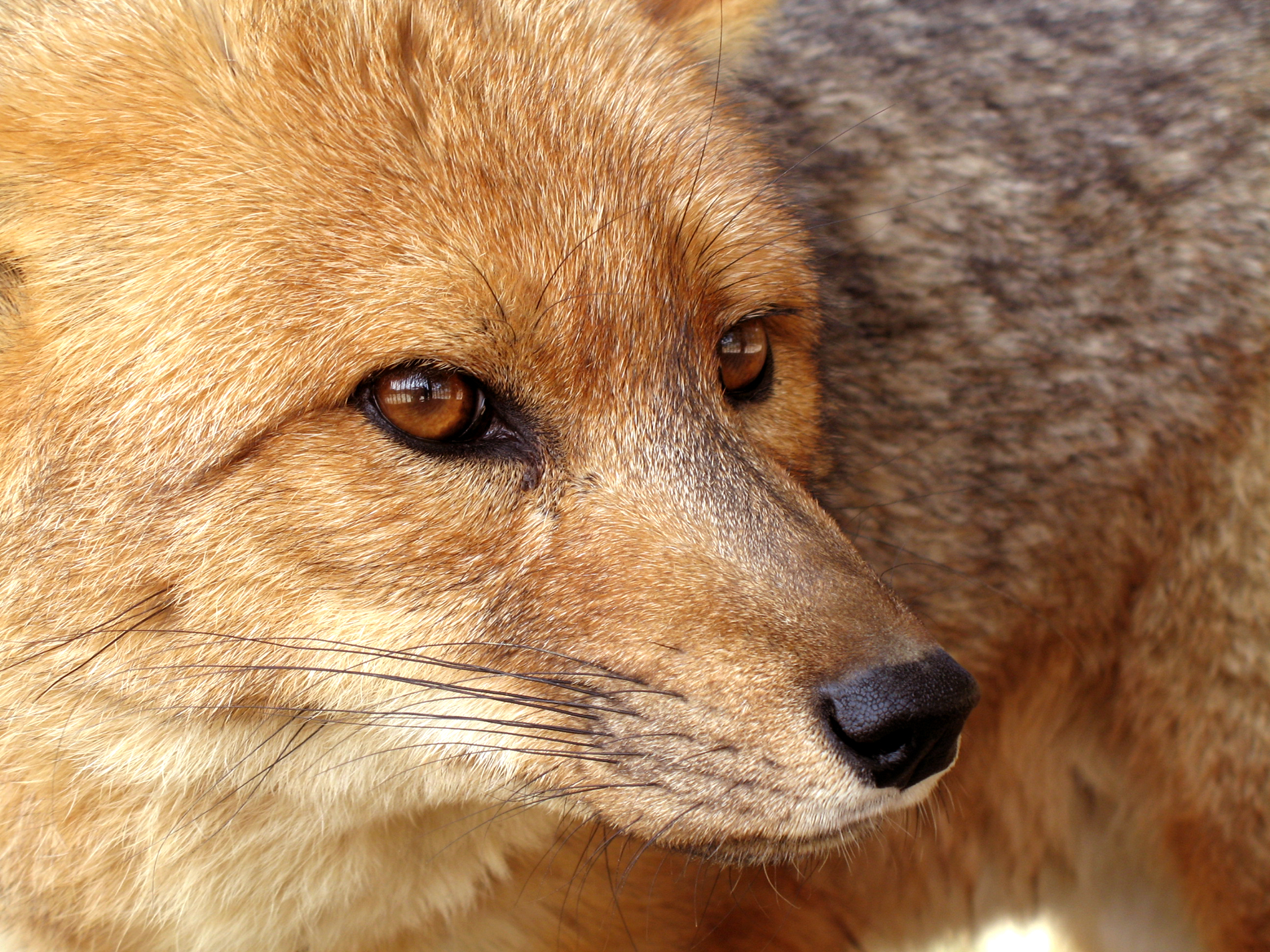
Close-up of a culpeo's head
