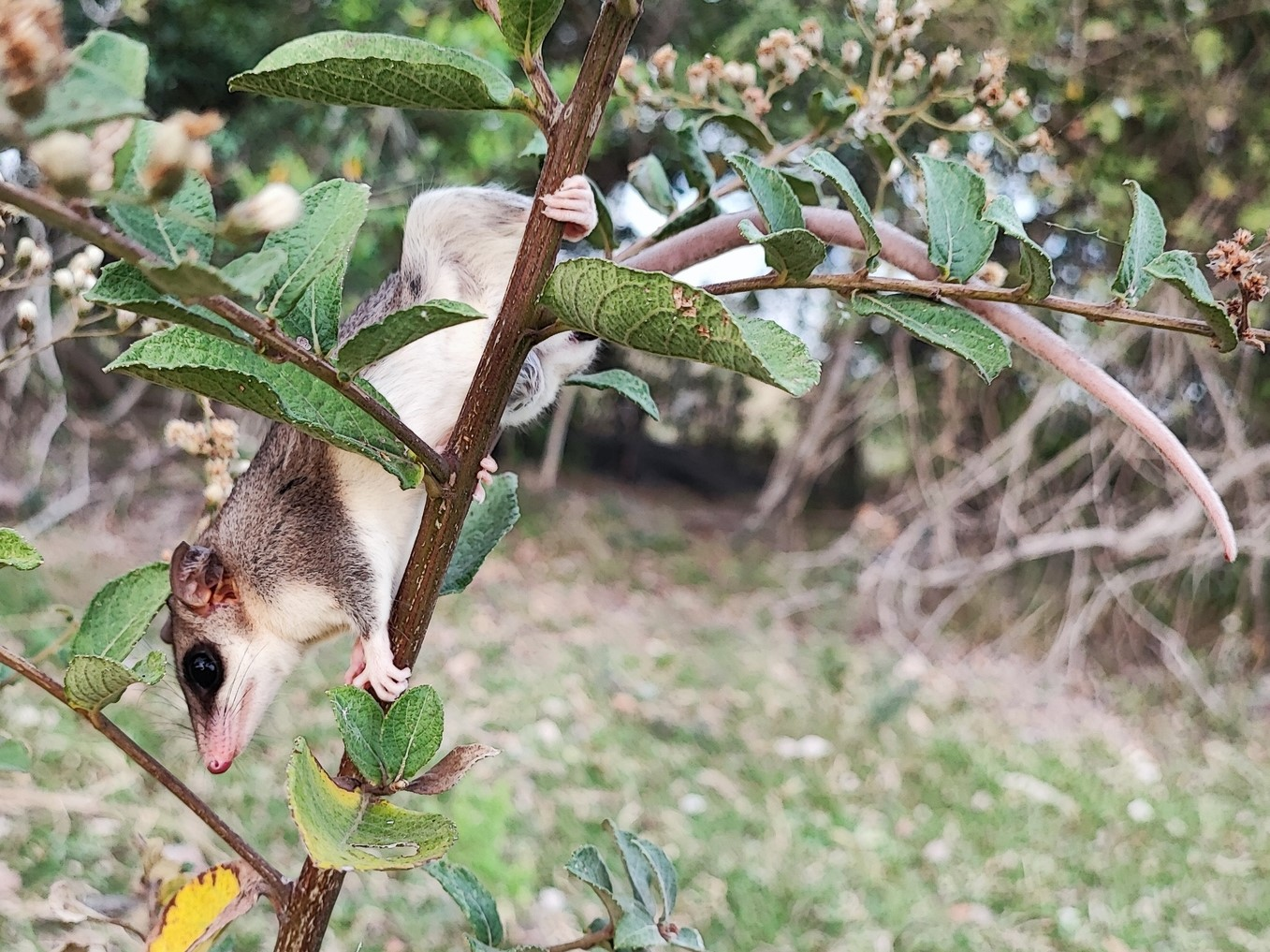

Conservation status
- Near Threatened (IUCN 3.1)

Scientific classification
- Kingdom: Animalia
- Phylum: Chordata
- Class: Mammalia
- Infraclass: Marsupialia
- Order: Didelphimorphia
- Family: Didelphidae
- Genus: Thylamys
- Species: T. macrurus

Binomial name
- Thylamys macrurus (Olfers, 1818)
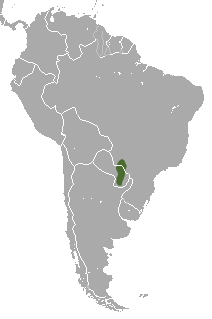
- Paraguayan fat-tailed mouse opossum range

= Paraguayan fat-tailed mouse opossum =

Species of marsupial

The Paraguayan fat-tailed mouse opossum (Thylamys macrurus) is a species of opossum in the family Didelphidae. It is found in forested areas of Brazil and Paraguay.

== Description ==
It is known only from a few specimens. For two listed specimens, one had a head-and-body length of about 135 mm and a tail length of about 140 mm, while the other had a head-and-body length of about 120 mm and a tail length of about 155 mm. Most of its fur is gray, but the shoulder areas are reddish gray, and the ventral fur is pure white or creamy white. There is also a ring of black fur surrounding each eye. The ventral surface of the tail is white. The dorsal surface of the tail is gray for the first one third to one half of its length (going from the base to the tip); the remainder of the dorsal surface of the tail is white. The tail is hairless except for about its first ten mm (going from the base to the tip). Although the genus Thylamys is characterized by fat storage in the tail, there is no evidence that this species stores fat in its tail.
