= Buff-bellied fat-tailed mouse opossum =

Conservation status
- Data Deficient (IUCN 3.1)

Scientific classification
- Kingdom: Animalia
- Phylum: Chordata
- Class: Mammalia
- Infraclass: Marsupialia
- Order: Didelphimorphia
- Family: Didelphidae
- Genus: Thylamys
- Species: T. venustus

Binomial name
- Thylamys venustus (Thomas, 1902)
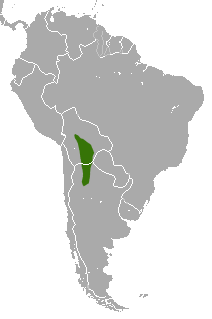
- Buff-bellied fat-tailed mouse opossum range

Synonyms
- Marmosa elegans venusta (Thomas, 1902); Marmosa elegans cinderella (Thomas, 1902); Marmosa elegans sponsoria (Thomas, 1921); Marmosa janetta (Thomas, 1926)

Species of marsupial

The buff-bellied fat-tailed mouse opossum (Thylamys venustus) is a species of opossum in the family Didelphidae. It is found in the transitional and humid forests of northern Argentina and southern Bolivia. Its dorsal fur is cinnamon brown. Most of its ventral fur is gray-based, but its chest, throat, and the thoracic midline (the midline of the thorax, which ranges from the throat to the top of the abdomen) are not gray-based. The postorbital ridges are absent in the young and weakly developed in adults.

Initially classed as a Marmosa elegans subspecies, it was subsequently raised to species status in 1933. There are four synonyms: Marmosa elegans venusta (Thomas, 1902, Cochabamba), Marmosa elegans cinderella (Thomas, 1902, Tucumán Province), Marmosa elegans sponsoria (Thomas, 1921, Jujuy Province) and Marmosa janetta (Thomas, 1926, Tarija Department) with cinderella and sponsoria actually being one taxon and a subspecies of venustus; janetta is the largest of all and has cream-white ventral fur with plumbeous bases.

Its conservation status is not exactly known; it occurs in an area currently being developed, and while its range overlaps several protected areas, it is uncertain if it occurs in any of them.
