= Common fat-tailed mouse opossum =

Conservation status
- Least Concern (IUCN 3.1)

Scientific classification
- Kingdom: Animalia
- Phylum: Chordata
- Class: Mammalia
- Infraclass: Marsupialia
- Order: Didelphimorphia
- Family: Didelphidae
- Genus: Thylamys
- Species: T. pusillus

Binomial name
- Thylamys pusillus (Desmarest, 1804)
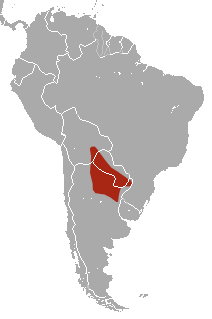
- Common fat-tailed mouse opossum range

Species of marsupial

The common fat-tailed mouse opossum (Thylamys pusillus) is a species of opossum in the family Didelphidae. It occurs in Argentina, Bolivia, and Paraguay in chaco and Andean foothill habitats. Its head-and-body length is about 75 to 120 (mean 94.3) mm, and its tail length is about 90 to 134 (mean 103.6) mm. Its dorsal fur is brownish gray, and its ventral fur is yellowish to white. The legs and cheeks are the same color as the ventral surface. Its tail is sharply bicolored (divided into two colors). A ring of faintly darker fur surrounds each eye. Its tail often lacks fat deposits, but does not always.
