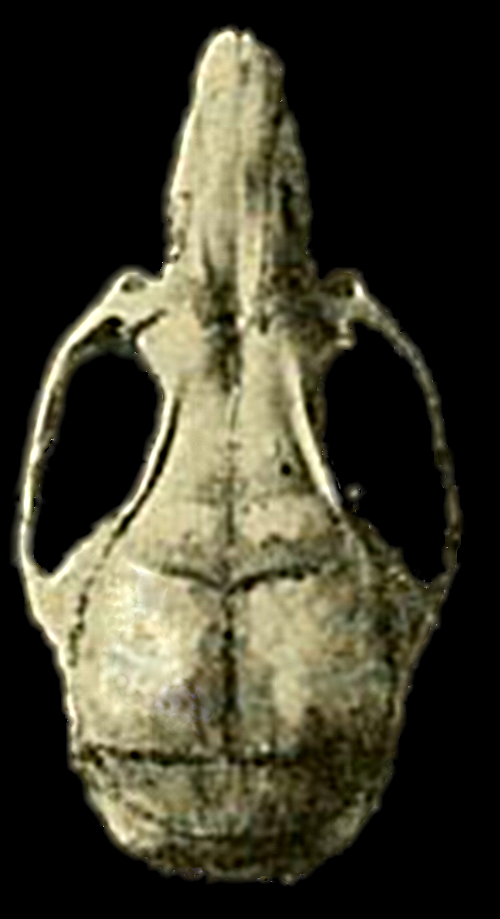
- Skull from Cerro Azul, Panama, seen from above

Conservation status
- Least Concern (IUCN 3.1)

Scientific classification
- Kingdom: Animalia
- Phylum: Chordata
- Class: Mammalia
- Order: Rodentia
- Family: Cricetidae
- Subfamily: Sigmodontinae
- Genus: Transandinomys
- Species: T. bolivaris

Binomial name
- Transandinomys bolivaris (J.A. Allen, 1901)
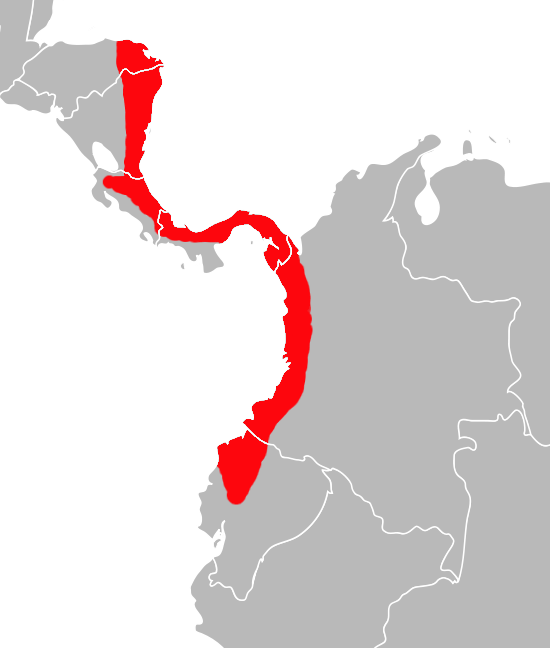
- Distribution of Transandinomys bolivaris in southern Central and northwestern South America

Synonyms
- Oryzomys bolivaris J.A. Allen, 1901; Oryzomys castaneus J.A. Allen, 1901; Oryzomys rivularis J.A. Allen, 1901; Oryzomys bombycinus Goldman, 1912; Oryzomys nitidus alleni Goldman, 1915; Oryzomys bombycinus orinus Pearson, 1939; Transandinomys bolivaris: Weksler, Percequillo, and Voss, 2006

= Transandinomys bolivaris =

Small rodent found from northeastern Honduras to western Ecuador

Transandinomys bolivaris, also known as the long-whiskered rice rat, is a rodent in the family Cricetidae. It is found in humid forest from northeastern Honduras to western Ecuador, up to 1,800 m (5,900 ft) above sea level. Since it was first described in 1901 from Ecuador, six scientific names have been introduced for it, but their common identity was not documented until 1998 and the species has long been known under the name Oryzomys bombycinus, described from Panama in 1912. The name Oryzomys bolivaris was used before it was moved to the new genus Transandinomys with Transandinomys talamancae (formerly Oryzomys talamancae) in 2006.

It is a medium-sized rice rat distinguished by its very long vibrissae (whiskers)—those above the eyes are up to 50 mm (2 in) long. The fur, which is soft and dense, is usually dark brown above and light gray below; it is darker in juveniles. The feet are long and the tail is about as long as the head and body. The skull is narrow and has a broad interorbital region (between the eyes). The species generally lives on the ground. Although it is rare, its conservation status is thought to be secure.

== Taxonomy ==
In 1901, Joel Asaph Allen described four new species of rice rat in the genus Oryzomys: three from Ecuador and the Peruvian Oryzomys perenensis. The three Ecuadorian species–Oryzomys bolivaris from Porvenir, (Note: In 1998, Musser and colleagues were unable to identify the precise location of this place; see there for discussion.) Bolívar Province; Oryzomys castaneus from San Javier, Esmeraldas Province; and Oryzomys rivularis from Río Verde, Pichincha Province—were each based on a single specimen collected in 1899 or 1900. He distinguished the three on the basis of coloration, size, and relative tail length. Philip Hershkovitz listed all three among the many synonyms of "Oryzomys laticeps" (currently more narrowly defined as Hylaeamys laticeps) in a 1960 paper.

Edward Alphonso Goldman described Oryzomys bombycinus in 1912 from four specimens from Panama. He compared it to Oryzomys talamancae and placed it with the "Oryzomys laticeps group". Three years later, he described Oryzomys nitidus alleni from Costa Rica as a subspecies of Oryzomys nitidus, without mentioning bombycinus. He revised Oryzomys of North America in 1918 and recognized Oryzomys bombycinus as the only member of its own group, with alleni as a subspecies distinguished by the proportions of the skull. He also mentioned that the group occurred in Ecuador and indicated that O. bombycinus probably reached Colombia. Goldman considered the group to be similar to O. talamancae, but suggested that bombycinus and alleni might only be subspecies of O. nitidus. In 1939, Oliver Pearson added a third subspecies, O. b. orinus, from eastern Panama, and in 1966 the species was first recorded from Colombia. Ronald Pine reviewed Oryzomys bombycinus in 1971, when 59 specimens of it were known, and first recorded the species from Nicaragua and Ecuador. He kept the three described subspecies—alleni from Nicaragua to western Panama, bombycinus from central Panama, and orinus from eastern Panama to Ecuador.

Alfred Gardner and James Patton suggested in 1976 that Allen's O. rivularis may be the same species as O. bombycinus. They considered O. bolivaris as probably the same as O. nitidus and listed castaneus as a synonym of O. capito (equivalent to modern Hylaeamys megacephalus and closely related species plus Transandinomys talamancae). In 1984, Benshoof and colleagues reported the first record of Oryzomys bombycinus from Honduras. Guy Musser and Marina Williams reviewed O. talamancae in 1985 and included O. castaneus as one of its synonyms, though without having examined the holotype. In the 1993 second edition of Mammal Species of the World, Musser and Michael Carleton used the name Oryzomys bolivaris for the species previously known as O. bombycinus, and in 1998, Musser and colleagues fully documented the allocation of the names bolivaris, castaneus, rivularis, bombycinus, alleni, and orinus to the same species, Oryzomys bolivaris. They noted its similarity to O. talamancae, but did not attempt to determine phylogenetic relationships among the species they discussed. In their limited material, they found geographic variation within the species inconsequential and they recognized no subspecies.

In 2006, Marcelo Weksler published a phylogenetic analysis of Oryzomyini ("rice rats"), the tribe to which Oryzomys is allocated, using morphological and DNA sequence data. His results showed species of Oryzomys dispersed across Oryzomyini and suggested that most species in the genus should be allocated to new genera. Later in the same year, he, together with Alexandre Percequillo and Robert Voss, named ten new genera for these species, including Transandinomys, which has Oryzomys talamancae (now Transandinomys talamancae) as its type species. They also included Oryzomys bolivaris in Transandinomys, so that it is now named Transandinomys bolivaris, although it had not been included in Weksler's phylogenetic study. The two species are morphologically similar, but they could identify only one synapomorphy (shared-derived trait) for them: very long superciliary vibrissae (whiskers above the eyes). Transandinomys is one of about 30 genera in Oryzomyini, a diverse assemblage of American rodents of over a hundred species, and on higher taxonomic levels in the subfamily Sigmodontinae of family Cricetidae, along with hundreds of other species of mainly small rodents.

Various authors have used the common name "long-whiskered rice rat" for this species, but several other names have been proposed. In 1918, Goldman named O. bombycinus bombycinus the "Long-Haired Rice Rat" and O. b. alleni the "Allen Rice Rat". Musser and Carleton, writing in the 2005 third edition of Mammal Species of the World, used "Long-whiskered Oryzomys", the 2009 IUCN Red List gave "Bolivar Rice Rat", and Thomas Lee and colleagues used "Long-whiskered Trans-Andean Rice Rat" in 2010.

== Description ==
Measurements
Region	n (Note: Number of specimens measured. In some samples, the number varies by measurement.)	Head and body	Tail	Hindfoot
Nicaragua	5	108.2 (99–119)	115.2 (99–126)	28.8 (27–32)
Costa Rica, western Panama	9–13	118.7 (103–134)	113.2 (96–125)	30.3 (27–33)
Central Panama	13–15	120.7 (111–140)	120.8 (111–130)	30.0 (27–33)
Eastern Panama	5	116.8 (107–125)	117.6 (109–126)	28.0 (25–29)
Colombia	8	127.4 (115–141)	121.3 (100–135)	30.5 (29–32)
Ecuador	8–9	119.4 (111–133)	114.8 (100–127)	29.7 (28–32)
Measurements are in millimeters and in the form "average (minimum–maximum)".

Transandinomys bolivaris is a medium-sized rice rat with very long superciliary vibrissae (Note: See Musser et al. (1998, fig. 53) and Reid (2009, plate 23, fig. 3) for illustrations.) (more than 50 mm (2.0 in) long and extending well beyond the ears when laid back against the head). According to Fiona Reid's Mammals of Southeastern Mexico & Central America, it is distinguishable from any similarly sized rice rats by the length of these whiskers; T. talamancae also has long superciliary vibrissae, but not as long as in T. bolivaris. In both species, the mystacial vibrissae (above the mouth) are also long and extend beyond the ears when laid back, but they are again much longer in T. bolivaris. The vibrissae are mostly dark, but translucent at the tips. Handleyomys alfaroi, a rice rat with which young T. bolivaris are often confused, is much smaller. In T. bolivaris, the cheeks may be light gray, buff, or reddish. The ears are dark brown to black and are sparsely haired.

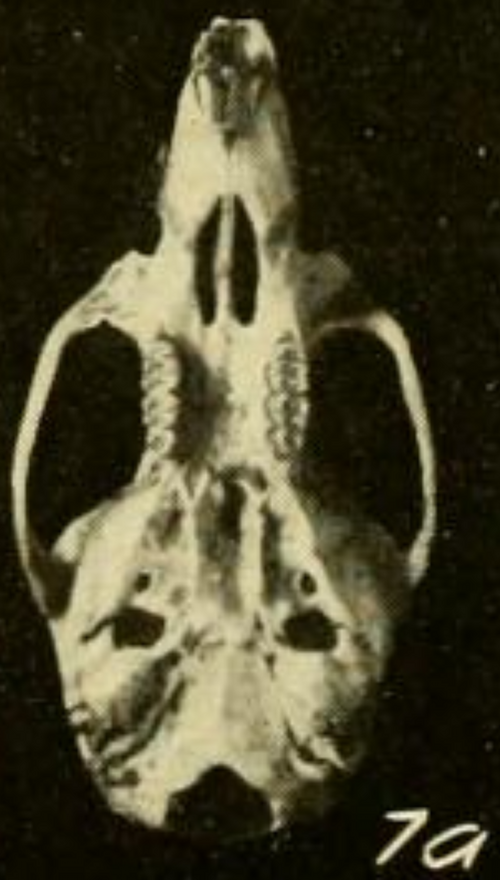
Skull from Cerro Azul, Panama, seen from below

The fur, which is soft, dense, and thick, is dark brown to gray on the upperparts, grading to black on the midback and yellowish brown on the sides. The underparts are sharply different in color. There, the hairs are dark gray at their bases and white at the tips, so that the fur appears grayish white. The fur is shorter and darker than in T. talamancae and softer and thicker than in H. alfaroi. Young animals have darker, finer, and softer fur. Pine separated the subspecies alleni and orinus on the basis of their darker fur, but Musser and colleagues could not confirm this pattern and found paler and darker specimens within the same geographical regions.

The tail appears naked and is shorter than or about as long as the head and body; it is longer in T. talamancae. Its coloration is variable; it is dark brown above and at the sides and light brown and often white to a greater or smaller extent below, and in some specimens the tail has the same color above and below. (Note: This description is based on the detailed account of tail coloration by Musser and colleagues. Other descriptions vary: Reid writes that the tail is bicolored, but Weksler, Percequillo, and Voss state it is unicolored and Tirira that it is unicolored or slightly paler on the underside near the base.) The scales on the tail are smaller than in T. talamancae.

The forearms are dark gray. The forefeet are unpigmented and ungual tufts of white hairs surround the equally unpigmented claws. The animal has long, narrow hindfeet, longer than in T. talamancae, with usually smooth soles (lacking squamae, which are present in T. talamancae). (Note: Weksler and colleagues and Tirira write that the sole is smooth, but Musser and colleagues mention specimens that do have rudimentary squamae between the digits.) The three middle digits are much longer than the outer two. Six pads are present on the sole. The upper surface and the sides of the hindfeet are white and appear naked, although short, white hairs are present; these hairs are longer in T. talamancae. Ungual tufts of long, white or gray hairs are present around the claws, which are short and lack pigment.

Head and body length is 100 to 140 mm (3.9 to 5.5 in), tail length 90 to 130 mm (3.5 to 5.1 in), hindfoot length 27 to 35 mm (1.1 to 1.4 in), ear length 16 to 21 mm (0.63 to 0.83 in), and body mass 39 to 75 g (1.4 to 2.6 oz). Females have four pairs of mammae, as usual in oryzomyines. Like most rice rats, T. bolivaris has twelve thoracic (chest) and seven lumbar vertebrae. A study in Costa Rica found that there are 58 chromosomes, including many that are large and have two arms, and the fundamental number of arms is 80 (2n = 58, FN = 80), a highly differentiated karyotype. The karyotype of T. talamancae is variable, but has fewer chromosomes (34 to 54) and major arms (60 to 67). H. alfaroi has more chromosomes (60 to 62) and major arms (100 to 104).

=== Skull and teeth ===
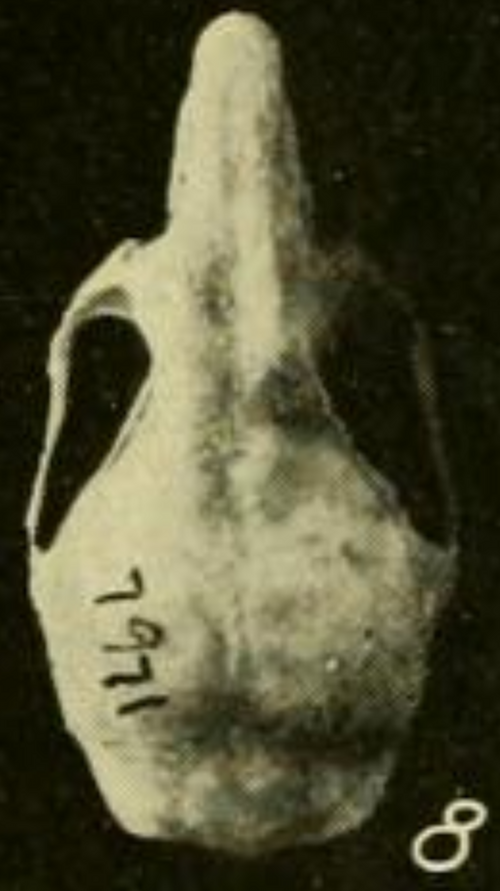
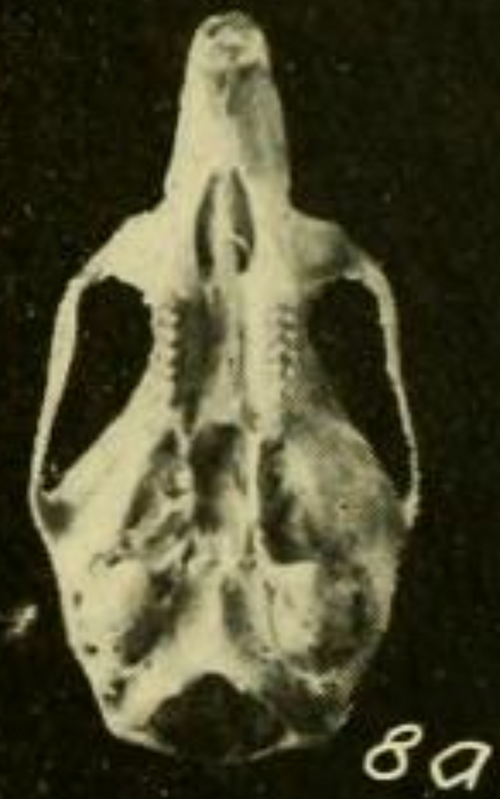
Skull from Tuis, Costa Rica (holotype of Oryzomys nitidus alleni Goldman)

The skull is relatively long and has a long, narrow rostrum (front region), broad interorbital region (between the eyes) and narrow braincase with almost vertically oriented walls at the sides and behind. It differs from that of T. talamancae in various proportions. Although the subspecies previously recognized in "Oryzomys bombycinus" have been separated by small differences in skull features, Pine rejected these on the basis of his much larger samples. Musser and colleagues agreed, but noted that Colombian animals appeared to have larger skulls. The zygomatic plates are broad and the zygomatic arches (cheekbones) behind them are nearly parallel to each other. The margins of the interorbital region contain prominent beads, which extend to the braincase as temporal ridges; these are usually less well-developed in T. talamancae. Unlike in T. talamancae and H. alfaroi, the parietal bone is usually limited to the roof of the braincase and does not extend to the sides.

The incisive foramina, which perforate the front part of the palate, do not extend between the molars. The palate ends beyond the third molars and is perforated by posterolateral palatal pits there. Behind it, the roof of the mesopterygoid fossa is perforated by poorly developed sphenopalatine vacuities. The auditory bullae, which house the inner ear, are large. Usually, the mastoid bone lacks openings (fenestrae), which are present in T. talamancae. The pattern of the arteries in the head is primitive, as indicated by the condition of various foramina (openings) and grooves in the skull.

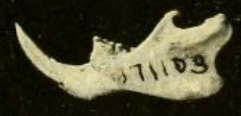
Mandible (lower jaw) of Transandinomys bolivaris from Cerro Azul, Panama

The mandible (lower jaw) looks chunky and has a long condyloid process at its back; that of T. talamancae is more slender. The capsular process, a projection at the back of the jaw which houses the root of the lower incisor, is poorly developed.

The incisors are large and ungrooved. Their enamel is orange, but paler on the lowers. The orientation of the upper incisors is opisthodont, with the cutting edge oriented backwards. The molars are brachydont (low-crowned) and have two rows of main cusps separated by deep valleys and complemented by a network of crests and smaller cusps. The first upper molar is broader than in T. talamancae. As in this species, but unlike in many other rice rats, including H. alfaroi, the mesoflexus on the second upper molar, which separates the paracone (one of the main cusps) from the mesoloph (an accessory crest), is not divided in two by an enamel bridge. The hypoflexid on the second lower molar, the main valley between the cusps, is very long, extending more than halfway across the tooth; in this trait, it is similar to T. talamancae but unlike H. alfaroi. Each of the upper molars has three roots (two on the outer and one on the inner side) and each of the lowers has two (one at the front and another at the back).

== Distribution, ecology, and behavior ==
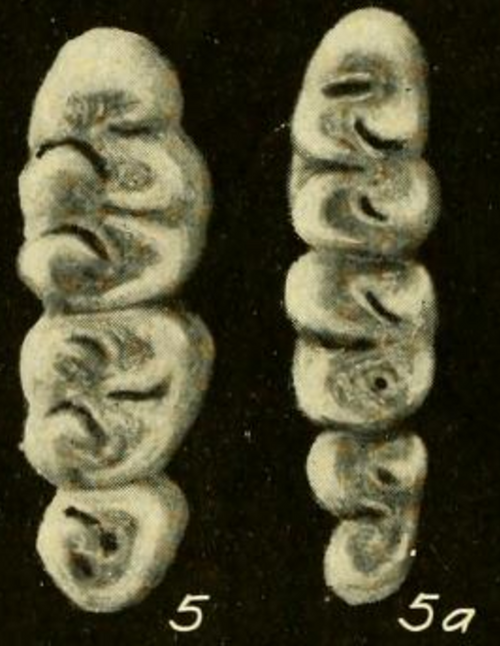
Upper (left) and lower (right) molar rows of a specimen from Cerro Azul, Panama

Transandinomys bolivaris is an uncommon species. Its known distribution extends from northeastern Honduras, on the Caribbean seaboard, through eastern Nicaragua, Costa Rica, and Panama, into coastal western Colombia and northwestern and west-central Ecuador. It has been found near sea level and the upper altitudinal records are at nearly 1,500 m (4,900 ft) in Panama and 1,800 m (5,900 ft) in Ecuador. This distribution coincides with that of the humid Transandean forest. It generally occurs in areas with mean temperatures above 16 °C (60.8 °F) and annual rainfall of 4,000 to 6,000 mm (157 to 236 in), prefers mid-elevation forests (600 to 900 m or 1,970 to 2,950 ft), and often occurs near water. The actual range of this species may be expected to extend further north and west, perhaps into Veracruz, southern Mexico, and western Venezuela, where it has not yet been recorded. Omar Linares mentioned a possible record from the Lake Maracaibo region of northwestern Venezuela in 1998. Its range is similar to that of various other rainforest animals, including the semiplumbeous hawk (Leucopternis semiplumbeus), the rice rats Sigmodontomys alfari and S. aphrastus, the spiny rats Proechimys semispinosus and Hoplomys gymnurus, and the opossum Marmosa zeledoni. T. talamancae and H. alfaroi are often found in the same localities as T. bolivaris, but also occur in other areas.

Little is known of its biology. The species mainly lives on the ground, but some young animals have been taken in vegetation, up to 1.5 m (4.9 ft) above the ground. It is usually captured "under logs, around the roots of large trees, or among rocks along streams." Two females with four embryos each have been caught in Panama in June, one with two in Nicaragua in September, and one with four in Costa Rica in December. A very young specimen was trapped in Costa Rica in March. One pregnant female was herself still in juvenile fur. Four species of mites have been found on T. bolivaris in Panama (Gigantolaelaps gilmorei, G. oudemansi, Laelaps pilifer, and Haemolaelaps glasgowi), two chiggers (Leptotrombidium panamensis and Pseudoschoengastia bulbifera), and two fleas (Polygenis roberti and Polygenis klagesi).

== Conservation status ==
The IUCN Red List lists T. bolivaris as "Least Concern", as it is a widely distributed species with a presumably large population that is found in numerous protected areas. However, habitat destruction by deforestation may pose a threat.

== Literature cited ==
- Allen, J.A. 1901. New South American Muridae and a new Metachirus. Bulletin of the American Museum of Natural History 14:405–412.
- Benshoof, L., Yates, T.L. and Froehlich, J.W. 1984. Noteworthy records of mammals from eastern Honduras (subscription required). The Southwestern Naturalist 29(4):511–514.
- Brennan, J.M. and Yunker, C.E. 1966. The chiggers of Panama (Acarina: Trombiculidae). Pp. 221–266 in Wenzel, R.L. and Tipton, V.J. (eds.). Ectoparasites of Panama. Chicago: Field Museum of Natural History.
- Duff, A. and Lawson, A. 2004. Mammals of the World: A Checklist. New Haven: A & C Black. ISBN 0-7136-6021-X.
- Gardner, A.L. and Patton, J.L. 1976. Karyotypic variation in oryzomyine rodents (Cricetinae) with comments on chromosomal evolution in the Neotropical cricetine complex. Occasional Papers of the Museum of Zoology, Louisiana State University 49:1–48.
- Goldman, E.A. 1912. Descriptions of twelve new species and subspecies of mammals from Panama. Smithsonian Miscellaneous Collections 56(no. 36):1–11.
- Goldman, E.A. 1915. Five new rice rats of the genus Oryzomys from Middle America. Proceedings of the Biological Society of Washington 28:127–130.
- Goldman, E.A. 1918. The rice rats of North America. North American Fauna 43:1–100.
- Hershkovitz, P.M. 1960. Mammals of northern Colombia, preliminary report no. 8: Arboreal rice rats, a systematic revision of the subgenus Oecomys, genus Oryzomys. Proceedings of the United States National Museum 110:513–568.
- Lee, T.E., Jr., Burneo, S.F., Cochran, T.J. and Chávez, D. 2010. Small mammals of Santa Rosa, southwestern Imbabura Province, Ecuador. Occasional Papers, Museum of Texas Tech University 290:1–14.
- Linares, O.J. 1998. Mamíferos de Venezuela. Caracas: Sociedad Conservacionista Audubon de Venezuela and British Petroleum, 691 pp. (in Spanish). ISBN 980-6326-16-4
- Musser, G. G.; Carleton, M. D. (2005). "Superfamily Muroidea". In Wilson, D. E.; Reeder, D. M. (eds.). Mammal Species of the World: A Taxonomic and Geographic Reference (3rd ed.). Johns Hopkins University Press. pp. 894–1531. ISBN 978-0-8018-8221-0. OCLC 62265494.
- Musser, G.G. and Williams, M.M. 1985. Systematic studies of oryzomyine rodents (Muridae): Definitions of Oryzomys villosus and Oryzomys talamancae. American Museum Novitates 2810:1–22.
- Musser, G.G., Carleton, M.D., Brothers, E.M. and Gardner, A.L. 1998. Systematic studies of oryzomyine rodents (Muridae: Sigmodontinae): diagnoses and distributions of species formerly assigned to Oryzomys "capito". Bulletin of the American Museum of Natural History 236:1–376.
- Pearson, O.P. 1939. Three new small mammals from eastern Panama. Notulae Naturae, Academy of Natural Sciences (Philadelphia) 6:1–5.
- Pine, R.H. 1971. A review of the long-whiskered rice rat, Oryzomys bombycinus Goldman (subscription required). Journal of Mammalogy 52:590–596.
- Reid, F.A. (2009). A Field Guide to the Mammals of Central America & Southeast Mexico (2nd ed.). Oxford University Press. ISBN 978-0-19-534322-9. OCLC 312626014.
- Reid, F.A. and Langtimm, C.A. 1993. Distributional and natural history notes for selected mammals from Costa Rica (subscription required). The Southwestern Naturalist 38:299–302.
- Rossi, R.V., Voss, R.S. and Lunde, D.P. 2010. A revision of the didelphid marsupial genus Marmosa. Part 1. The species in Tate's 'mexicana' and 'mitis' sections and other closely related forms. Bulletin of the American Museum of Natural History 334:1–83.
- Steppan, S.J. 1995. Revision of the tribe Phyllotini (Rodentia: Sigmodontinae), with a phylogenetic hypothesis for the Sigmodontinae. Fieldiana Zoology 80:1–112.
- Tipton, V.J. and Méndez, E. 1966. The fleas (Siphonaptera) of Panama. Pp. 289–385 in Wenzel, R.L. and Tipton, V.J. (eds.). Ectoparasites of Panama. Chicago: Field Museum of Natural History.
- Tipton, V.J., Altman, R.M. and Keenan, C.M. 1966. Mites of the subfamily Laelaptinae in Panama (Acarina: Laelaptidae). Pp. 23–82 in Wenzel, R.L. and Tipton, V.J. (eds.). Ectoparasites of Panama. Chicago: Field Museum of Natural History.
- Tirira, D. 2007. Guia de campo de los mamíferos del Ecuador. Quito: Ediciones Murciélago Blanco, publicación especial sobre los mamíferos del Ecuador 6, 576 pp. (in Spanish). ISBN 9978-44-651-6
- Weksler, M. 2006. Phylogenetic relationships of oryzomyine rodents (Muroidea: Sigmodontinae): separate and combined analyses of morphological and molecular data. Bulletin of the American Museum of Natural History 296:1–149.
- Weksler, M., Percequillo, A.R. and Voss, R.S. 2006. Ten new genera of oryzomyine rodents (Cricetidae: Sigmodontinae). American Museum Novitates 3537:1–29.
