= Large-headed rice rat =

Large-headed rice rat can refer to two species of rice rats in the genus Hylaeamys:

- Hylaeamys laticeps, or Atlantic forest oryzomys
- Hylaeamys megacephalus, or Azara's broad-headed oryzomys
