= Hoplopleura oryzomydis =

Scientific classification
- Domain: Eukaryota
- Kingdom: Animalia
- Phylum: Arthropoda
- Class: Insecta
- Order: Psocodea
- Family: Hoplopleuridae
- Genus: Hoplopleura
- Species: H. oryzomydis

Binomial name
- Hoplopleura oryzomydis Pratt and Lane, 1951

Species of louse

Hoplopleura oryzomydis is a sucking louse that is known from the southern United States, Nicaragua, Panama, and Venezuela. It is known from several oryzomyine rodents: the marsh rice rat (Oryzomys palustris), O. couesi, Handleyomys alfaroi, Transandinomys talamancae, Melanomys caliginosus, and Sigmodontomys alfari.

== Literature cited ==
- Durden, Lance A.; Musser, Guy G. (January 19, 1994). "The sucking lice (Insecta, Anoplura) of the world: a taxonomic checklist with records of mammalian hosts and geographical distributions". Bulletin of the American Museum of Natural History (218): 1–90. hdl:2246/825.
