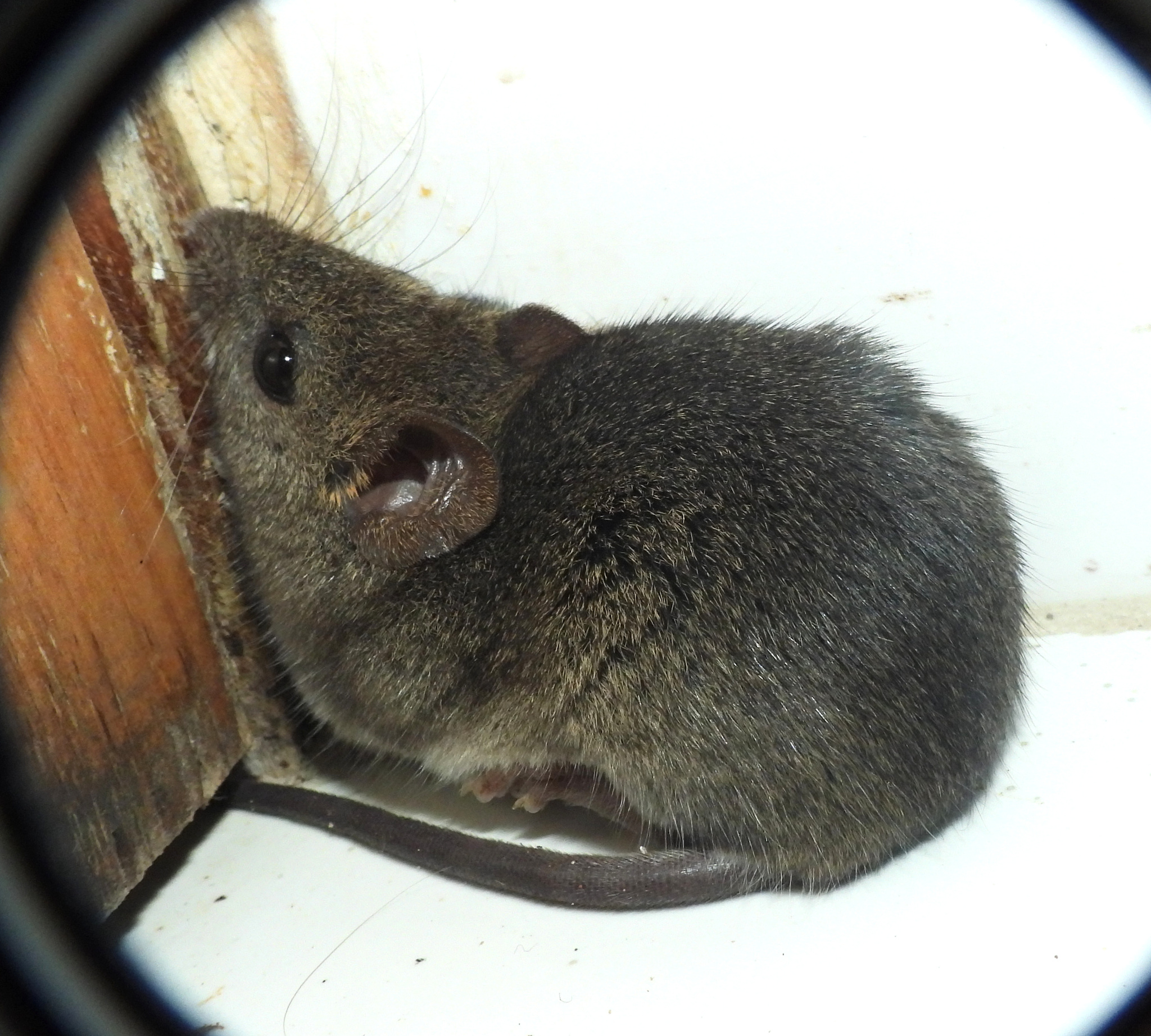

Conservation status
- Least Concern (IUCN 3.1)

Scientific classification
- Kingdom: Animalia
- Phylum: Chordata
- Class: Mammalia
- Order: Rodentia
- Family: Cricetidae
- Subfamily: Sigmodontinae
- Genus: Hylaeamys
- Species: H. megacephalus

Binomial name
- Hylaeamys megacephalus (Fischer, 1814)

Synonyms
- Mus megacephalus Fischer, 1814; Oryzomys megacephalus (Fischer, 1814); Oryzomys capito (Olfers, 1818)

= Hylaeamys megacephalus =

Large-headed rice rat

Species of rodent

Hylaeamys megacephalus, commonly known as Azara's broad-headed oryzomys or the large-headed rice rat, is a species of rodent in the genus Hylaeamys of family Cricetidae, of which it is the type species. It is found mainly in lowland tropical rainforest from its type locality in Paraguay north through central Brazil, French Guiana, Guyana, Suriname, and Venezuela onto Trinidad and Tobago. To its west and east, other closely related species of Hylaeamys are found: H. perenensis in western Amazonia, H. acritus in Bolivia, and H. laticeps and H. oniscus in the Atlantic Forest of eastern Brazil.

== Taxonomy ==
It was first described by Spanish naturalist Félix de Azara. Based on his description, several names were given to the animal, including Mus megacephalus Fischer, 1814 and Mus capito Olfers, 1818, both of which were largely forgotten for over a century. When capito was rediscovered in 1960, it came in use (as Oryzomys capito) for a "species" that included about all species now placed in Euryoryzomys, Hylaeamys and Transandinomys. Later, its scope was restricted, most definitively in a detailed study in 1998 by Guy Musser and coworkers, who also reinstated the older name Mus megacephalus (as Oryzomys megacephalus). In subsequent years, the western Amazonian H. perenensis was reinstated as a species and both were moved to the new genus Hylaeamys, because they are not closely related to the type species of Oryzomys.
