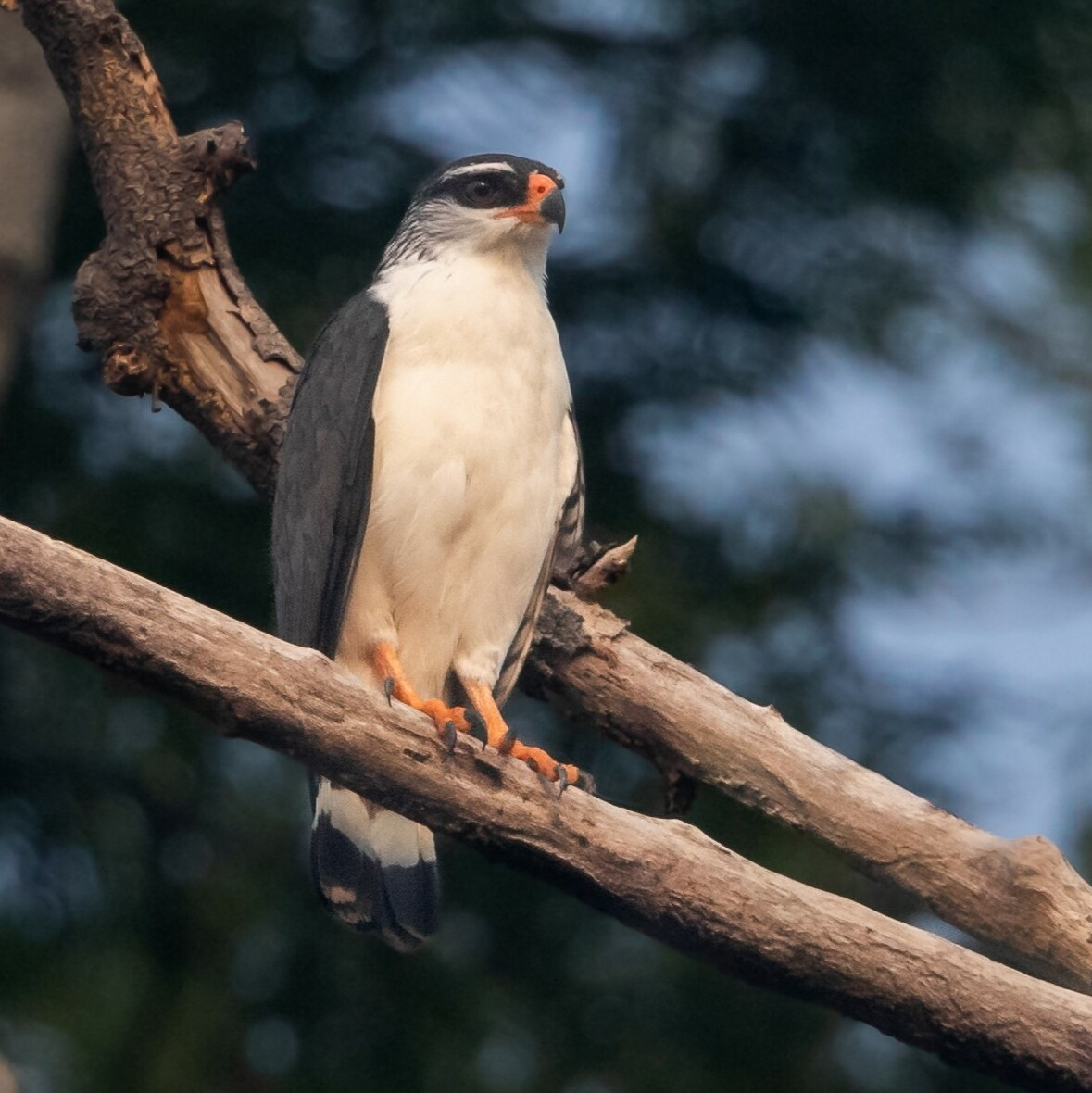

Conservation status
- Least Concern (IUCN 3.1)

Scientific classification
- Kingdom: Animalia
- Phylum: Chordata
- Class: Aves
- Order: Accipitriformes
- Family: Accipitridae
- Genus: Leucopternis
- Species: L. kuhli

Binomial name
- Leucopternis kuhli Bonaparte, 1850

= White-browed hawk =

Species of bird

The white-browed hawk (Leucopternis kuhli) is a species of bird of prey in subfamily Accipitrinae, the "true" hawks, of family Accipitridae. It is found Bolivia, Brazil, and Peru.

== Taxonomy and systematics ==
The white-browed hawk and the black-faced hawk (L. melanops) are sister species and have sometimes been considered conspecific. They share genus Leucopternis with the semiplumbeous hawk (L. semiplumbeus). The white-browed hawk is monotypic.

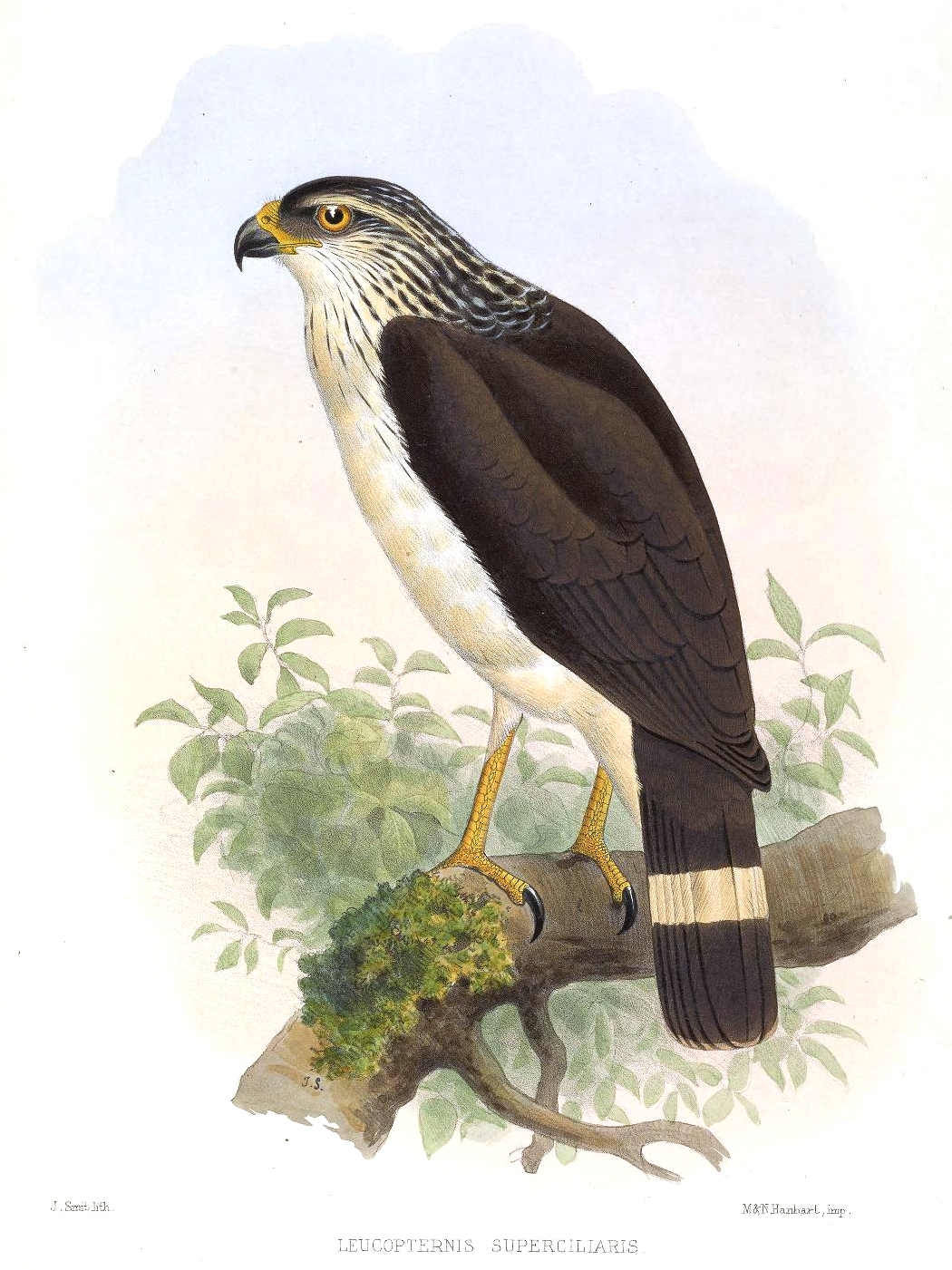
Illustration by Josephe Smit, 1869

== Description ==
The white-browed hawk is 37 to 40 cm (15 to 16 in) long with a 65 to 76 cm (26 to 30 in) wingspan. Females are larger than males and both sexes have the same plumage. They have a dark head with a narrow white stripe above the eye. Their upperparts are black with white streaks on their nape and mantle. Their tail is black with a wide white band at the midpoint. Their underparts are white. Their eye is brown or reddish brown and their cere, legs, and feet are orange.

== Distribution and habitat ==
The white-browed hawk is found south of the Amazon River. It occurs in eastern Peru between the departments of Loreto and Madre de Dios, in northern and northeastern Bolivia, and in Brazil to the Atlantic coast in Pará state. It inhabits tropical rainforest between sea level and 500 m (1,600 ft) of elevation.

== Behavior ==
=== Movement ===
The white-browed hawk appears to be sedentary.

=== Feeding ===
The white-browed hawk hunts near the forest floor. Its diet has not been studied but it has been observed taking a snake and a lizard and is thought to also feed on frogs and large insects.

=== Breeding ===
The white-browed hawk's breeding biology is almost unknown. The one described nest was in western Brazil in December and was thought to hold eggs. It was a small platform of sticks, twigs, and leaves placed in the subcanopy about 15 m (50 ft) above the ground.

=== Vocalization ===
The white-browed hawk's call is "a high-pitched rather thin downslurred whistle 'keeeeuw' given at intervals."

== Status ==
The IUCN has assessed the white-browed hawk as being of least concern. It has a large range but its population size is not known and is believed to be decreasing. No immediate threats have been identified. The species is poorly known, "but so much forest in its extensive range remains intact that [the] species can not be considered of immediate concern."
