= Allen's rice rat =

The name Allen's rice rat has been used for the following oryzomyines:

- Sigmodontomys alfari, Alfaro's rice water rat
- Hylaeamys perenensis, Western Amazonian oryzomys
