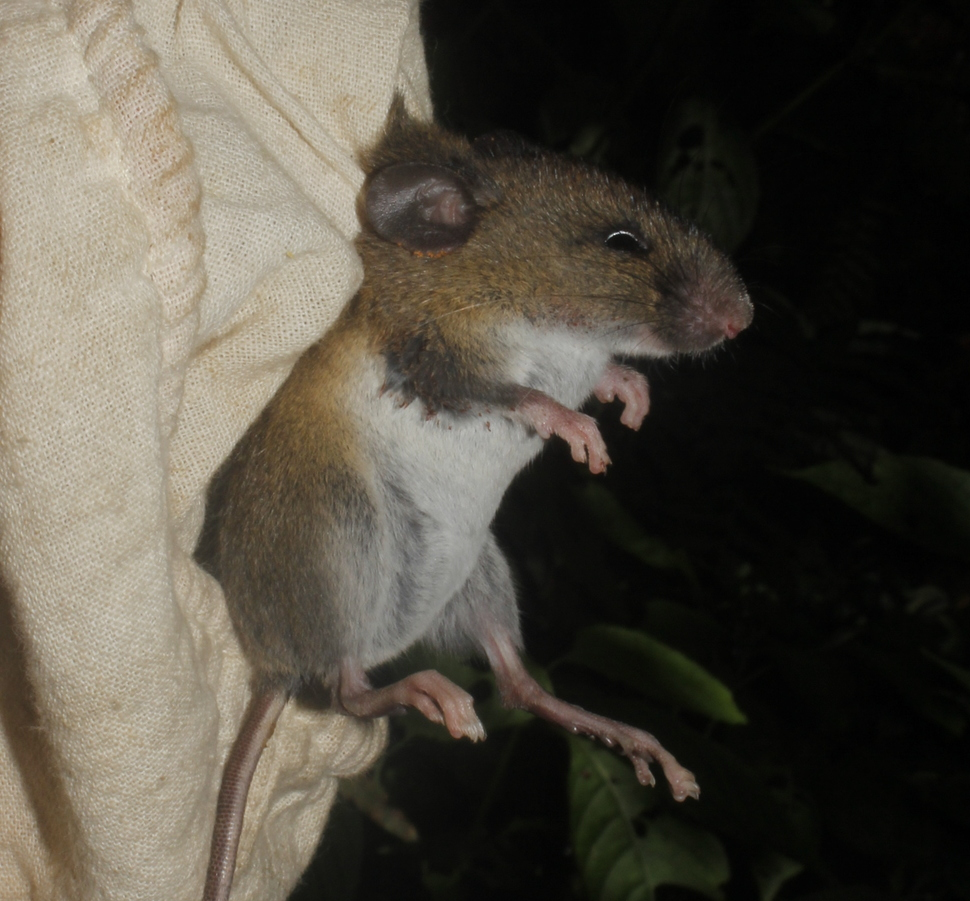

Conservation status
- Vulnerable (IUCN 3.1)

Scientific classification
- Kingdom: Animalia
- Phylum: Chordata
- Class: Mammalia
- Infraclass: Placentalia
- Order: Rodentia
- Family: Cricetidae
- Subfamily: Sigmodontinae
- Genus: Casiomys
- Species: C. chapmani

Binomial name
- Casiomys chapmani (O. Thomas, 1898)

Synonyms
- Oryzomys chapmani O. Thomas, 1898; Oryzomys alfaroi caudatus E. A. Goldman, 1918; Oryzomys alfaroi chapmani Edward Alphonso Goldman, 1918; Oryzomys alfaroi dilutior Edward Alphonso Goldman, 1918; Oryzomys alfaroi huastecae Dalquest, 1951; Oryzomys caudatus Corbet & J. Edwards Hill, 1980; Handleyomys chapmani Weksler, Percequillo, & Voss, 2006

= Chapman's rice rat =

Species of rodent

Casiomys chapmani, also known as Chapman's oryzomys or Chapman's rice rat, is a species of rodent in the genus Casiomys of family Cricetidae. It is found only in Mexico. It was previously placed in the genus Oryzomys as Oryzomys chapmani, but was then provisionally transferred to the genus Handleyomys along with five other species in the "alfaroi group" pending the description of a new genus to contain it. These species were placed in the newly described genus Casiomys in 2024, which contains rodent species that live in the region spanning central Mexico to northwestern South America and have 54 to 64 diploid chromosomes.

Chapman's rice rat was named after Frank Michler Chapman.

== Literature cited ==
- Musser, G. G.; Carleton, M. D. (2005). "Superfamily Muroidea". In Wilson, D. E.; Reeder, D. M. (eds.). Mammal Species of the World: A Taxonomic and Geographic Reference (3rd ed.). Johns Hopkins University Press. pp. 894–1531. ISBN 978-0-8018-8221-0. OCLC 62265494.
- Weksler, M.; Percequillo, A. R.; Voss, R. S. (2006-10-19). "Ten new genera of oryzomyine rodents (Cricetidae: Sigmodontinae)" (PDF). American Museum Novitates (3537): 1–29. doi:10.1206/0003-0082(2006)3537[1:TNGOOR]2.0.CO;2. hdl:2246/5815. S2CID 84088556.
