= Casiomys rhabdops =

Conservation status
- Endangered (IUCN 3.1)

Scientific classification
- Kingdom: Animalia
- Phylum: Chordata
- Class: Mammalia
- Order: Rodentia
- Family: Cricetidae
- Subfamily: Sigmodontinae
- Genus: Casiomys
- Species: C. rhabdops

Binomial name
- Casiomys rhabdops (Merriam, 1901)

Synonyms
- Oryzomys rhabdops Merriam, 1901 [Handleyomys] rhabdops: Weksler, Percequillo, and Voss, 2006

Species of rodent

Casiomys rhabdops, also known as the highland oryzomys or striped rice rat, is a species of rodent in the genus Casiomys of family Cricetidae. It is nocturnal and is found in Guatemala and Mexico in montane forest at elevations from 1250 to 3250 m.
