= Colombian rice rat =

Conservation status
- Least Concern (IUCN 3.1)

Scientific classification
- Kingdom: Animalia
- Phylum: Chordata
- Class: Mammalia
- Order: Rodentia
- Family: Cricetidae
- Subfamily: Sigmodontinae
- Genus: Handleyomys
- Species: H. intectus

Binomial name
- Handleyomys intectus (Thomas, 1921)

Synonyms
- Oryzomys intectus Thomas, 1921

Species of rodent

The Colombian rice rat (Handleyomys intectus), also known as the white-footed Handley's mouse is a species of rodent in the family Cricetidae occurring only in Colombia. It was previously included in Oryzomys, but closely resembles the dusky montane rat, and accordingly both species were placed in the new genus Handleyomys in 2002.

== Description ==
This is a medium-sized rat, with adults measuring 9 to 12 centimetres (3.5 to 4.7 in) in head-body length, with a tail of about the same length, and weighing from 17 to 34 grams (0.60 to 1.20 oz). The fur is soft and brownish-grey over most of the body, gradually fading to a grizzled dark grey on the underparts. Unlike its closest relative, the dusky montane rat, the almost-hairless tail has the same dark colour on both upper and lower surfaces, and unlike most other related species, the female has only six teats, instead of eight. It has no gall bladder.

== Distribution and habitat ==
The Colombian rice rat is found only in the Cordillera Central in northwestern Colombia, from Antioquia Department in the north to Valle del Cauca Department in the south. It inhabits cloud forests and neighbouring cropland and pasture between 1,500 and 2,800 metres (4,900 and 9,200 ft) elevation, an environment that is typically cold but very humid.

== Biology and behaviour ==
The species is nocturnal and travels on the forest floor rather than climbing trees. Little is known of its biology, but young have been identified in both the dry and rainy seasons.
