= Handleyomys melanotis =

Conservation status
- Least Concern (IUCN 3.1)

Scientific classification
- Kingdom: Animalia
- Phylum: Chordata
- Class: Mammalia
- Order: Rodentia
- Family: Cricetidae
- Subfamily: Sigmodontinae
- Genus: Handleyomys
- Species: H. melanotis

Binomial name
- Handleyomys melanotis (Thomas, 1893)

Synonyms
- Oryzomys melanotis Thomas, 1893 [Handleyomys] melanotis: Weksler, Percequillo, and Voss, 2006

Species of rodent

Handleyomys melanotis, also known as the black-eared oryzomys or black-eared rice rat, is a species of rodent in the genus Handleyomys of family Cricetidae. It is found in coastal lowland forest in western Mexico.

== Literature cited ==
- Musser, G. G.; Carleton, M. D. (2005). "Superfamily Muroidea". In Wilson, D. E.; Reeder, D. M. (eds.). Mammal Species of the World: A Taxonomic and Geographic Reference (3rd ed.). Johns Hopkins University Press. pp. 894–1531. ISBN 978-0-8018-8221-0. OCLC 62265494.
