= Handleyomys rostratus =

Conservation status
- Least Concern (IUCN 3.1)

Scientific classification
- Kingdom: Animalia
- Phylum: Chordata
- Class: Mammalia
- Order: Rodentia
- Family: Cricetidae
- Subfamily: Sigmodontinae
- Genus: Handleyomys
- Species: H. rostratus

Binomial name
- Handleyomys rostratus (Merriam, 1901)

Synonyms
- Oryzomys rostratus Merriam, 1901 [Handleyomys] rostratus: Weksler, Percequillo, and Voss, 2006

Species of rodent

Handleyomys rostratus, also known as the long-nosed oryzomys, long-nosed rice rat, or rusty rice rat is a species of rodent in the genus Handleyomys of family Cricetidae. It is found in Belize, El Salvador, Guatemala, Honduras, Mexico, and Nicaragua. It is nocturnal and is found in forests at elevations above sea level to 1200 meters. Handleyomys rostratus attains its highest level of development in south and Central America. High rates of deforestation and habitat destruction are the biggest threat to Handleyomys rostratus.

== Literature cited ==
- Almendra, Ana Laura; González-Cózatl, Francisco X.; Engstrom, Mark D. & Rogers, Duke S. (1 November 2018). "Evolutionary relationships and climatic niche evolution in the genus Handleyomys (Sigmodontinae: Oryzomyini)". Molecular Phylogenetics and Evolution. 128: 12–25. Bibcode:2018MolPE.128...12A. doi:10.1016/j.ympev.2018.06.018. ISSN 1055-7903. PMID 29906608.
- Merriam, Clinton Hart (1901). Synopsis of the Rice Rats (genus Oryzomys) of the United States and Mexico. The Academy.
- Weksler, M.; Percequillo, A. R.; Voss, R. S. (19 October 2006). "Ten new genera of oryzomyine rodents (Cricetidae: Sigmodontinae)". American Museum Novitates (3537). New York: American Museum of Natural History: 1–29. doi:10.1206/0003-0082(2006)3537[1:TNGOOR]2.0.CO;2. hdl:2246/5815. ISSN 0003-0082. S2CID 84088556.
