= Handleyomys saturatior =

Conservation status
- Least Concern (IUCN 3.1)

Scientific classification
- Kingdom: Animalia
- Phylum: Chordata
- Class: Mammalia
- Order: Rodentia
- Family: Cricetidae
- Subfamily: Sigmodontinae
- Genus: Handleyomys
- Species: H. saturatior

Binomial name
- Handleyomys saturatior (Merriam, 1901)
- Handleyomys saturatior range

Synonyms
- Oryzomys saturatior Merriam, 1901 [Handleyomys] saturatior: Weksler, Percequillo, and Voss, 2006

Species of rodent

Handleyomys saturatior, also known as the cloud forest oryzomys or cloud forest rice rat, is a species of rodent in the genus Handleyomys of family Cricetidae. It is found in Belize, El Salvador, Guatemala, Honduras, Mexico, and Nicaragua in cloud forest at elevations from 750 to 2500 m. It was previously placed in the genus Oryzomys.

== Literature cited ==
- Musser, G. G. and M. D. Carleton. 2005. Superfamily Muroidea. pp. 894–1531 in Mammal Species of the World a Taxonomic and Geographic Reference. D. E. Wilson and D. M. Reeder eds. Johns Hopkins University Press, Baltimore.
- Weksler, M.; Percequillo, A. R.; Voss, R. S. (2006). "Ten new genera of oryzomyine rodents (Cricetidae: Sigmodontinae)". American Museum Novitates (3537). New York: American Museum of Natural History: 1–29. doi:10.1206/0003-0082(2006)3537[1:TNGOOR]2.0.CO;2. hdl:2246/5815. ISSN 0003-0082. S2CID 84088556.
