= Hylaeamys oniscus =

Conservation status
- Near Threatened (IUCN 3.1)

Scientific classification
- Kingdom: Animalia
- Phylum: Chordata
- Class: Mammalia
- Order: Rodentia
- Family: Cricetidae
- Subfamily: Sigmodontinae
- Genus: Hylaeamys
- Species: H. oniscus

Binomial name
- Hylaeamys oniscus (Thomas, 1904)

Synonyms
- Oryzomys oniscus Thomas, 1904

Species of rodent

Hylaeamys oniscus, the sowbug rice rat, is a rodent species in the family Cricetidae. It was formerly placed in the genus Oryzomys as Oryzomys oniscus.

It occurs only in northeastern Brazil. It is close to Hylaeamys laticeps, which occurs further south in Brazil, and the two have been considered to be the same species.
