= Hylaeamys tatei =

Conservation status
- Data Deficient (IUCN 3.1)

Scientific classification
- Kingdom: Animalia
- Phylum: Chordata
- Class: Mammalia
- Order: Rodentia
- Family: Cricetidae
- Subfamily: Sigmodontinae
- Genus: Hylaeamys
- Species: H. tatei

Binomial name
- Hylaeamys tatei (Musser, Carleton, Brothers & Gardner, 1998)

Synonyms
- Oryzomys tatei Musser, Carleton, Brothers & Gardner, 1998

Species of rodent

Hylaeamys tatei, commonly known as Tate's oryzomys or Tate's rice rat, is a South American rodent species of the family Cricetidae. It is known only from the eastern foothills of the Andes in central Ecuador, where it has been found at elevations from 1130 to 1520 m. H. tatei is most closely related to H. yunganus, which occurs throughout Amazonia. The species is found in tropical rainforest and is terrestrial and probably nocturnal. It is named after American zoologist George Henry Hamilton Tate.
