= Handleyomys =

- Handleyomys alfaroi skull

Scientific classification
- Kingdom: Animalia
- Phylum: Chordata
- Class: Mammalia
- Infraclass: Placentalia
- Order: Rodentia
- Family: Cricetidae
- Subfamily: Sigmodontinae
- Tribe: Oryzomyini
- Genus: Handleyomys; Voss, Gómez-Laverde, and Pacheco, 2002

Type species
- Aepeomys fuscatus J.A. Allen, 1912

Species
- Handleyomys alfaroi Handleyomys chapmani Handleyomys fuscatus Handleyomys intectus Handleyomys melanotis Handleyomys rhabdops Handleyomys rostratus Handleyomys saturatior

Genus of rodents

Handleyomys is a genus of Central and South American rodents in the tribe Oryzomyini of family Cricetidae. It was first described in 2002 to include two species from the Colombian Andes which were previously included in distinct and unrelated genera, Aepeomys and Oryzomys, but which turned out to be closely related. Later, in 2006, six other species were provisionally added from Oryzomys; these were moved to Casiomys in 2024.

The genus is named after Charles O. Handley Jr., a mammalogist from the National Museum, Smithsonian Institution.

The genus includes the following species:

- Handleyomys alfaroi
- Handleyomys chapmani
- Handleyomys fuscatus
- Handleyomys intectus
- Handleyomys melanotis
- Handleyomys rhabdops
- Handleyomys rostratus
- Handleyomys saturatior
