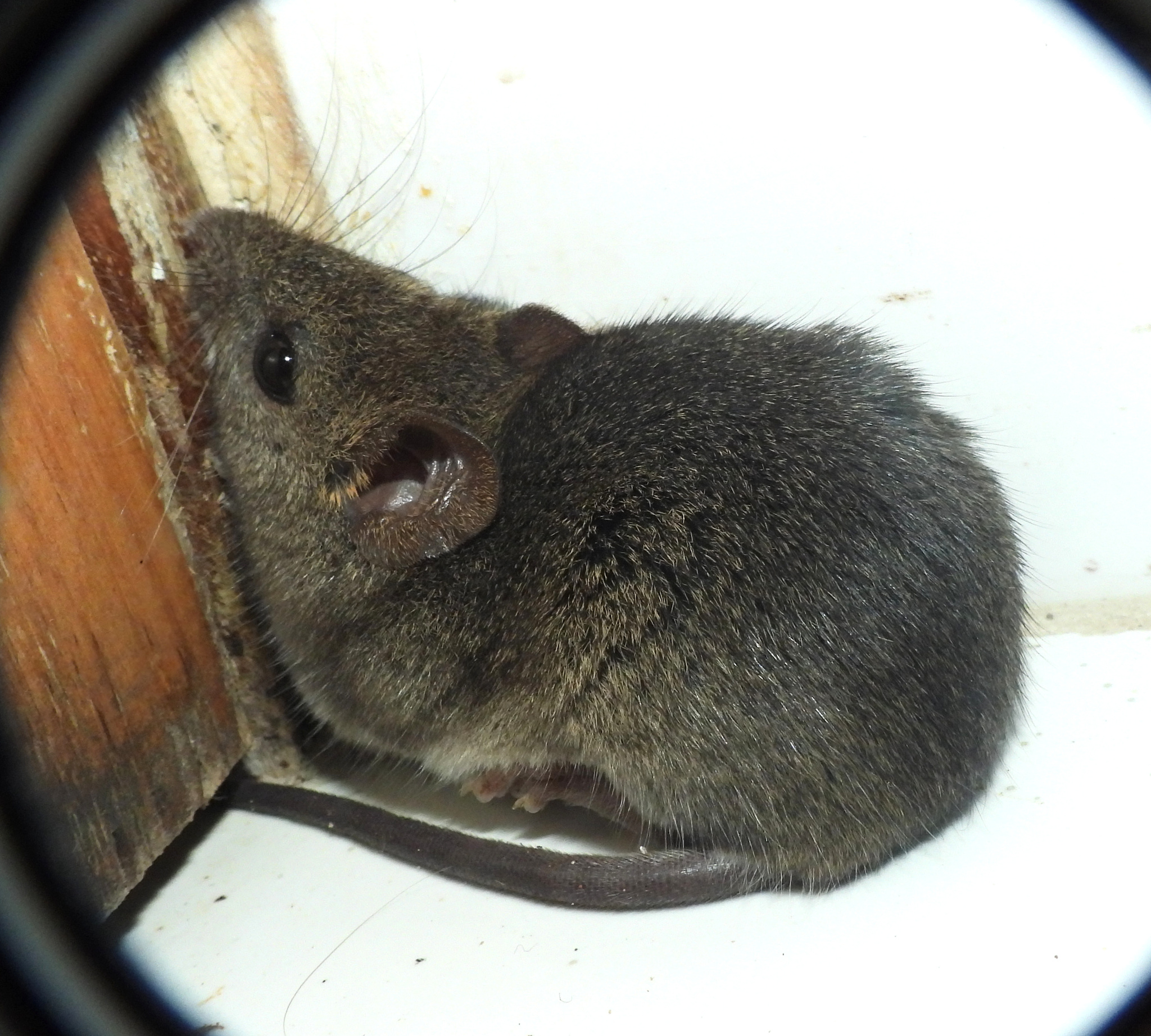
- Hylaeamys megacephalus

Scientific classification
- Kingdom: Animalia
- Phylum: Chordata
- Class: Mammalia
- Infraclass: Placentalia
- Order: Rodentia
- Family: Cricetidae
- Subfamily: Sigmodontinae
- Tribe: Oryzomyini
- Genus: Hylaeamys; Weksler et al., 2006

Type species
- Mus megacephalus Fischer, 1814

Species
- Hylaeamys acritus Hylaeamys laticeps Hylaeamys megacephalus Hylaeamys oniscus Hylaeamys perenensis Hylaeamys tatei Hylaeamys yunganus

= Hylaeamys =

Genus of rodents

Hylaeamys is a genus of South American oryzomyine rodents found principally in humid forested areas east of the Andes. The species in this genus have historically been placed in Oryzomys. They are most closely related to Euryoryzomys, Transandinomys, Nephelomys, Oecomys, and Handleyomys, and most closely resemble species of the former two genera. They are distinguished from members of Euryoryzomys by all-dark or indistinct two-tone tail coloration (as opposed to the distinct two-tone tail coloration of Euryoryzomys), from members of Transandinomys by having shorter whiskers above their eyes that do not extend posteriorly behind their ears, and in both cases by differences in carotid circulation. The genus is named after hylaea ("forest" in Greek), the term used by Humboldt for the lowland South American rainforests that are the main habitat of the genus.

The genus currently comprises the following species:

- Hylaeamys acritus
- Hylaeamys laticeps
- Hylaeamys megacephalus
- Hylaeamys oniscus
- Hylaeamys perenensis
- Hylaeamys tatei
- Hylaeamys yunganus
