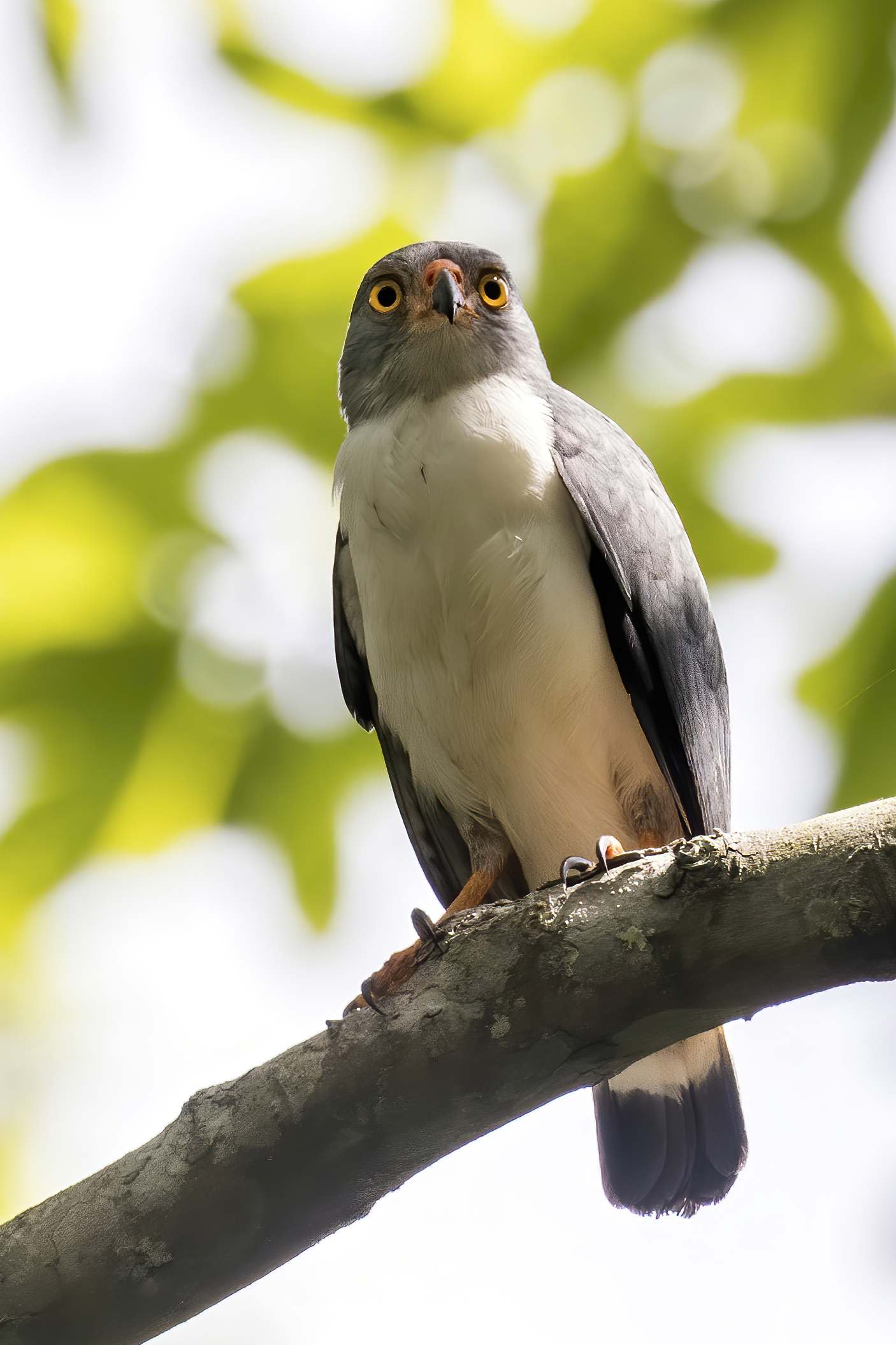
- A semiplumbeous hawk in Panama

Conservation status
- Least Concern (IUCN 3.1)

Scientific classification
- Kingdom: Animalia
- Phylum: Chordata
- Class: Aves
- Order: Accipitriformes
- Family: Accipitridae
- Genus: Leucopternis
- Species: L. semiplumbeus

Binomial name
- Leucopternis semiplumbeus Lawrence, 1861

= Semiplumbeous hawk =

Species of bird

The semiplumbeous hawk (Leucopternis semiplumbeus) is a species of bird of prey in the family Accipitridae. It is found in Colombia, Costa Rica, Ecuador, Honduras, and Panama. Its natural habitat is subtropical or tropical moist lowland forests.

== Morphology ==
The semiplumbeous hawk is a small bird, averaging about 12–13 inches (30–33 cm) in length (approximately the size of a kestrel or merlin). It is dark gray above with white underparts and a white throat. The semiplumbeous hawk is easily identifiable due to its striking orange cere and black face mask. It has bright yellow eyes and its legs and feet are orange to orange-red in color.

== Behavior, hunting, and diet ==
Semiplumbeous hawks are rarely seen in flight. Instead, these hawks typically perch silently on a high branch, waiting for prey. This sit-and-wait strategy of feeding is similar to the feeding behavior of other Leucopternis species. The semiplumbeous hawk often follows swarms of army ants in order to capture antbirds, which, along with other small songbirds, make up a large portion of its diet. It might also feed on bats, lizards and snakes.

During the breeding season, this species is known to be quite vocal and produces a series of loud, piercing upslurred whistles that sound like "kwee...wee...wee...wee...wee." Outside of breeding season, it tends to be more silent, but may occasionally produce a high-pitched, thin upslurred whistle that is repeated at intervals.

== Habitat and distribution ==
Semiplumbeous hawks can be found in the eastern part of Honduras and eastern Nicaragua, as well as in the southern areas of western Colombia (east to Magdalena Valley) and northwest Ecuador (Esmeraldas and northwest Pichincha). There have been several recent reports of semiplumbeous hawks being seen and heard in the Allpahuayo-Mishana National Reserve in northern Peru, which may refer to either this species or a closely related new species.

Semiplumbeous hawks are typically found in humid forests located in tropical and lower subtropical zones. It can be observed in various locations such as forest edges, in and around forest fragments, and in tall second-growth areas throughout Colombia. Although it can be found from sea level up to 1000 m, it is usually present in elevations below 500 m. It has been reported up to 1600 m in altitude in one instance.

== Population and research ==
Semiplumbeous hawks is currently categorized as "Least Concern" in terms of global threat level and is listed under CITES II, but was previously classified as "Near Threatened." Despite being considered locally common in some primary forest areas and being able to tolerate tall second-growth forest. The overall population of semiplumbeous hawks is small – estimated at 1,000 to 10,000 mature birds – and declining. This is likely due to deforestation and habitat fragmentation. Its entire range spans an area of less than 300,000 km^{2}, and the global population is estimated to be between 1,000 and 10,000 individuals.

Like other members of its genus Leucopternis, it is very poorly known and there is much to be learned about the biology and population ecology of this species.

== Gallery ==
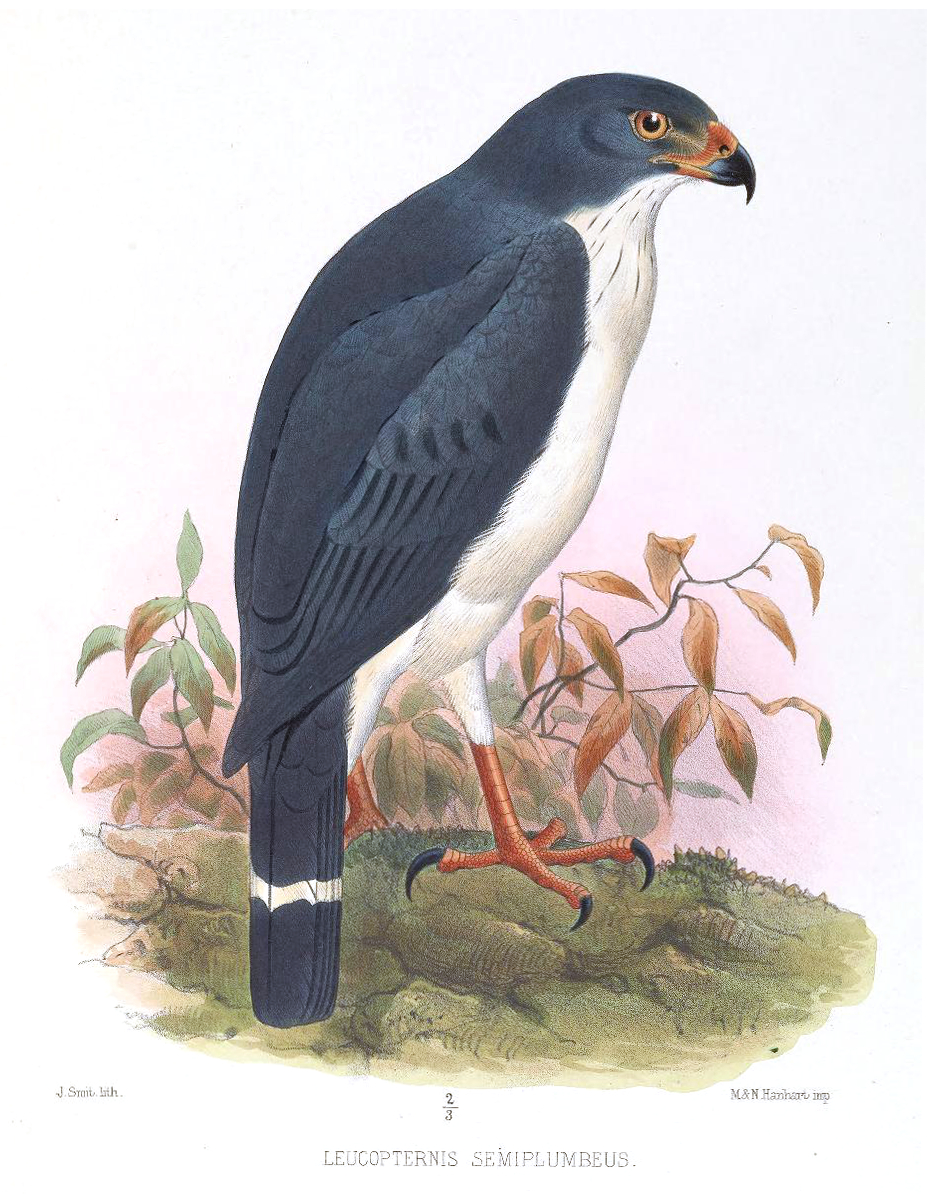
Leucopternis semiplumbeus (1869), Joseph Smit

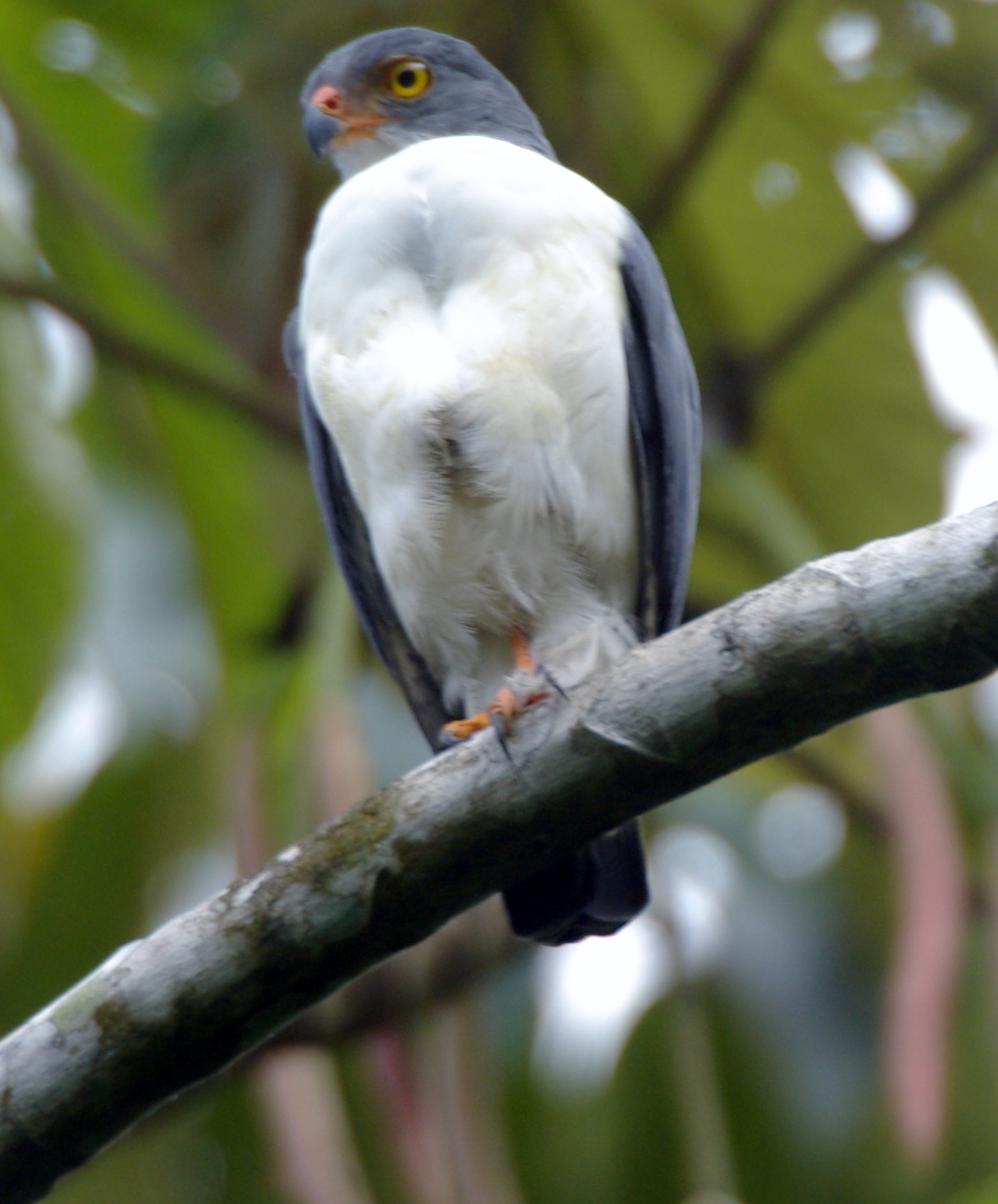
