= Squamae =

Tubercles resembling scales

In some rodents, squamae are small tubercles resembling scales on the sole of the hindfeet. Among oryzomyine rodents, their development is variable; most have well-developed squamae, but in others they are indistinct or entirely absent. Delomys sublineatus and Peromyscus maniculatus also have squamae.

== Literature cited ==
- Voss, R.S., Gómez-Laverde, M. and Pacheco, V. 2002. A new genus for Aepeomys fuscatus Allen, 1912, and Oryzomys intectus Thomas, 1921: Enigmatic muroid rodents from Andean cloud forests. American Museum Novitates 3373:1–42.
- Weksler, M. 2006. Phylogenetic relationships of oryzomyine rodents (Muroidea: Sigmodontinae): separate and combined analyses of morphological and molecular data. Bulletin of the American Museum of Natural History 296:1–149.
- Weksler, M.; Percequillo, A. R.; Voss, R. S. (2006-10-19). "Ten new genera of oryzomyine rodents (Cricetidae: Sigmodontinae)" (PDF). American Museum Novitates (3537). American Museum of Natural History: 1–29. doi:10.1206/0003-0082(2006)3537[1:TNGOOR]2.0.CO;2. hdl:2246/5815.
