= Hylaeamys laticeps =

Conservation status
- Vulnerable (IUCN 3.1)

Scientific classification
- Kingdom: Animalia
- Phylum: Chordata
- Class: Mammalia
- Order: Rodentia
- Family: Cricetidae
- Subfamily: Sigmodontinae
- Genus: Hylaeamys
- Species: H. laticeps

Binomial name
- Hylaeamys laticeps (Lund, 1840)

Synonyms
- Mus laticeps Lund, 1840; Oryzomys laticeps (Lund, 1840); Hylaeamys seuanezi (Weksler, Geise & Cerqueira, 1999); Oryzomys seuanezi Weksler, Geise & Cerqueira, 1999

Species of rodent

Hylaeamys laticeps, commonly known as the Atlantic Forest oryzomys or the large-headed rice rat, is a species of rodent in the family Cricetidae.

The rodent is endemic to the Atlantic Forest region of southeastern Brazil.

The taxonomic history of Hylaeamys laticeps has been complex, and the name laticeps has been used for various members of the genera Cerradomys, Euryoryzomys, Transandinomys and Hylaeamys at different times. Until 2006, it was classified in the genus Oryzomys as Oryzomys laticeps. The species Oryzomys seuanezi is now a junior synonym of H. laticeps.
