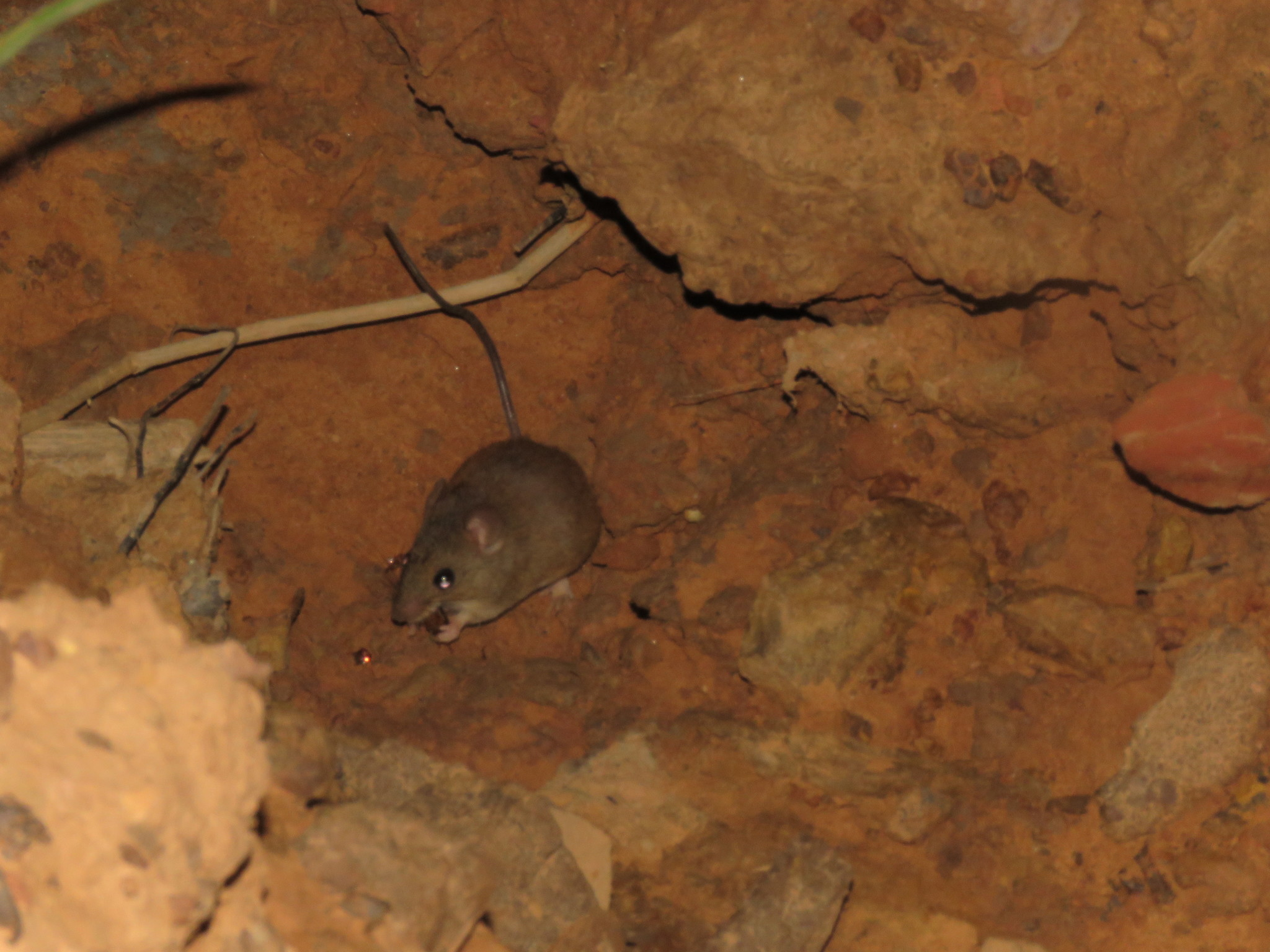

Conservation status
- Least Concern (IUCN 3.1)

Scientific classification
- Kingdom: Animalia
- Phylum: Chordata
- Class: Mammalia
- Order: Rodentia
- Family: Cricetidae
- Subfamily: Sigmodontinae
- Genus: Hylaeamys
- Species: H. perenensis

Binomial name
- Hylaeamys perenensis (J.A. Allen, 1901)

Synonyms
- Oryzomys perenensis J.A. Allen, 1901

= Hylaeamys perenensis =

Species of rodent

Hylaeamys perenensis, commonly known as the western Amazonian oryzomys, is an oryzomyine rodent of the family Cricetidae.

It is found in western Amazonia (southeastern Colombia, eastern Ecuador, eastern Peru, northern Bolivia, and western Brazil).

It has an omnivorous diet and is nocturnal, terrestrial, and nonsocial. It is commonly found along rivers.
