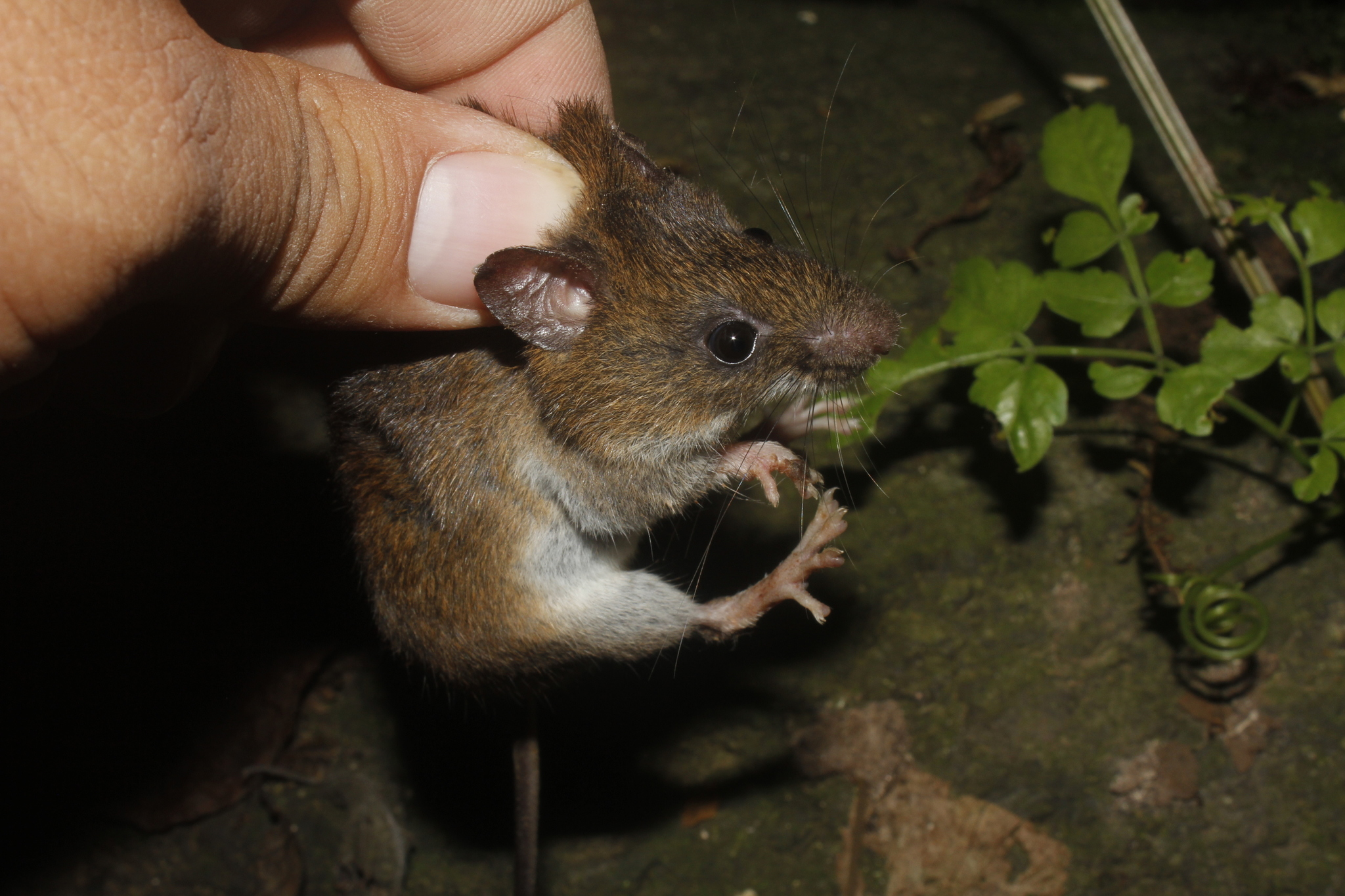

Conservation status
- Least Concern (IUCN 3.1)

Scientific classification
- Kingdom: Animalia
- Phylum: Chordata
- Class: Mammalia
- Order: Rodentia
- Family: Cricetidae
- Subfamily: Sigmodontinae
- Genus: Handleyomys
- Species: H. alfaroi

Binomial name
- Handleyomys alfaroi (Allen, 1891)

Synonyms
- Oryzomys alfaroi Allen, 1891

= Handleyomys alfaroi =

Species of rodent

Handleyomys alfaroi, also known as Alfaro's rice rat or Alfaro's oryzomys, is a species of rodent in the genus Handleyomys of family Cricetidae. It is found in Belize, Colombia, Costa Rica, Ecuador, El Salvador, Guatemala, Honduras, Mexico, Nicaragua, and Panama. It was previously included in Oryzomys as Oryzomys alfaroi. Its natural habitats are subtropical and tropical lowland or montane dry forests at elevations ranging from sea level to 2500 m.

== Literature cited ==
- Weksler, M.; Percequillo, A. R.; Voss, R. S. (19 October 2006). "Ten new genera of oryzomyine rodents (Cricetidae: Sigmodontinae)". American Museum Novitates (3537). New York: American Museum of Natural History: 1–29. doi:10.1206/0003-0082(2006)3537[1:TNGOOR]2.0.CO;2. hdl:2246/5815. ISSN 0003-0082. S2CID 84088556.
