= List of sigmodontines =

Species in mammal subfamily Sigmodontinae

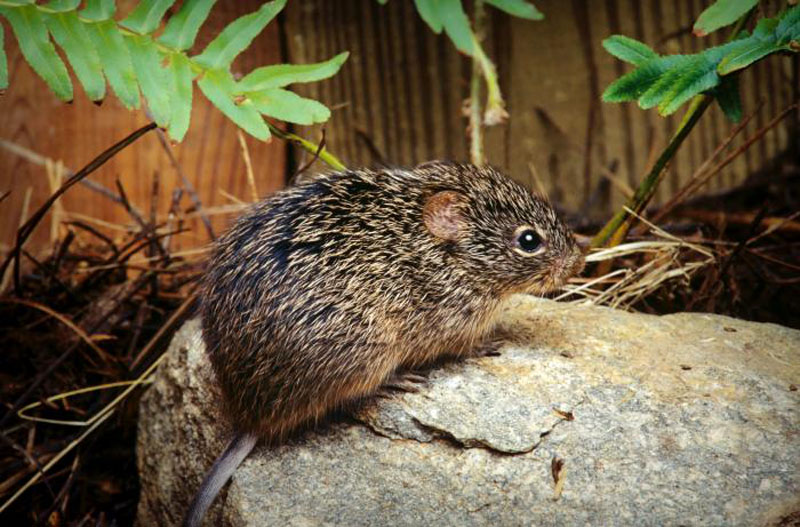
Hispid cotton rat (Sigmodon hispidus)

Sigmodontinae is a subfamily of mammals in the rodent family Cricetidae, which in turn is part of the Myomorpha suborder in the order Rodentia. Members of this subfamily are called sigmodontines or New World rats and mice and include grass mice and rice rats. They are found in South America and southern North America, primarily in forests, shrublands, and grasslands, though some species can be found in rocky areas and wetlands. They range in size from the small vesper mouse, at 5 cm (2 in) plus a 4 cm (2 in) tail, to the Magdalena water rat, at 29 cm (11 in) plus a 27 cm (11 in) tail. Sigmodontines generally eat vegetation, seeds, and insects, though some also eat fungi, crustaceans, or small fish. No sigmodontines have population estimates, but thirteen species are categorized as endangered, and two species—the fossorial giant rat and Zuniga's dark rice rat—are categorized as critically endangered. Ten species, including the genera Megalomys, Megaoryzomys, and Noronhomys, were driven extinct after 1500 due to the European colonization of the Americas and introduction of non-native rats, with some species surviving until the 1900s.

The 385 extant species of Sigmodontinae are divided into 84 genera, ranging in size from 1 to 42 species. Several extinct prehistoric sigmodontine species have been discovered, though due to ongoing research and discoveries, the exact number and categorization are not fixed.

== Conventions ==
IUCN Red List categories
Conservation status
- EX: Extinct (10 species)
- EW: Extinct in the wild (0 species)
- CR: Critically endangered (2 species)
- EN: Endangered (13 species)
- VU: Vulnerable (27 species)
- NT: Near threatened (13 species)
- LC: Least concern (266 species)

Other categories
- DD: Data deficient (59 species)
- NE: Not evaluated (5 species)

The author citation for the species or genus is given after the scientific name; parentheses around the author citation indicate that this was not the original taxonomic placement. Conservation status codes listed follow the International Union for Conservation of Nature (IUCN) Red List of Threatened Species. Range maps are provided wherever possible; if a range map is not available, a description of the sigmodontine's range is provided. Ranges are based on the IUCN Red List for that species unless otherwise noted. All extinct species, subspecies, or genera listed alongside extant species went extinct after 1500 CE, and are indicated by a dagger symbol: "†".

== Classification ==
Sigmodontinae is a subfamily of the rodent family Cricetidae consisting of 385 extant species in 84 genera. These genera range in size from 1 to 42 species. Additionally, ten species, including the genera Megalomys, Megaoryzomys, and Noronhomys, were driven extinct after 1500 due to the European colonization of the Americas and introduction of non-native rats, with some species surviving until the 1900s. This does not include hybrid species or extinct prehistoric species.

Subfamily Sigmodontinae

- Genus Abrawayaomys (Ruschi's rat): one species
- Genus Abrothrix (soft-haired mice): eight species
- Genus Aegialomys (Galápagos rice rats): two species
- Genus Aepeomys (montane mice): two species
- Genus Akodon (grass mice): thirty-nine species
- Genus Amphinectomys (Ucayali water rat): one species
- Genus Andalgalomys (chaco mice): two species
- Genus Andinomys (Andean mouse): one species
- Genus Anotomys (aquatic rat): one species
- Genus Auliscomys (big-eared mice): three species
- Genus Bibimys (crimson-nosed rats): three species
- Genus Blarinomys (Brazilian shrew mouse): one species
- Genus Brucepattersonius (brucies): seven species
- Genus Calomys (vesper mice): thirteen species
- Genus Casiomys (Casio rice rats): six species
- Genus Cerradomys (Cerrado rice rats): four species
- Genus Chelemys (long-clawed mice): two species
- Genus Chibchanomys (water mice): two species
- Genus Chilomys (Colombian forest mouse): one species
- Genus Chinchillula (Altiplano chinchilla mouse): one species
- Genus Delomys (Atlantic Forest rats): three species
- Genus Deltamys (Kemp's grass mouse): one species
- Genus Drymoreomys (White-throated montane forest rat): one species
- Genus Eligmodontia (gerbil mice): four species
- Genus Eremoryzomys (gray rice rat): one species
- Genus Euneomys (chinchilla mice): four species
- Genus Euryoryzomys (broad rice rats): six species
- Genus Galenomys (Garlepp's mouse): one species
- Genus Geoxus (long-clawed mole mice): two species
- Genus Graomys (gray leaf-eared mice): four species
- Genus Gyldenstolpia (fossorial giant rat): one species
- Genus Handleyomys (Handley's rice rats): two species
- Genus Holochilus (marsh rats): three species
- Genus Hylaeamys (forest rice rats): eight species
- Genus Ichthyomys (crab-eating rats): four species
- Genus Irenomys (Chilean climbing mouse): one species
- Genus Juliomys (Atlantic Forest tree mice): two species
- Genus Juscelinomys (Brazilian burrowing mice): two species (one extinct)
- Genus Kunsia (woolly giant rat): one species
- Genus Lenoxus (Andean rat): one species
- Genus Loxodontomys (big-eared mice): two species
- Genus Lundomys (Lund's amphibious rat): one species
- Genus Megalomys † (pilories): two species (two extinct)
- Genus Megaoryzomys † (Galápagos giant rat): one species (one extinct)
- Genus Melanomys (dark rice rats): three species
- Genus Microakodontomys (transitional colilargo): one species
- Genus Microryzomys (colilargos): two species
- Genus Mindomys (Hammond's rice rat): one species
- Genus Neacomys (bristly mice): eight species
- Genus Necromys (bolo mice): nine species
- Genus Nectomys (water rats): five species
- Genus Neomicroxus (small grass mice): two species
- Genus Neotomys (Andean swamp rat): one species
- Genus Nephelomys (misty rice rats): seven species
- Genus Nesoryzomys (Galápagos mice): five species (two extinct)
- Genus Neusticomys (fish-eating rats): six species
- Genus Noronhomys † (Vespucci's rodent): one species (one extinct)
- Genus Notiomys (Edwards's long-clawed mouse): one species
- Genus Oecomys (arboreal rice rats): fifteen species
- Genus Oligoryzomys (pygmy rice rats): nineteen species (one extinct)
- Genus Oreoryzomys (Peruvian rice rat): one species
- Genus Oryzomys (rice rats): six species (two extinct)
- Genus Oxymycterus (hocicudos): seventeen species
- Genus Phaenomys (Rio de Janeiro arboreal rat): one species
- Genus Phyllotis (leaf-eared mice): sixteen species
- Genus Podoxymys (Roraima mouse): one species
- Genus Pseudoryzomys (Brazilian false rice rat): one species
- Genus Punomys (puna mice): two species
- Genus Reithrodon (bunny rats): two species
- Genus Rhagomys (arboreal mice): two species
- Genus Rheomys (water mice): four species
- Genus Rhipidomys (climbing mice): twenty-two species
- Genus Salinomys (delicate salt flat mouse): one species
- Genus Scapteromys (swamp rats): two species
- Genus Scolomys (spiny mice): two species
- Genus Sigmodon (cotton rats): fourteen species
- Genus Sigmodontomys (Alfaro's rice water rat): one species
- Genus Sooretamys (rat-headed rice rat): one species
- Genus Tanyuromys (Harris's rice water rat): one species
- Genus Tapecomys (primordial tapecua): one species
- Genus Thalpomys (cerrado mice): two species
- Genus Thaptomys (blackish grass mouse): one species
- Genus Thomasomys (Oldfield mice): forty-two species
- Genus Transandinomys (transandean rice rats): two species
- Genus Wiedomys (red-nosed mice): two species
- Genus Wilfredomys (Greater Wilfred's mouse): one species
- Genus Zygodontomys (cane mice): two species

- Sigmodontinae
  - - Ichthyomyini
      - Anotomys
      - - - Rheomys
          - Ichthyomys
        - - Chibchanomys
          - Neusticomys
    - Sigmodontini
      Sigmodon
  - - - Thomasomyini
        - Aepeomys
        - Chilomys
        - Rhagomys
        - - Rhipidomys
          - Thomasomys
    - - Neomicroxus
      - - - Reithrodontini
            Reithrodon
        - - Abrawayaomys
          - Chinchillula
        - - Akodontini
            - - - - Gyldenstolpia
                  - Kunsia
                - Scapteromys
              - - Bibimys
                - - Lenoxus
                  - - Blarinomys
                    - Brucepattersonius
            - - - Juscelinomys
                - Oxymycterus
              - - - Thaptomys
                  - - Necromys
                    - - Podoxymys
                      - Thalpomys
                - - Akodon
                  - Deltamys
      - - Oryzomyini
          - Scolomys
          - Zygodontomys
          - - - - Casiomys
                - Handleyomys
              - - Nephelomys
                - - Hylaeamys
                  - - Oecomys
                    - - Euryoryzomys
                      - Transandinomys
            - - - Microakodontomys
                - Oligoryzomys
                - - Neacomys
                  - - Microryzomys
                    - Oreoryzomys
              - - - Drymoreomys
                  - Eremoryzomys
                - - Sooretamys
                  - - Cerradomys
                    - - - Holochilus
                        - Lundomys
                        - Pseudoryzomys
                      - - - Amphinectomys
                          - Nectomys
                        - - Oryzomys
                          - Mindomys
                          - - - Aegialomys
                              - Nesoryzomys
                            - - Tanyuromys
                              - - Melanomys
                                - Sigmodontomys
      - - - Andinomyini
            - Andinomys
            - Punomys
          - Euneomyini
            - Irenomys
            - - Euneomys
              - Neotomys
        - - - Delomys
            - - Phyllotini
                - Calomys
                - - Eligmodontia
                  - - Graomys
                    - - - Andalgalomys
                        - Salinomys
                      - - - Auliscomys
                          - Galenomys
                        - - Phyllotis
                          - - Tapecomys
                            - Loxodontomys
          - - Abrotrichini
              - Abrothrix
              - - Chelemys
                - - Notiomys
                  - Geoxus
            - Wiedomyini
              - - Juliomys
                - Phaenomys
              - - Wiedomys
                - Wilfredomys

== Sigmodontines ==
The following classification is based on the taxonomy described by the reference work Mammal Species of the World (2005), with augmentation by generally accepted proposals made since using molecular phylogenetic analysis, as supported by both the IUCN and the American Society of Mammalogists.

Genus Abrawayaomys – Cunha & Cruz, 1979 – one species
Common name	Scientific name and subspecies	Range	Size and ecology	IUCN status and estimated population
Ruschi's rat	A. ruschii Cunha & Cruz, 1979	Southeastern Brazil	Size: 8–14 cm (3–6 in) long, plus 8–15 cm (3–6 in) tail Habitat: Forest Diet: Vegetation, seeds, and insects	LC Unknown

Genus Abrothrix – Waterhouse, 1837 – eight species
Common name	Scientific name and subspecies	Range	Size and ecology	IUCN status and estimated population
Andean Altiplano mouse	A. andinus (Philippi, 1858)	Western South America	Size: 6–10 cm (2–4 in) long, plus 4–7 cm (2–3 in) tail Habitat: Shrubland and grassland Diet: Insects, berries, seeds, and fungi	LC Unknown
Gray grass mouse	A. illuteus Thomas, 1925	Northern Argentina	Size: 11–13 cm (4–5 in) long, plus 8–9 cm (3–4 in) tail Habitat: Forest Diet: Insects, berries, seeds, and fungi	LC Unknown
Jelski's Altiplano mouse	A. jelskii (Thomas, 1894)	Western South America	Size: 9–11 cm (4 in) long, plus 7–8 cm (3 in) tail Habitat: Rocky areas, grassland, and shrubland Diet: Insects, berries, seeds, and fungi	LC Unknown
Long-haired grass mouse	A. longipilis (Waterhouse, 1837)	Southern Chile and southern Argentina	Size: 13–14 cm (5–6 in) long, plus 8–10 cm (3–4 in) tail Habitat: Forest, grassland, shrubland, and inland wetlands Diet: Insects, berries, seeds, and fungi	LC Unknown
Mann's grass mouse	A. manni D'Elía, Teta, Upham, Pardiñas, & Patterson, 2015	Central Chile and western Argentina	Size: About 11 cm (4 in) long, plus about 8 cm (3 in) tail Habitat: Forest Diet: Insects, berries, seeds, and fungi	LC Unknown
Olive grass mouse	A. olivaceus (Waterhouse, 1837)	Chile and southern Argentina	Size: 8–10 cm (3–4 in) long, plus 5–6 cm (2 in) tail Habitat: Shrubland, forest, and grassland Diet: Insects, berries, seeds, and fungi	LC Unknown
Sanborn's grass mouse	A. sanborni (Osgood, 1943)	Southern Chile	Size: 10–12 cm (4–5 in) long, plus 6–9 cm (2–4 in) tail Habitat: Forest Diet: Insects, berries, seeds, and fungi	NT Unknown
Woolly grass mouse	A. lanosus (Thomas, 1897)	Southern Chile and southern Argentina	Size: About 10 cm (4 in) long, plus 6–7 cm (2–3 in) tail Habitat: Forest and shrubland Diet: Insects, berries, seeds, and fungi	LC Unknown

Genus Aegialomys – Weksler, Percequillo, & Voss, 2006 – two species
Common name	Scientific name and subspecies	Range	Size and ecology	IUCN status and estimated population
Galápagos rice rat	A. galapagoensis (Waterhouse, 1839)	Galápagos Islands	Size: 10–16 cm (4–6 in) long, plus 12–18 cm (5–7 in) tail Habitat: Shrubland Diet: Grass, sedges, seeds, fruit, insects, crustaceans, and small fish	VU Unknown
Yellowish rice rat	A. xanthaeolus (Thomas, 1894)	Ecuador and western Peru	Size: 10–11 cm (4 in) long, plus 11–18 cm (4–7 in) tail Habitat: Shrubland, desert, and forest Diet: Grass, sedges, seeds, fruit, insects, crustaceans, and small fish	LC Unknown

Genus Aepeomys – Thomas, 1898 – two species
Common name	Scientific name and subspecies	Range	Size and ecology	IUCN status and estimated population
Olive montane mouse	A. lugens (Thomas, 1896)	Western Venezuela	Size: 11–12 cm (4–5 in) long, plus 11–13 cm (4–5 in) tail Habitat: Grassland, shrubland, and forest Diet: Vegetation, seeds, and insects	LC Unknown
Reig's montane mouse	A. reigi Ochoa G., Aguillera, Pacheco, & Soriano, 2001	Western Venezuela	Size: 10–13 cm (4–5 in) long, plus 11–15 cm (4–6 in) tail Habitat: Forest, shrubland, and grassland Diet: Vegetation, seeds, and insects	VU Unknown

Genus Akodon – Meyen, 1833 – 39 species
Common name	Scientific name and subspecies	Range	Size and ecology	IUCN status and estimated population
Altiplano grass mouse	A. lutescens Allen, 1901	Bolivia and southern Peru	Size: About 8 cm (3 in) long, plus about 6 cm (2 in) tail Habitat: Grassland, forest, and shrubland Diet: Plants and invertebrates	LC Unknown
Azara's grass mouse	A. azarae J. B. Fischer, 1829	Southern South America	Size: 9–10 cm (4 in) long, plus 6–9 cm (2–4 in) tail Habitat: Forest, shrubland, and inland wetlands Diet: Plants and invertebrates	LC Unknown
Bolivian grass mouse	A. boliviensis Meyen, 1833	Western South America	Size: About 9 cm (4 in) long, plus about 7 cm (3 in) tail Habitat: Shrubland and grassland Diet: Plants and invertebrates	LC Unknown
Budin's grass mouse	A. budini (Thomas, 1913)	Southern Bolivia and northern Argentina	Size: 11–12 cm (4–5 in) long, plus 5–9 cm (2–4 in) tail Habitat: Forest Diet: Plants and invertebrates	LC Unknown
Caparaó grass mouse	A. mystax Hershkovitz, 1998	Eastern Brazil	Size: 6–11 cm (2–4 in) long, plus 4–8 cm (2–3 in) tail Habitat: Grassland, shrubland, inland wetlands, and forest Diet: Plants and invertebrates	DD Unknown
Chaco grass mouse	A. toba Thomas, 1921	Central South America	Size: 9–13 cm (4–5 in) long, plus 6–9 cm (2–4 in) tail Habitat: Shrubland Diet: Plants and invertebrates	LC Unknown
Cloud forest grass mouse	A. torques (Thomas, 1917)	Southern Peru	Size: About 10 cm (4 in) long, plus about 9 cm (4 in) tail Habitat: Grassland, shrubland, and forest Diet: Plants and invertebrates	LC Unknown
Cochabamba grass mouse	A. siberiae Myers & Patton, 1989	Bolivia	Size: 9–12 cm (4–5 in) long, plus 7–11 cm (3–4 in) tail Habitat: Forest Diet: Plants and invertebrates	NT Unknown
Colombian grass mouse	A. affinis (Allen, 1912)	Colombia	Size: About 9 cm (4 in) long, plus about 7 cm (3 in) tail Habitat: Forest Diet: Plants and invertebrates	LC Unknown
Cursor grass mouse	A. cursor Winge, 1888	Eastern Brazil	Size: 11–12 cm (4–5 in) long, plus 9–10 cm (4 in) tail Habitat: Forest Diet: Plants and invertebrates	LC Unknown
Day's grass mouse	A. dayi Osgood, 1916	Bolivia	Size: 11–14 cm (4–6 in) long, plus 7–9 cm (3–4 in) tail Habitat: Forest and grassland Diet: Plants and invertebrates	LC Unknown
Dolorous grass mouse	A. dolores Thomas, 1916	Argentina	Size: 10–12 cm (4–5 in) long, plus 7–8 cm (3 in) tail Habitat: Shrubland Diet: Plants and invertebrates	LC Unknown
El Dorado grass mouse	A. orophilus Osgood, 1913	Peru	Size: 9–11 cm (4 in) long, plus 7–10 cm (3–4 in) tail Habitat: Grassland, shrubland, and forest Diet: Plants and invertebrates	LC Unknown
Forest grass mouse	A. sylvanus Thomas, 1921	Southern Bolivia and northern Argentina	Size: 8–12 cm (3–5 in) long, plus 6–9 cm (2–4 in) tail Habitat: Forest and grassland Diet: Plants and invertebrates	LC Unknown
Highland grass mouse	A. aerosus Thomas, 1913	Western South America	Size: 9–12 cm (4–5 in) long, plus 7–9 cm (3–4 in) tail Habitat: Forest and grassland Diet: Plants and invertebrates	LC Unknown
Intelligent grass mouse	A. iniscatus Thomas, 1919	Southern Argentina and southern Chile	Size: About 9 cm (4 in) long, plus about 6 cm (2 in) tail Habitat: Grassland, forest, and shrubland Diet: Plants and invertebrates	LC Unknown
Junín grass mouse	A. juninensis Myers, Patton, & Smith, 1990	Peru	Size: About 10 cm (4 in) long, plus about 6 cm (2 in) tail Habitat: Grassland Diet: Plants and invertebrates	LC Unknown
Koford's grass mouse	A. kofordi Myers & Patton, 1989	Southern Peru	Size: About 10 cm (4 in) long, plus about 8 cm (3 in) tail Habitat: Forest, grassland, rocky areas, and shrubland Diet: Plants and invertebrates	LC Unknown
Lindbergh's grass mouse	A. lindberghi Hershkovitz, 1990	Eastern Brazil	Size: 6–10 cm (2–4 in) long, plus 4–8 cm (2–3 in) tail Habitat: Grassland Diet: Plants and invertebrates	DD Unknown
Molina's grass mouse	A. molinae Contreras, 1968	Argentina	Size: 10–12 cm (4–5 in) long, plus 7–8 cm (3 in) tail Habitat: Shrubland and rocky areas Diet: Plants and invertebrates	LC Unknown
Montane grass mouse	A. montensis Thomas, 1913	Southeastern South America	Size: 10–11 cm (4 in) long, plus 8–9 cm (3–4 in) tail Habitat: Savanna, forest, and inland wetlands Diet: Plants and invertebrates	LC Unknown
Monte grass mouse	A. oenos Thomas, 1897	Argentina	Size: 9–11 cm (4 in) long, plus 6–8 cm (2–3 in) tail Habitat: Grassland and forest Diet: Plants and invertebrates	NE Unknown
Paraná grass mouse	A. paranaensis Christoff, Fagundes, Sbalqueiro, Mattevi, & Yonenaga-Yassuda, 2000	Southeastern South America	Size: 8–13 cm (3–5 in) long, plus 6–10 cm (2–4 in) tail Habitat: Forest Diet: Plants and invertebrates	LC Unknown
Philip Myers's akodont	A. philipmyersi Pardiñas, D'Elía, Cirignoli, & Suárez, 2005	Northeastern Argentina	Size: About 9 cm (4 in) long, plus about 6 cm (2 in) tail Habitat: Shrubland, grassland, and forest Diet: Plants and invertebrates	DD Unknown
Polop's grass mouse	A. polopi Jayat, Ortiz, Salazar-Bravo, Pardiñas, & D'Elía, 2010	Agentina	Size: 7–11 cm (3–4 in) long, plus 5–9 cm (2–4 in) tail Habitat: Grassland Diet: Plants and invertebrates	LC Unknown
Puno grass mouse	A. subfuscus Osgood, 1944	Bolivia and southern Peru	Size: 8–10 cm (3–4 in) long, plus 6–7 cm (2–3 in) tail Habitat: Grassland and forest Diet: Plants and invertebrates	LC Unknown
Reig's grass mouse	A. reigi González, Langguth, & Oliveira, 1998	Uruguay and southern Brazil	Size: 9–13 cm (4–5 in) long, plus 8–10 cm (3–4 in) tail Habitat: Inland wetlands and forest Diet: Plants and invertebrates	LC Unknown
São Paulo grass mouse	A. sanctipaulensis Hershkovitz, 1990	Southern Brazil	Size: 7–10 cm (3–4 in) long, plus 5–8 cm (2–3 in) tail Habitat: Shrubland, grassland, and forest Diet: Plants and invertebrates	DD Unknown
Serra do Mar grass mouse	A. serrensis Thomas, 1902	Southern Brazil	Size: 8–12 cm (3–5 in) long, plus 7–11 cm (3–4 in) tail Habitat: Forest Diet: Plants and invertebrates	LC Unknown
Silent grass mouse	A. surdus Thomas, 1917	Southern Peru	Size: About 11 cm (4 in) long, plus about 8 cm (3 in) tail Habitat: Forest Diet: Plants and invertebrates	VU Unknown
Smoky grass mouse	A. fumeus Thomas, 1902	Bolivia and southern Peru	Size: 9–11 cm (4 in) long, plus 7–10 cm (3–4 in) tail Habitat: Grassland, forest, and shrubland Diet: Plants and invertebrates	LC Unknown
Soft grass mouse	A. mollis Thomas, 1894	Ecuador and Peru	Size: 8–12 cm (3–5 in) long, plus 5–10 cm (2–4 in) tail Habitat: Shrubland and grassland Diet: Plants and invertebrates	LC Unknown
Spegazzini's grass mouse	A. spegazzinii Thomas, 1897	Western Argentina	Size: 6–11 cm (2–4 in) long, plus 4–9 cm (2–4 in) tail Habitat: Grassland and forest Diet: Plants and invertebrates	LC Unknown
Tarija akodont	A. pervalens Thomas, 1925	Southern Bolivia and northern Argentina	Size: About 12 cm (5 in) long, plus about 9 cm (4 in) tail Habitat: Forest and shrubland Diet: Plants and invertebrates	DD Unknown
Thespian grass mouse	A. mimus (Thomas, 1901)	Boliva and southern Peru	Size: About 10 cm (4 in) long, plus about 10 cm (4 in) tail Habitat: Forest Diet: Plants and invertebrates	LC Unknown
Unicolored grass mouse	A. caenosus Thomas, 1918	Southern Bolivia and northern Argentina	Size: 7–10 cm (3–4 in) long, plus 4–8 cm (2–3 in) tail Habitat: Grassland Diet: Plants and invertebrates	DD Unknown
Variable grass mouse	A. varius Thomas, 1902	Bolivia	Size: 10–16 cm (4–6 in) long, plus 8–11 cm (3–4 in) tail Habitat: Forest and shrubland Diet: Plants and invertebrates	DD Unknown
White-bellied grass mouse	A. albiventer Thomas, 1897	Western South America	Size: 8–11 cm (3–4 in) long, plus 6–8 cm (2–3 in) tail Habitat: Grassland Diet: Plants and invertebrates	LC Unknown
White-throated grass mouse	A. simulator Thomas, 1916	Southern Bolivia and northern Argentina	Size: 9–13 cm (4–5 in) long, plus 6–10 cm (2–4 in) tail Habitat: Forest, grassland, and shrubland Diet: Plants and invertebrates	LC Unknown

Genus Amphinectomys – Malygin, 1994 – one species
Common name	Scientific name and subspecies	Range	Size and ecology	IUCN status and estimated population
Ucayali water rat	A. savamis Malygin, 1994	Northern Peru	Size: 18–19 cm (7 in) long, plus 17–21 cm (7–8 in) tail Habitat: Inland wetlands and forest Diet: Unknown	DD Unknown

Genus Andalgalomys – Williams & Mares, 1978 – two species
Common name	Scientific name and subspecies	Range	Size and ecology	IUCN status and estimated population
Olrog's chaco mouse	A. olrogi Williams & Mares, 1978	Northern Argentina	Size: 7–12 cm (3–5 in) long, plus 8–14 cm (3–6 in) tail Habitat: Shrubland Diet: Grass, grain, and mesquite fruit	LC Unknown
Pearson's chaco mouse	A. pearsoni (Myers, 1977)	Southern Bolivia and Paraguay	Size: 8–13 cm (3–5 in) long, plus 9–14 cm (4–6 in) tail Habitat: Grassland Diet: Grass, grain, and mesquite fruit	LC Unknown

Genus Andinomys – Thomas, 1902 – one species
Common name	Scientific name and subspecies	Range	Size and ecology	IUCN status and estimated population
Andean mouse	A. edax Thomas, 1902	Western South America	Size: 13–19 cm (5–7 in) long, plus 10–16 cm (4–6 in) tail Habitat: Grassland and shrubland Diet: Vegetation	LC Unknown

Genus Anotomys – one species
Common name	Scientific name and subspecies	Range	Size and ecology	IUCN status and estimated population
Aquatic rat	A. leander Thomas, 1906	Ecuador and Colombia	Size: 10–13 cm (4–5 in) long, plus 12–16 cm (5–6 in) tail Habitat: Inland wetlands, grassland, and forest Diet: Fish	EN Unknown

Genus Auliscomys – Thomas, 1906 – three species
Common name	Scientific name and subspecies	Range	Size and ecology	IUCN status and estimated population
Andean big-eared mouse	A. sublimis (Thomas, 1900)	Western South America	Size: 9–12 cm (4–5 in) long, plus 4–7 cm (2–3 in) tail Habitat: Shrubland, grassland, and rocky areas Diet: Seeds, vegetation, and lichen	LC Unknown
Bolivian big-eared mouse	A. boliviensis (Waterhouse, 1846)	Western South America	Size: About 13 cm (5 in) long, plus 6–10 cm (2–4 in) tail Habitat: Grassland, rocky areas, inland wetlands, and shrubland Diet: Seeds, vegetation, and lichen	LC Unknown
Painted big-eared mouse	A. pictus (Thomas, 1884)	Western South America	Size: 10–14 cm (4–6 in) long, plus 8–11 cm (3–4 in) tail Habitat: Rocky areas, shrubland, and grassland Diet: Seeds, vegetation, and lichen	LC Unknown

Genus Bibimys – Massoia, 1979 – three species
Common name	Scientific name and subspecies	Range	Size and ecology	IUCN status and estimated population
Chaco crimson-nosed rat	B. chacoensis (Shamel, 1931)	Paraguay and northern Argentina	Size: 9–10 cm (4 in) long, plus 7–8 cm (3 in) tail Habitat: Shrubland and grassland Diet: Grass and seeds	LC Unknown
Large-lipped crimson-nosed rat	B. labiosus (Winge, 1887)	Northeastern Argentina and southern Brazil	Size: 7–9 cm (3–4 in) long, plus 6–8 cm (2–3 in) tail Habitat: Forest Diet: Grass and seeds	LC Unknown
Torres's crimson-nosed rat	B. torresi Massoia, 1979	Eastern Argentina	Size: 9–11 cm (4 in) long, plus 7–8 cm (3 in) tail Habitat: Inland wetlands and grassland Diet: Grass and seeds	VU Unknown

Genus Blarinomys – Thomas, 1896 – one species
Common name	Scientific name and subspecies	Range	Size and ecology	IUCN status and estimated population
Brazilian shrew mouse	B. breviceps (Winge, 1888)	Northeastern Argentina and southern Brazil	Size: 9–13 cm (4–5 in) long, plus 3–6 cm (1–2 in) tail Habitat: Forest Diet: Insects and worms	LC Unknown

Genus Brucepattersonius – Hershkovitz, 1998 – seven species
Common name	Scientific name and subspecies	Range	Size and ecology	IUCN status and estimated population
Arroyo of Paradise brucie	B. paradisus Mares & Braun, 2000	Northeastern Argentina and southern Brazil	Size: 8–12 cm (3–5 in) long, plus 8–11 cm (3–4 in) tail Habitat: Forest and rocky areas Diet: Vegetation, seeds, and insects	DD Unknown
Gray-bellied akodont	B. griserufescens Hershkovitz, 1998	Southeastern Brazil	Size: 9–11 cm (4 in) long, plus 9–12 cm (4–5 in) tail Habitat: Forest Diet: Vegetation, seeds, and insects	DD Unknown
Guaraní akodont	B. guarani Mares & Braun, 2000	Northeastern Argentina and southern Brazil	Size: 8–12 cm (3–5 in) long, plus 8–11 cm (3–4 in) tail Habitat: Forest Diet: Vegetation, seeds, and insects	DD Unknown
Ihering's akodont	B. iheringi (Thomas, 1896)	Northeastern Argentina and southern Brazil	Size: 8–12 cm (3–5 in) long, plus 8–11 cm (3–4 in) tail Habitat: Forest Diet: Vegetation, seeds, and insects	LC Unknown
Misiones akodont	B. misionensis Mares & Braun, 2000	Northeastern Argentina and southern Brazil	Size: 8–12 cm (3–5 in) long, plus 8–11 cm (3–4 in) tail Habitat: Forest Diet: Vegetation, seeds, and insects	DD Unknown
Red-bellied akodont	B. igniventris Hershkovitz, 1998	Southern Brazil	Size: 9–13 cm (4–5 in) long, plus 8–10 cm (3–4 in) tail Habitat: Forest Diet: Vegetation, seeds, and insects	DD Unknown
Soricine brucie	B. soricinus Hershkovitz, 1998	Southern Brazil	Size: 9–13 cm (4–5 in) long, plus 8–10 cm (3–4 in) tail Habitat: Forest Diet: Vegetation, seeds, and insects	DD Unknown

Genus Calomys – Waterhouse, 1837 – thirteen species
Common name	Scientific name and subspecies	Range	Size and ecology	IUCN status and estimated population
Andean vesper mouse	C. lepidus (Thomas, 1884)	Western South America	Size: 6–7 cm (2–3 in) long, plus 3–5 cm (1–2 in) tail Habitat: Rocky areas and grassland Diet: Vegetation and insects	LC Unknown
Bolivian vesper mouse	C. boliviae (Thomas, 1901)	Bolivia and northern Argentina	Size: About 11 cm (4 in) long, plus tail Habitat: Forest Diet: Vegetation and insects	LC Unknown
Caatinga vesper mouse	C. expulsus (Lund, 1841)	Eastern Brazil	Size: 8–12 cm (3–5 in) long, plus 6–9 cm (2–4 in) tail Habitat: Savanna and shrubland Diet: Vegetation and insects	LC Unknown
Crafty vesper mouse	C. callidus (Thomas, 1916)	Northern Argentina	Size: 7–14 cm (3–6 in) long, plus 5–9 cm (2–4 in) tail Habitat: Shrubland Diet: Vegetation and insects	LC Unknown
Córdoba vesper mouse	C. venustus (Thomas, 1894)	Argentina	Size: 6–17 cm (2–7 in) long, plus 4–11 cm (2–4 in) tail Habitat: Grassland and shrubland Diet: Vegetation and insects	LC Unknown
Delicate vesper mouse	C. tener Winge, 1888	Eastern South America	Size: 7–9 cm (3–4 in) long, plus 4–8 cm (2–3 in) tail Habitat: Grassland and shrubland Diet: Vegetation and insects	LC Unknown
Drylands vesper mouse	C. musculinus (Thomas, 1913)	Central and southern South America	Size: 8–10 cm (3–4 in) long, plus 7–9 cm (3–4 in) tail Habitat: Shrubland Diet: Vegetation and insects	LC Unknown
Fecund vesper mouse	C. fecundus (Thomas, 1926)	Bolivia	Size: 9–13 cm (4–5 in) long, plus 5–10 cm (2–4 in) tail Habitat: Forest Diet: Vegetation and insects	LC Unknown
Hummelinck's vesper mouse	C. hummelincki (Husson, 1960)	Northern South America	Size: 5–7 cm (2–3 in) long, plus 4–6 cm (2 in) tail Habitat: Savanna and grassland Diet: Vegetation and insects	LC Unknown
Large vesper mouse	C. callosus Rengger, 1830	Central and eastern South America	Size: 9–13 cm (4–5 in) long, plus 7–11 cm (3–4 in) tail Habitat: Grassland and shrubland Diet: Vegetation and insects	LC Unknown
Peruvian vesper mouse	C. sorellus (Thomas, 1900)	Peru	Size: 7–9 cm (3–4 in) long, plus 4–7 cm (2–3 in) tail Habitat: Grassland, forest, and shrubland Diet: Vegetation and insects	LC Unknown
Small vesper mouse	C. laucha Fischer von Waldheim, 1814	Central and southern South America	Size: 5–7 cm (2–3 in) long, plus 4–6 cm (2 in) tail Habitat: Forest, grassland, and shrubland Diet: Vegetation and insects	LC Unknown
Tocantins vesper mouse	C. tocantinsi Bonvicino, Lima, & Almeida, 2003	Central Brazil	Size: 7–12 cm (3–5 in) long, plus 6–8 cm (2–3 in) tail Habitat: Grassland, shrubland, and forest Diet: Vegetation and insects	LC Unknown

Genus Casiomys – Voss, 2024 – six species
Common name	Scientific name and subspecies	Range	Size and ecology	IUCN status and estimated population
Alfaro's rice rat	C. alfaroi (Allen, 1891)	Mexico, Central America, and northeastern South America	Size: 9–11 cm (4 in) long, plus 8–11 cm (3–4 in) tail Habitat: Forest Diet: Grass, sedges, seeds, fruit, insects, crustaceans, and small fish	LC Unknown
Black-eared rice rat	C. melanotis (Thomas, 1893)	Southern Mexico	Size: 8–12 cm (3–5 in) long, plus 9–14 cm (4–6 in) tail Habitat: Forest Diet: Grass, sedges, seeds, fruit, insects, crustaceans, and small fish	LC Unknown
Chapman's rice rat	C. chapmani (Thomas, 1898)	Southern Mexico	Size: 8–16 cm (3–6 in) long, plus 9–12 cm (4–5 in) tail Habitat: Forest Diet: Grass, sedges, seeds, fruit, insects, crustaceans, and small fish	VU Unknown
Cloud Forest rice rat	C. saturatior (Merriam, 1901)	Southern Mexico and Central America	Size: 9–11 cm (4 in) long, plus 10–13 cm (4–5 in) tail Habitat: Forest Diet: Grass, sedges, seeds, fruit, insects, crustaceans, and small fish	LC Unknown
Long-nosed rice rat	C. rostratus (Merriam, 1901)	Mexico and Central America	Size: 10–14 cm (4–6 in) long, plus 12–15 cm (5–6 in) tail Habitat: Forest Diet: Grass, sedges, seeds, fruit, insects, crustaceans, and small fish	LC Unknown
Striped rice rat	C. rhabdops (Merriam, 1901)	Guatemala	Size: 11–12 cm (4–5 in) long, plus 13–15 cm (5–6 in) tail Habitat: Forest Diet: Grass, sedges, seeds, fruit, insects, crustaceans, and small fish	EN Unknown

Genus Cerradomys – Weksler, Percequillo, & Voss, 2006 – four species
Common name	Scientific name and subspecies	Range	Size and ecology	IUCN status and estimated population
Lindbergh's rice rat	C. scotti (Langguth & Bonvicino, 2002)	Central South America	Size: 12–19 cm (5–7 in) long, plus 14–20 cm (6–8 in) tail Habitat: Shrubland, savanna, and grassland Diet: Vegetation, seeds, and insects	LC Unknown
Maracaju rice rat	C. maracajuensis (Langguth & Bonvicino, 2002)	Central South America	Size: 14–19 cm (6–7 in) long, plus 17–23 cm (7–9 in) tail Habitat: Forest and inland wetlands Diet: Vegetation, seeds, and insects	LC Unknown
Marinho's rice rat	C. marinhus (Bonvicino, 2003)	Eastern Brazil	Size: 15–18 cm (6–7 in) long, plus 19–21 cm (7–8 in) tail Habitat: Shrubland, grassland, and savanna Diet: Vegetation, seeds, and insects	LC Unknown
Terraced rice rat	C. subflavus (Wagner, 1842)	Eastern Brazil	Size: 12–18 cm (5–7 in) long, plus 15–21 cm (6–8 in) tail Habitat: Forest Diet: Vegetation, seeds, and insects	LC Unknown

Genus Chelemys – Thomas, 1903 – two species
Common name	Scientific name and subspecies	Range	Size and ecology	IUCN status and estimated population
Andean long-clawed mouse	C. macronyx (Thomas, 1894)	Southern Chile and southwestern Argentina	Size: 10–15 cm (4–6 in) long, plus 4–7 cm (2–3 in) tail Habitat: Grassland, forest, and shrubland Diet: Arthropods, vegetation, and fungi	LC Unknown
Large long-clawed mouse	C. megalonyx (Waterhouse, 1845)	Central Chile	Size: 10–12 cm (4–5 in) long, plus 5–6 cm (2 in) tail Habitat: Shrubland and forest Diet: Arthropods, vegetation, and fungi	NT Unknown

Genus Chibchanomys – Voss, 1988 – two species
Common name	Scientific name and subspecies	Range	Size and ecology	IUCN status and estimated population
Chibchan water mouse	C. trichotis (Thomas, 1897)	Colombia and western Venezuela	Size: 11–13 cm (4–5 in) long, plus 11–14 cm (4–6 in) tail Habitat: Grassland, inland wetlands, and forest Diet: Aquatic invertebrates and small animals	DD Unknown
Las Cajas water mouse	C. orcesi (Jenkins & Barnett, 1997)	Ecuador and Peru	Size: 10–11 cm (4 in) long, plus 10–13 cm (4–5 in) tail Habitat: Inland wetlands and grassland Diet: Aquatic invertebrates and small animals	DD Unknown

Genus Chilomys – Thomas, 1897 – one species
Common name	Scientific name and subspecies	Range	Size and ecology	IUCN status and estimated population
Colombian forest mouse	C. instans Thomas, 1895	Northwestern South America	Size: 8–10 cm (3–4 in) long, plus 10–13 cm (4–5 in) tail Habitat: Forest Diet: Omnivorous	LC Unknown

Genus Chinchillula – Thomas, 1898 – one species
Common name	Scientific name and subspecies	Range	Size and ecology	IUCN status and estimated population
Altiplano chinchilla mouse	C. sahamae Thomas, 1898	Western South America	Size: 15–17 cm (6–7 in) long, plus 9–11 cm (4 in) tail Habitat: Shrubland and rocky areas Diet: Vegetation	LC Unknown

Genus Delomys – Thomas, 1917 – three species
Common name	Scientific name and subspecies	Range	Size and ecology	IUCN status and estimated population
Montane Atlantic Forest rat	D. collinus Thomas, 1917	Southeastern Brazil	Size: 10–14 cm (4–6 in) long, plus 10–15 cm (4–6 in) tail Habitat: Forest and grassland Diet: Vegetation, seeds, and insects	LC Unknown
Pallid Atlantic Forest rat	D. sublineatus Thomas, 1903	Southern Brazil	Size: 12–15 cm (5–6 in) long, plus 10–13 cm (4–5 in) tail Habitat: Forest Diet: Vegetation, seeds, and insects	LC Unknown
Striped Atlantic Forest rat	D. dorsalis (Hensel, 1872)	Southeastern South America	Size: 10–14 cm (4–6 in) long, plus 10–15 cm (4–6 in) tail Habitat: Forest Diet: Vegetation, seeds, and insects	LC Unknown

Genus Deltamys – Thomas, 1917 – one species
Common name	Scientific name and subspecies	Range	Size and ecology	IUCN status and estimated population
Kemp's grass mouse	D. kempi Thomas, 1917	Southeastern South America	Size: About 10 cm (4 in) long, plus about 8 cm (3 in) tail Habitat: Inland wetlands and grassland Diet: Plants and invertebrates	LC Unknown

Genus Drymoreomys – Percequillo, Weksler, & Costa, 2011 – one species
Common name	Scientific name and subspecies	Range	Size and ecology	IUCN status and estimated population
White-throated montane forest rat	D. albimaculatus Percequillo, Weksler, & Costa, 2011	Southeastern Brazil	Size: 11–15 cm (4–6 in) long, plus 14–18 cm (6–7 in) tail Habitat: Forest Diet: Vegetation, seeds, and insects	NT Unknown

Genus Eligmodontia – F. Cuvier, 1837 – four species
Common name	Scientific name and subspecies	Range	Size and ecology	IUCN status and estimated population
Andean gerbil mouse	E. puerulus (Philippi, 1896)	Western South America	Size: 6–10 cm (2–4 in) long, plus 5–10 cm (2–4 in) tail Habitat: Grassland and shrubland Diet: Grain, vegetation, and insects	LC Unknown
Lowland gerbil mouse	E. typus F. Cuvier, 1837	Argentina and southern Chile	Size: About 9 cm (4 in) long, plus about 10 cm (4 in) tail Habitat: Desert, grassland, and shrubland Diet: Grain, vegetation, and insects	LC Unknown
Monte gerbil mouse	E. moreni (Thomas, 1896)	Northern Argentina	Size: 6–9 cm (2–4 in) long, plus 9–13 cm (4–5 in) tail Habitat: Desert and shrubland Diet: Grain, vegetation, and insects	LC Unknown
Morgan's gerbil mouse	E. morgani Allen, 1901	Argentina and southern Chile	Size: 8–10 cm (3–4 in) long, plus 7–9 cm (3–4 in) tail Habitat: Shrubland and grassland Diet: Grain, vegetation, and insects	LC Unknown

Genus Eremoryzomys – Weksler, Percequillo, & Voss, 2006 – one species
Common name	Scientific name and subspecies	Range	Size and ecology	IUCN status and estimated population
Gray rice rat	E. polius Osgood, 1913	Northern Peru and southern Ecuador	Size: 14–18 cm (6–7 in) long, plus 16–21 cm (6–8 in) tail Habitat: Forest Diet: Vegetation, seeds, and insects	DD Unknown

Genus Euneomys – Coues, 1874 – four species
Common name	Scientific name and subspecies	Range	Size and ecology	IUCN status and estimated population
Biting chinchilla mouse	E. mordax Thomas, 1912	Central Chile and western Argentina	Size: 14–15 cm (6 in) long, plus 7–9 cm (3–4 in) tail Habitat: Grassland Diet: Vegetation	LC Unknown
Burrowing chinchilla mouse	E. fossor Thomas, 1899	Northern Argentina	Size: 14–15 cm (6 in) long, plus 7–9 cm (3–4 in) tail Habitat: Shrubland Diet: Vegetation	DD Unknown
Patagonian chinchilla mouse	E. chinchilloides (Waterhouse, 1839)	Southern Chile	Size: 7–16 cm (3–6 in) long, plus 4–9 cm (2–4 in) tail Habitat: Forest and shrubland Diet: Vegetation	DD Unknown
Peterson's chinchilla mouse	E. petersoni Allen, 1903	Southern Argentina and southern Chile	Size: 7–16 cm (3–6 in) long, plus 4–9 cm (2–4 in) tail Habitat: Rocky areas, grassland, and shrubland Diet: Vegetation	LC Unknown

Genus Euryoryzomys – Weksler, Percequillo, & Voss, 2006 – six species
Common name	Scientific name and subspecies	Range	Size and ecology	IUCN status and estimated population
Big-headed rice rat	E. legatus (Thomas, 1925)	Southern Boliva and northern Argentina (in yellow)	Size: 12–16 cm (5–6 in) long, plus 13–17 cm (5–7 in) tail Habitat: Forest Diet: Grass, sedges, seeds, fruit, insects, crustaceans, and small fish	LC Unknown
Elegant rice rat	E. nitidus (Thomas, 1884)	Western South America	Size: 10–17 cm (4–7 in) long, plus 11–16 cm (4–6 in) tail Habitat: Forest Diet: Grass, sedges, seeds, fruit, insects, crustaceans, and small fish	LC Unknown
Emmons' rice rat	E. emmonsae (Musser, Brothers, Gardner, & Carleton, 1998)	Central Brazil	Size: 12–15 cm (5–6 in) long, plus 14–16 cm (6 in) tail Habitat: Forest Diet: Grass, sedges, seeds, fruit, insects, crustaceans, and small fish	DD Unknown
MacConnell's rice rat	E. macconnelli (Thomas, 1910)	Northern South America	Size: 13–17 cm (5–7 in) long, plus 12–18 cm (5–7 in) tail Habitat: Forest Diet: Grass, sedges, seeds, fruit, insects, crustaceans, and small fish	LC Unknown
Monster rice rat	E. lamia (Thomas, 1901)	Central Brazil (in purple)	Size: 14–17 cm (6–7 in) long, plus 13–16 cm (5–6 in) tail Habitat: Forest and savanna Diet: Grass, sedges, seeds, fruit, insects, crustaceans, and small fish	VU Unknown
Russet rice rat	E. russatus (Wagner, 1848)	Southeastern South America (in blue)	Size: 9–18 cm (4–7 in) long, plus 9–19 cm (4–7 in) tail Habitat: Forest Diet: Grass, sedges, seeds, fruit, insects, crustaceans, and small fish	LC Unknown

Genus Galenomys – Thomas, 1916 – one species
Common name	Scientific name and subspecies	Range	Size and ecology	IUCN status and estimated population
Garlepp's mouse	G. garleppi (Thomas, 1898)	Western South America	Size: 10–14 cm (4–6 in) long, plus 3–5 cm (1–2 in) tail Habitat: Grassland Diet: Seeds, vegetation, and lichen	DD Unknown

Genus Geoxus – Thomas, 1919 – two species
Common name	Scientific name and subspecies	Range	Size and ecology	IUCN status and estimated population
Long-clawed mole mouse	G. valdivianus (Philippi, 1858)	Southern Chile and southern Argentina	Size: 9–11 cm (4 in) long, plus 3–5 cm (1–2 in) tail Habitat: Forest and shrubland Diet: Worms, insects, and other arthropods	LC Unknown
Pearson's long-clawed akodont	G. annectens (Patterson, 2003)	Central Chile	Size: 10–13 cm (4–5 in) long, plus 7–9 cm (3–4 in) tail Habitat: Forest Diet: Worms, insects, and other arthropods	VU Unknown

Genus Graomys – Thomas, 1916 – four species
Common name	Scientific name and subspecies	Range	Size and ecology	IUCN status and estimated population
Central leaf-eared mouse	G. chacoensis Thomas, 1902	South-central South America	Size: About 14 cm (6 in) long, plus about 16 cm (6 in) tail Habitat: Forest and grassland Diet: Grass, grain, and mesquite fruit	DD Unknown
Edith's leaf-eared mouse	G. edithae Thomas, 1919	Northern Argentina	Size: About 11 cm (4 in) long, plus about 13 cm (5 in) tail Habitat: Grassland Diet: Grass, grain, and mesquite fruit	DD Unknown
Gray leaf-eared mouse	G. griseoflavus Waterhouse, 1837	Central and southern South America	Size: 11–17 cm (4–7 in) long, plus 13–18 cm (5–7 in) tail Habitat: Shrubland Diet: Grass, grain, and mesquite fruit	LC Unknown
Pale leaf-eared mouse	G. domorum (Thomas, 1902)	Southern Bolivia and northern Argentina	Size: 10–15 cm (4–6 in) long, plus 14–17 cm (6–7 in) tail Habitat: Forest and grassland Diet: Grass, grain, and mesquite fruit	LC Unknown

Genus Gyldenstolpia – Pardiñas & D'Elía & Teta, 2009 – one species
Common name	Scientific name and subspecies	Range	Size and ecology	IUCN status and estimated population
Fossorial giant rat	G. fronto (Winge, 1888)	Southern Paraguay and northern Argentina	Size: About 22 cm (9 in) long, plus about 11 cm (4 in) tail Habitat: Inland wetlands and savanna Diet: Vegetation, seeds, and insects	CR Unknown

Genus Handleyomys – Voss, Gómez-Laverde, and Pacheco, 2002 – two species
Common name	Scientific name and subspecies	Range	Size and ecology	IUCN status and estimated population
Colombian rice rat	H. intectus (Thomas, 1921)	Northwestern Colombia	Size: 8–12 cm (3–5 in) long, plus 7–11 cm (3–4 in) tail Habitat: Forest Diet: Vegetation, seeds, and insects	LC Unknown
Dusky-footed Handley's mouse	H. fuscatus (Allen, 1912)	Northwestern Colombia	Size: 8–13 cm (3–5 in) long, plus 7–11 cm (3–4 in) tail Habitat: Forest Diet: Vegetation, seeds, and insects	LC Unknown

Genus Holochilus – Brandt, 1835 – three species
Common name	Scientific name and subspecies	Range	Size and ecology	IUCN status and estimated population
Amazonian marsh rat	H. sciureus Wagner, 1842	Northern South America	Size: 13–18 cm (5–7 in) long, plus 12–17 cm (5–7 in) tail Habitat: Grassland and inland wetlands Diet: Marsh plants and mollusks	LC Unknown
Brazilian marsh rat	H. brasiliensis (Desmarest, 1819)	Southeastern South America	Size: 14–24 cm (6–9 in) long, plus 16–24 cm (6–9 in) tail Habitat: Inland wetlands and forest Diet: Marsh plants and mollusks	LC Unknown
Chacoan marsh rat	H. chacarius Thomas, 1906	Central South America	Size: 14–20 cm (6–8 in) long, plus 14–19 cm (6–7 in) tail Habitat: Inland wetlands and shrubland Diet: Marsh plants and mollusks	LC Unknown

Genus Hylaeamys – Weksler, Percequillo, & Voss, 2006 – eight species
Common name	Scientific name and subspecies	Range	Size and ecology	IUCN status and estimated population
Atlantic Forest rice rat	H. seuanezi (Lund, 1840)	Southeastern Brazil	Size: 12–18 cm (5–7 in) long, plus 10–16 cm (4–6 in) tail Habitat: Forest Diet: Vegetation, seeds, and insects	NE Unknown
Atlantic Forest oryzomys	H. laticeps (Lund, 1840)	Southeastern Brazil	Size: 12–18 cm (5–7 in) long, plus 10–16 cm (4–6 in) tail Habitat: Forest Diet: Vegetation, seeds, and insects	VU Unknown
Azara's broad-headed oryzomys	H. megacephalus (Fischer von Waldheim, 1814)	Central and northern South America	Size: 8–16 cm (3–6 in) long, plus 9–14 cm (4–6 in) tail Habitat: Forest Diet: Vegetation, seeds, and insects	LC Unknown
Bolivian rice rat	H. acritus (Emmons & Patton, 2005)	Northern Bolivia and western Brazil	Size: 13–16 cm (5–6 in) long, plus 11–13 cm (4–5 in) tail Habitat: Forest and savanna Diet: Vegetation, seeds, and insects	DD Unknown
Sowbug rice rat	H. oniscus (Thomas, 1904)	Eastern Brazil	Size: 14–17 cm (6–7 in) long, plus 13–17 cm (5–7 in) tail Habitat: Forest Diet: Vegetation, seeds, and insects	NT Unknown
Tate's rice rat	H. tatei (Musser, Brothers, Gardner, & Carleton, 1998)	Ecuador	Size: 11–14 cm (4–6 in) long, plus 12–19 cm (5–7 in) tail Habitat: Forest Diet: Vegetation, seeds, and insects	DD Unknown
Western Amazonian rice rat	H. perenensis (Allen, 1901)	Western South America	Size: 8–17 cm (3–7 in) long, plus 9–16 cm (4–6 in) tail Habitat: Forest, grassland, and inland wetlands Diet: Vegetation, seeds, and insects	LC Unknown
Yungas rice rat	H. yunganus (Thomas, 1902)	Central and northern South America	Size: 11–15 cm (4–6 in) long, plus 10–13 cm (4–5 in) tail Habitat: Forest Diet: Vegetation, seeds, and insects	LC Unknown

Genus Ichthyomys – Thomas, 1893 – four species
Common name	Scientific name and subspecies	Range	Size and ecology	IUCN status and estimated population
Crab-eating rat	I. hydrobates (Winge, 1891)	Northwestern South America	Size: 13–19 cm (5–7 in) long, plus 12–15 cm (5–6 in) tail Habitat: Inland wetlands and forest Diet: Fish, crabs, and aquatic insects	LC Unknown
Pittier's crab-eating rat	I. pittieri Handley & Mondolfi, 1963	Northern Venezuela	Size: 9–18 cm (4–7 in) long, plus 8–15 cm (3–6 in) tail Habitat: Inland wetlands and forest Diet: Fish, crabs, and aquatic insects	NT Unknown
Stolzmann's crab-eating rat	I. stolzmanni Thomas, 1893	Ecuador and Peru	Size: About 16 cm (6 in) long, plus 17–19 cm (7 in) tail Habitat: Forest and inland wetlands Diet: Fish, crabs, and aquatic insects	DD Unknown
Tweedy's crab-eating rat	I. tweedii Anthony, 1921	Ecuador	Size: 14–20 cm (6–8 in) long, plus 13–16 cm (5–6 in) tail Habitat: Inland wetlands and forest Diet: Fish, crabs, and aquatic insects	DD Unknown

Genus Irenomys – Thomas, 1919 – one species
Common name	Scientific name and subspecies	Range	Size and ecology	IUCN status and estimated population
Chilean climbing mouse	I. tarsalis (Philippi, 1900)	Southern Chile and southwestern Argentina	Size: 10–13 cm (4–5 in) long, plus 16–20 cm (6–8 in) tail Habitat: Shrubland and forest Diet: Fruit, seeds, and vegetation	LC Unknown

Genus Juliomys – González, 2000 – two species
Common name	Scientific name and subspecies	Range	Size and ecology	IUCN status and estimated population
Lesser Wilfred's mouse	J. pictipes Osgood, 1933	Southern Brazil and northeastern Argentina	Size: 9–11 cm (4 in) long, plus 8–12 cm (3–5 in) tail Habitat: Forest Diet: Vegetation, seeds, and insects	LC Unknown
Montane red-rumped tree mouse	J. rimofrons Oliveira & Bonvicino, 2002	Southeastern Brazil	Size: 8–10 cm (3–4 in) long, plus 9–13 cm (4–5 in) tail Habitat: Forest Diet: Vegetation, seeds, and insects	NT Unknown

Genus Juscelinomys – Oliveira, 1965 – two species
Common name	Scientific name and subspecies	Range	Size and ecology	IUCN status and estimated population
Candango mouse †	J. candango Oliveira, 1965	Central Brazil	Size: Unknown Habitat: Unknown Diet: Vegetation and insects	EX 0
Huanchaca mouse	J. huanchacae Emmons, 1999	Northeastern Bolivia and western Brazil	Size: 13–20 cm (5–8 in) long, plus 8–10 cm (3–4 in) tail Habitat: Grassland and savanna Diet: Vegetation and insects	DD Unknown

Genus Kunsia – Hershkovitz, 1966 – one species
Common name	Scientific name and subspecies	Range	Size and ecology	IUCN status and estimated population
Woolly giant rat	K. tomentosus Lichtenstein, 1830	Northern Bolivia and western Brazil	Size: 18–29 cm (7–11 in) long, plus 14–20 cm (6–8 in) tail Habitat: Grassland Diet: Roots and grass	LC Unknown

Genus Lenoxus – Thomas, 1909 – one species
Common name	Scientific name and subspecies	Range	Size and ecology	IUCN status and estimated population
Andean rat	L. apicalis (Allen, 1900)	Southern Peru and western Bolivia	Size: 11–17 cm (4–7 in) long, plus 13–19 cm (5–7 in) tail Habitat: Forest Diet: Vegetation, seeds, and insects	LC Unknown

Genus Loxodontomys – Osgood, 1947 – two species
Common name	Scientific name and subspecies	Range	Size and ecology	IUCN status and estimated population
Pikumche pericote	L. pikumche Spotorno, Cofré, Manríquez, Vilina, Walker, & Marquet, 1998	Central Chile	Size: 9–15 cm (4–6 in) long, plus 8–12 cm (3–5 in) tail Habitat: Shrubland Diet: Vegetation, fungi, and flowers	LC Unknown
Southern big-eared mouse	L. micropus (Waterhouse, 1837)	Southern Chile and southwestern Argentina	Size: 9–15 cm (4–6 in) long, plus 8–12 cm (3–5 in) tail Habitat: Shrubland Diet: Vegetation, fungi, and flowers	LC Unknown

Genus Lundomys – Voss & Carleton, 1993 – one species
Common name	Scientific name and subspecies	Range	Size and ecology	IUCN status and estimated population
Lund's amphibious rat	L. molitor Winge, 1887	Uruguay and southern Brazil	Size: 17–24 cm (7–9 in) long, plus 19–29 cm (7–11 in) tail Habitat: Inland wetlands, forest, and grassland Diet: Vegetation	LC Unknown

Genus Megalomys † – Trouessart, 1881 – two species
Common name	Scientific name and subspecies	Range	Size and ecology	IUCN status and estimated population
Desmarest's pilorie †	M. desmarestii (Fischer von Waldheim, 1829)	Martinique	Size: Unknown Habitat: Unknown Diet: Unknown	EX 0
Saint Lucia pilorie †	M. luciae (Forsyth Major, 1901)	St. Lucia	Size: Unknown Habitat: Unknown Diet: Unknown	EX 0

Genus Megaoryzomys † – Lenglet & Coppois, 1979 – one species
Common name	Scientific name and subspecies	Range	Size and ecology	IUCN status and estimated population
Galápagos giant rat †	M. curioi Niethammer, 1964	Santa Cruz Island of the Galápagos Islands	Size: Unknown Habitat: Shrubland Diet: Unknown	EX 0

Genus Melanomys – Thomas, 1902 – three species
Common name	Scientific name and subspecies	Range	Size and ecology	IUCN status and estimated population
Dusky rice rat	M. caliginosus (Tomes, 1860)	Central America and northwestern South America	Size: 10–14 cm (4–6 in) long, plus 7–12 cm (3–5 in) tail Habitat: Forest Diet: Grass, sedges, seeds, fruit, insects, crustaceans, and small fish	LC Unknown
Robust dark rice rat	M. robustulus (Thomas, 1914)	Ecuador	Size: About 12 cm (5 in) long, plus about 9 cm (4 in) tail Habitat: Forest Diet: Grass, sedges, seeds, fruit, insects, crustaceans, and small fish	LC Unknown
Zuniga's dark rice rat	M. zunigae (Sanborn, 1949)	Southwestern Peru	Size: Unknown length, plus 8–11 cm (3–4 in) tail Habitat: Shrubland and desert Diet: Grass, sedges, seeds, fruit, insects, crustaceans, and small fish	CR Unknown

Genus Microakodontomys – Hershkovitz, 1993 – one species
Common name	Scientific name and subspecies	Range	Size and ecology	IUCN status and estimated population
Transitional colilargo	M. transitorius Hershkovitz, 1993	Central Brazil	Size: About 7 cm (3 in) long, plus about 9 cm (4 in) tail Habitat: Shrubland and grassland Diet: Vegetation, seeds, and insects	EN Unknown

Genus Microryzomys – Thomas, 1917 – two species
Common name	Scientific name and subspecies	Range	Size and ecology	IUCN status and estimated population
Montane colilargo	M. minutus (Tomes, 1860)	Northwestern South America	Size: 6–10 cm (2–4 in) long, plus 11–13 cm (4–5 in) tail Habitat: Rocky areas, grassland, and forest Diet: Seeds and vegetation	LC Unknown
Páramo colilargo	M. altissimus (Osgood, 1933)	Ecuador and Peru	Size: 6–10 cm (2–4 in) long, plus 10–14 cm (4–6 in) tail Habitat: Grassland Diet: Seeds and vegetation	LC Unknown

Genus Mindomys – Weksler, Percequillo, & Voss, 2006 – one species
Common name	Scientific name and subspecies	Range	Size and ecology	IUCN status and estimated population
Hammond's rice rat	M. hammondi Thomas, 1913	Ecuador	Size: 17–29 cm (7–11 in) long, plus 22–25 cm (9–10 in) tail Habitat: Forest Diet: Grass, sedges, seeds, fruit, insects, crustaceans, and small fish	EN Unknown

Genus Neacomys – Thomas, 1900 – eight species
Common name	Scientific name and subspecies	Range	Size and ecology	IUCN status and estimated population
Common bristly mouse	N. spinosus Thomas, 1882	Western and central South America	Size: 7–11 cm (3–4 in) long, plus 8–13 cm (3–5 in) tail Habitat: Forest Diet: Seeds, insects, and fruit	LC Unknown
Dubost's bristly mouse	N. dubosti Voss, Lunde, & Simmons, 2001	Northeastern South America	Size: 6–9 cm (2–4 in) long, plus 7–10 cm (3–4 in) tail Habitat: Forest Diet: Seeds, insects, and fruit	LC Unknown
Guiana bristly mouse	N. guianae Thomas, 1905	Northern South America	Size: 6–9 cm (2–4 in) long, plus 6–9 cm (2–4 in) tail Habitat: Forest Diet: Seeds, insects, and fruit	LC Unknown
Musser's bristly mouse	N. musseri Patton, Silva, & Malcolm, 2000	Eastern Peru and western Brazil	Size: 6–7 cm (2–3 in) long, plus 6–9 cm (2–4 in) tail Habitat: Forest Diet: Seeds, insects, and fruit	LC Unknown
Narrow-footed bristly mouse	N. tenuipes Thomas, 1900	Northwestern South America	Size: 7–10 cm (3–4 in) long, plus 7–11 cm (3–4 in) tail Habitat: Forest Diet: Seeds, insects, and fruit	LC Unknown
Painted bristly mouse	N. pictus Goldman, 1912	Eastern Panama	Size: 6–9 cm (2–4 in) long, plus 7–9 cm (3–4 in) tail Habitat: Forest Diet: Seeds, insects, and fruit	DD Unknown
Paracou bristly mouse	N. paracou Voss, Lunde, & Simmons, 2001	Northern South America	Size: 7–9 cm (3–4 in) long, plus 6–9 cm (2–4 in) tail Habitat: Forest Diet: Seeds, insects, and fruit	LC Unknown
Small bristly mouse	N. minutus Patton, Silva, & Malcolm, 2000	Western Brazil	Size: 6–8 cm (2–3 in) long, plus 7–9 cm (3–4 in) tail Habitat: Forest Diet: Seeds, insects, and fruit	LC Unknown

Genus Necromys – Ameghino, 1889 – nine species
Common name	Scientific name and subspecies	Range	Size and ecology	IUCN status and estimated population
Argentine bolo mouse	N. benefactus (Thomas, 1919)	Northeastern Argentina	Size: 11–14 cm (4–6 in) long, plus 5–10 cm (2–4 in) tail Habitat: Grassland and shrubland Diet: Arthropods	LC Unknown
Dark bolo mouse	N. obscurus (Waterhouse, 1837)	Uruguay and eastern Argentina	Size: 10–13 cm (4–5 in) long, plus 5–8 cm (2–3 in) tail Habitat: Inland wetlands and grassland Diet: Arthropods	LC Unknown
Hairy-tailed bolo mouse	N. lasiurus (Lund, 1841)	Central and eastern South America	Size: 11–14 cm (4–6 in) long, plus 5–10 cm (2–4 in) tail Habitat: Savanna, forest, and grassland Diet: Arthropods	LC Unknown
Northern grass mouse	N. urichi (Allen & Chapman, 1897)	Northern South America	Size: 10–15 cm (4–6 in) long, plus 6–11 cm (2–4 in) tail Habitat: Forest Diet: Arthropods	LC Unknown
Paraguayan bolo mouse	N. lenguarum (Thomas, 1898)	West-central South America	Size: 11–14 cm (4–6 in) long, plus 5–10 cm (2–4 in) tail Habitat: Shrubland, savanna, and grassland Diet: Arthropods	LC Unknown
Pleasant bolo mouse	N. amoenus (Thomas, 1900)	Western South America	Size: 9–11 cm (4 in) long, plus 6–8 cm (2–3 in) tail Habitat: Shrubland and grassland Diet: Arthropods	LC Unknown
Rufous-bellied bolo mouse	N. lactens (Thomas, 1918)	Bolivia and northern Argentina	Size: 9–13 cm (4–5 in) long, plus 6–9 cm (2–4 in) tail Habitat: Shrubland and grassland Diet: Arthropods	LC Unknown
Spotted bolo mouse	N. punctulatus (Thomas, 1894)	Colombia and Ecuador	Size: About 13 cm (5 in) long, plus about 7 cm (3 in) tail Habitat: Unknown Diet: Arthropods	DD Unknown
Temchuk's bolo mouse	N. temchuki (Massoia, 1980)	Northeastern Argentina	Size: 11–14 cm (4–6 in) long, plus 5–10 cm (2–4 in) tail Habitat: Grassland and forest Diet: Arthropods	LC Unknown

Genus Nectomys – Peters, 1861 – five species
Common name	Scientific name and subspecies	Range	Size and ecology	IUCN status and estimated population
Common water rat	N. rattus (Pelzeln, 1883)	Central and northern South America	Size: 12–29 cm (5–11 in) long, plus 12–25 cm (5–10 in) tail Habitat: Grassland, forest, savanna, shrubland, and inland wetlands Diet: Vegetation, insects, tadpoles, and small fish	LC Unknown
Magdalena water rat	N. magdalenae Thomas, 1897	Colombia	Size: 18–29 cm (7–11 in) long, plus 19–27 cm (7–11 in) tail Habitat: Inland wetlands, forest, and grassland Diet: Vegetation, insects, tadpoles, and small fish	DD Unknown
South American water rat	N. squamipes (Brants, 1827)	Eastern South America	Size: 11–26 cm (4–10 in) long, plus 12–29 cm (5–11 in) tail Habitat: Inland wetlands Diet: Vegetation, insects, tadpoles, and small fish	LC Unknown
Trinidad water rat	N. palmipes Allen & Chapman, 1893	Eastern Venezuela and Trinidad and Tobago	Size: 15–25 cm (6–10 in) long, plus 14–23 cm (6–9 in) tail Habitat: Inland wetlands and forest Diet: Vegetation, insects, tadpoles, and small fish	LC Unknown
Western Amazonian water rat	N. apicalis Peters, 1861	Western South America	Size: 14–27 cm (6–11 in) long, plus 16–27 cm (6–11 in) tail Habitat: Inland wetlands, forest, and grassland Diet: Vegetation, insects, tadpoles, and small fish	LC Unknown

Genus Neomicroxus – Alvarado-Serrano and D'Elía, 2013 – two species
Common name	Scientific name and subspecies	Range	Size and ecology	IUCN status and estimated population
Bogotá grass mouse	N. bogotensis Thomas, 1895	Colombia and Western Venezuela	Size: 7–9 cm (3–4 in) long, plus 6–8 cm (2–3 in) tail Habitat: Forest and grassland Diet: Vegetation, seeds, and insects	LC Unknown
Ecuadorian grass mouse	N. latebricola Thomas, 1895	Ecuador	Size: 7–11 cm (3–4 in) long, plus 6–10 cm (2–4 in) tail Habitat: Shrubland, grassland, and forest Diet: Vegetation, seeds, and insects	EN Unknown

Genus Neotomys – Thomas, 1894 – one species
Common name	Scientific name and subspecies	Range	Size and ecology	IUCN status and estimated population
Andean swamp rat	N. ebriosus Thomas, 1894	Western South America	Size: 9–15 cm (4–6 in) long, plus 6–9 cm (2–4 in) tail Habitat: Inland wetlands, shrubland, and grassland Diet: Vegetation, seeds, and insects	LC Unknown

Genus Nephelomys – Weksler, Percequillo, & Voss, 2006 – seven species
Common name	Scientific name and subspecies	Range	Size and ecology	IUCN status and estimated population
Boquete rice rat	N. devius (Bangs, 1902)	Costa Rica and Panama	Size: 15–17 cm (6–7 in) long, plus 18–20 cm (7–8 in) tail Habitat: Forest Diet: Grass, sedges, seeds, fruit, insects, crustaceans, and small fish	LC Unknown
Caracol rice rat	N. caracolus (Thomas, 1914)	Northern Venezuela	Size: About 14 cm (6 in) long, plus about 16 cm (6 in) tail Habitat: Forest Diet: Grass, sedges, seeds, fruit, insects, crustaceans, and small fish	LC Unknown
Ecuadorian rice rat	N. auriventer (Thomas, 1899)	Ecuador	Size: 14–18 cm (6–7 in) long, plus 16–20 cm (6–8 in) tail Habitat: Forest and grassland Diet: Grass, sedges, seeds, fruit, insects, crustaceans, and small fish	LC Unknown
Keays's rice rat	N. keaysi (Allen, 1900)	Southern Peru and Bolivia	Size: 12–17 cm (5–7 in) long, plus 14–21 cm (6–8 in) tail Habitat: Forest Diet: Grass, sedges, seeds, fruit, insects, crustaceans, and small fish	LC Unknown
Light-footed rice rat	N. levipes (Thomas, 1902)	Southern Peru and Bolivia	Size: 11–17 cm (4–7 in) long, plus 14–19 cm (6–7 in) tail Habitat: Forest Diet: Grass, sedges, seeds, fruit, insects, crustaceans, and small fish	LC Unknown
Mérida rice rat	N. meridensis (Thomas, 1894)	Western Venezuela	Size: 13–16 cm (5–6 in) long, plus 17–18 cm (7 in) tail Habitat: Forest Diet: Grass, sedges, seeds, fruit, insects, crustaceans, and small fish	LC Unknown
Tomes's rice rat	N. albigularis (Tomes, 1860)	Panama and Northwestern South America	Size: 10–17 cm (4–7 in) long, plus 13–19 cm (5–7 in) tail Habitat: Forest Diet: Grass, sedges, seeds, fruit, insects, crustaceans, and small fish	LC Unknown

Genus Nesoryzomys – Heller, 1904 – five species
Common name	Scientific name and subspecies	Range	Size and ecology	IUCN status and estimated population
Darwin's Galápagos mouse †	N. darwini Osgood, 1929	Santa Cruz Island of the Galápagos Islands	Size: Unknown Habitat: Forest and shrubland Diet: Grass, sedges, seeds, fruit, insects, crustaceans, and small fish	EX 0
Fernandina Galápagos mouse	N. fernandinae Hutterer & Hirsch, 1979	Fernandina Island of the Galápagos Islands	Size: 10–13 cm (4–5 in) long, plus 7–10 cm (3–4 in) tail Habitat: Shrubland and forest Diet: Grass, sedges, seeds, fruit, insects, crustaceans, and small fish	VU Unknown
Indefatigable Galápagos mouse †	N. indefessus (Thomas, 1899)	Galápagos Islands	Size: Unknown Habitat: Shrubland Diet: Grass, sedges, seeds, fruit, insects, crustaceans, and small fish	EX 0
Large Fernandina Galápagos mouse	N. narboroughi Heller, 1904	Fernandina Island of the Galápagos Islands	Size: 11–18 cm (4–7 in) long, plus 10–16 cm (4–6 in) tail Habitat: Forest and shrubland Diet: Grass, sedges, seeds, fruit, insects, crustaceans, and small fish	VU Unknown
Santiago Galápagos mouse	N. swarthi Orr, 1938	Santiago Island of the Galápagos Islands	Size: 11–19 cm (4–7 in) long, plus 10–17 cm (4–7 in) tail Habitat: Shrubland and grassland Diet: Grass, sedges, seeds, fruit, insects, crustaceans, and small fish	VU Unknown

Genus Neusticomys – Anthony, 1921 – six species
Common name	Scientific name and subspecies	Range	Size and ecology	IUCN status and estimated population
Ferreira's fish-eating rat	N. ferreirai (Percequillo, Carmignotto, & Silva, 2005)	Central Brazil	Size: 10–12 cm (4–5 in) long, plus 7–10 cm (3–4 in) tail Habitat: Forest Diet: Aquatic invertebrates	DD Unknown
Montane fish-eating rat	N. monticolus Anthony, 1921	Colombia and Ecuador	Size: 9–21 cm (4–8 in) long, plus 8–12 cm (3–5 in) tail Habitat: Inland wetlands and forest Diet: Aquatic invertebrates	LC Unknown
Musso's fish-eating rat	N. mussoi Ochoa G. & Soriano, 1991	Western Venezuela	Size: 9–12 cm (4–5 in) long, plus 7–9 cm (3–4 in) tail Habitat: Forest and inland wetlands Diet: Aquatic invertebrates	VU Unknown
Oyapock's fish-eating rat	N. oyapocki Dubost & Petter, 1978	Northwestern South America	Size: 9–12 cm (4–5 in) long, plus 6–9 cm (2–4 in) tail Habitat: Forest, inland wetlands, and savanna Diet: Aquatic invertebrates	DD Unknown
Peruvian fish-eating rat	N. peruviensis Musser & Gardner, 1974	Southern Peru	Size: 11–14 cm (4–6 in) long, plus 9–11 cm (4 in) tail Habitat: Forest and inland wetlands Diet: Aquatic invertebrates	LC Unknown
Venezuelan fish-eating rat	N. venezuelae Anthony, 1929	Northern South America	Size: 10–14 cm (4–6 in) long, plus 10–12 cm (4–5 in) tail Habitat: Inland wetlands and forest Diet: Aquatic invertebrates	VU Unknown

Genus Noronhomys † – Olson & Carleton, 1999 – one species
Common name	Scientific name and subspecies	Range	Size and ecology	IUCN status and estimated population
Vespucci's rodent †	N. vespuccii Olson & Carleton, 1999	Fernando de Noronha islands northeast of Brazil	Size: Unknown Habitat: Shrubland Diet: Vegetation, seeds, and insects	EX 0

Genus Notiomys – Thomas, 1890 – one species
Common name	Scientific name and subspecies	Range	Size and ecology	IUCN status and estimated population
Edwards's long-clawed mouse	N. edwardsii (Thomas, 1890)	Southern Argentina	Size: 8–12 cm (3–5 in) long, plus 3–5 cm (1–2 in) tail Habitat: Shrubland, grassland, and rocky areas Diet: Insects and seeds	LC Unknown

Genus Oecomys – Thomas, 1906 – fifteen species
Common name	Scientific name and subspecies	Range	Size and ecology	IUCN status and estimated population
Atlantic Forest arboreal rice rat	O. catherinae Thomas, 1909	Eastern South America	Size: 12–14 cm (5–6 in) long, plus 14–17 cm (6–7 in) tail Habitat: Grassland, shrubland, savanna, and inland wetlands Diet: Grass, sedges, seeds, fruit, insects, crustaceans, and small fish	LC Unknown
Bicolored arboreal rice rat	O. bicolor (Tomes, 1860)	Central and northern South America and Panama	Size: 9–11 cm (4 in) long, plus 9–12 cm (4–5 in) tail Habitat: Forest Diet: Grass, sedges, seeds, fruit, insects, crustaceans, and small fish	LC Unknown
Brazilian arboreal rice rat	O. paricola Thomas, 1904	Central South America	Size: 10–12 cm (4–5 in) long, plus 11–14 cm (4–6 in) tail Habitat: Forest Diet: Grass, sedges, seeds, fruit, insects, crustaceans, and small fish	DD Unknown
Cleber's arboreal rice rat	O. cleberi Locks, 1981	Southern Brazil	Size: 8–12 cm (3–5 in) long, plus 8–13 cm (3–5 in) tail Habitat: Inland wetlands and forest Diet: Grass, sedges, seeds, fruit, insects, crustaceans, and small fish	DD Unknown
Dusky arboreal rice rat	O. phaeotis (Thomas, 1901)	Southern Peru	Size: 10–12 cm (4–5 in) long, plus 10–13 cm (4–5 in) tail Habitat: Forest Diet: Grass, sedges, seeds, fruit, insects, crustaceans, and small fish	LC Unknown
Foothill arboreal rice rat	O. superans Thomas, 1911	Western South America	Size: 13–17 cm (5–7 in) long, plus 15–19 cm (6–7 in) tail Habitat: Forest Diet: Grass, sedges, seeds, fruit, insects, crustaceans, and small fish	LC Unknown
King arboreal rice rat	O. rex Thomas, 1910	Northern South America	Size: 12–14 cm (5–6 in) long, plus 14–17 cm (6–7 in) tail Habitat: Forest Diet: Grass, sedges, seeds, fruit, insects, crustaceans, and small fish	LC Unknown
Mamore arboreal rice rat	O. mamorae Thomas, 1906	Central South America	Size: 12–17 cm (5–7 in) long, plus 14–18 cm (6–7 in) tail Habitat: Forest, savanna, and shrubland Diet: Grass, sedges, seeds, fruit, insects, crustaceans, and small fish	LC Unknown
North Amazonian arboreal rice rat	O. auyantepui Tate, 1939	Northern South America	Size: 10–13 cm (4–5 in) long, plus 10–13 cm (4–5 in) tail Habitat: Forest Diet: Grass, sedges, seeds, fruit, insects, crustaceans, and small fish	LC Unknown
Red arboreal rice rat	O. rutilus Anthony, 1921	Northern South America	Size: 7–12 cm (3–5 in) long, plus 8–13 cm (3–5 in) tail Habitat: Forest Diet: Grass, sedges, seeds, fruit, insects, crustaceans, and small fish	LC Unknown
Robert's arboreal rice rat	O. roberti Thomas, 1904	Central South America	Size: 8–13 cm (3–5 in) long, plus 10–16 cm (4–6 in) tail Habitat: Forest Diet: Grass, sedges, seeds, fruit, insects, crustaceans, and small fish	LC Unknown
Trinidad arboreal rice rat	O. trinitatis (Allen & Chapman, 1893)	Central America and western, northern, and eastern South America	Size: 11–14 cm (4–6 in) long, plus 13–17 cm (5–7 in) tail Habitat: Forest Diet: Grass, sedges, seeds, fruit, insects, crustaceans, and small fish	LC Unknown
Unicolored arboreal rice rat	O. concolor Wagner, 1845	Central and northern South America	Size: 11–15 cm (4–6 in) long, plus 13–16 cm (5–6 in) tail Habitat: Forest Diet: Grass, sedges, seeds, fruit, insects, crustaceans, and small fish	LC Unknown
Venezuelan arboreal rice rat	O. speciosus (Allen & Chapman, 1893)	Northern South America	Size: 10–13 cm (4–5 in) long, plus 12–15 cm (5–6 in) tail Habitat: Forest Diet: Grass, sedges, seeds, fruit, insects, crustaceans, and small fish	LC Unknown
Yellow arboreal rice rat	O. flavicans (Thomas, 1894)	Northern Colombia and northwestern Venezuela	Size: 10–14 cm (4–6 in) long, plus 13–15 cm (5–6 in) tail Habitat: Forest Diet: Grass, sedges, seeds, fruit, insects, crustaceans, and small fish	LC Unknown

Genus Oligoryzomys – Bangs, 1900 – nineteen species
Common name	Scientific name and subspecies	Range	Size and ecology	IUCN status and estimated population
Andean pygmy rice rat	O. andinus (Osgood, 1914)	Peru and Bolivia	Size: About 10 cm (4 in) long, plus about 15 cm (6 in) tail Habitat: Shrubland Diet: Seeds, fruit, and insects	LC Unknown
Black-footed pygmy rice rat	O. nigripes (Olfers, 1818)	Eastern South America	Size: 7–12 cm (3–5 in) long, plus 10–15 cm (4–6 in) tail Habitat: Shrubland, savanna, forest, and grassland Diet: Seeds, fruit, and insects	LC Unknown
Brazilian pygmy rice rat	O. eliurus Wagner, 1845	Eastern South America	Size: 7–12 cm (3–5 in) long, plus 10–15 cm (4–6 in) tail Habitat: Grassland, shrubland, inland wetlands, and forest Diet: Seeds, fruit, and insects	LC Unknown
Brenda's pygmy rice rat	O. brendae Massoia, 1998	Northern Argentina	Size: 7–11 cm (3–4 in) long, plus 11–14 cm (4–6 in) tail Habitat: Forest and grassland Diet: Seeds, fruit, and insects	DD Unknown
Chacoan pygmy rice rat	O. chacoensis (Myers & Carleton, 1981)	Central South America	Size: About 10 cm (4 in) long, plus 10–15 cm (4–6 in) tail Habitat: Shrubland, inland wetlands, and grassland Diet: Seeds, fruit, and insects	LC Unknown
Delta pygmy rice rat	O. delticola Thomas, 1917	Southeastern South America	Size: 7–12 cm (3–5 in) long, plus 10–15 cm (4–6 in) tail Habitat: Shrubland and grassland Diet: Seeds, fruit, and insects	LC Unknown
Destructive pygmy rice rat	O. destructor (Tschudi, 1844)	Western South America	Size: 9–10 cm (4 in) long, plus 11–13 cm (4–5 in) tail Habitat: Forest and grassland Diet: Seeds, fruit, and insects	LC Unknown
Fornes' pygmy rice rat	O. fornesi (Massoia, 1973)	Central and eastern South America	Size: 8–10 cm (3–4 in) long, plus 9–13 cm (4–5 in) tail Habitat: Savanna, grassland, and shrubland Diet: Seeds, fruit, and insects	LC Unknown
Fulvous pygmy rice rat	O. fulvescens (Saussure, 1860)	Mexico, Central America, and northern South America	Size: 7–9 cm (3–4 in) long, plus 8–12 cm (3–5 in) tail Habitat: Forest Diet: Seeds, fruit, and insects	LC Unknown
Grayish pygmy rice rat	O. griseolus (Osgood, 1912)	Colombia and western Venezuela	Size: 7–9 cm (3–4 in) long, plus 9–12 cm (4–5 in) tail Habitat: Forest and grassland Diet: Seeds, fruit, and insects	LC Unknown
Highlands pygmy rice rat	O. rupestris Weksler & Bonvicino, 2005	Eastern Brazil	Size: 7–10 cm (3–4 in) long, plus 11–14 cm (4–6 in) tail Habitat: Savanna, shrubland, and grassland Diet: Seeds, fruit, and insects	DD Unknown
Long-tailed pygmy rice rat	O. longicaudatus (Bennett, 1832)	Chile and southern Argentina	Size: 9–11 cm (4 in) long, plus 10–13 cm (4–5 in) tail Habitat: Shrubland, grassland, and forest Diet: Seeds, fruit, and insects	LC Unknown
Magellanic pygmy rice rat	O. magellanicus (Bennett, 1836)	Southern Chile and southern Argentina	Size: 9–11 cm (4 in) long, plus 10–13 cm (4–5 in) tail Habitat: Forest Diet: Seeds, fruit, and insects	LC Unknown
Moojen's pygmy rice rat	O. moojeni Weksler & Bonvicino, 2005	Central Brazil	Size: 8–10 cm (3–4 in) long, plus 11–14 cm (4–6 in) tail Habitat: Savanna and forest Diet: Seeds, fruit, and insects	DD Unknown
Sandy pygmy rice rat	O. arenalis (Thomas, 1913)	Western Peru	Size: About 8 cm (3 in) long, plus about 11 cm (4 in) tail Habitat: Shrubland and desert Diet: Seeds, fruit, and insects	LC Unknown
Small-eared pygmy rice rat	O. microtis Allen, 1916	West-central South America	Size: 7–10 cm (3–4 in) long, plus 7–13 cm (3–5 in) tail Habitat: Forest Diet: Seeds, fruit, and insects	LC Unknown
Sprightly pygmy rice rat	O. vegetus (Bangs, 1902)	Costa Rica and western Panama	Size: 7–11 cm (3–4 in) long, plus 11–14 cm (4–6 in) tail Habitat: Forest Diet: Seeds, fruit, and insects	LC Unknown
St. Vincent pygmy rice rat †	O. victus (Thomas, 1898)	Saint Vincent and the Grenadines	Size: Unknown Habitat: Unknown and forest Diet: Seeds, fruit, and insects	EX 0
Straw-colored pygmy rice rat	O. stramineus Bonvicino & Weksler, 1998	Eastern Brazil	Size: 7–12 cm (3–5 in) long, plus 9–14 cm (4–6 in) tail Habitat: Shrubland, forest, savanna, and grassland Diet: Seeds, fruit, and insects	LC Unknown
Yellow pygmy rice rat	O. flavescens (Waterhouse, 1837)	Southern South America	Size: 8–10 cm (3–4 in) long, plus 9–13 cm (4–5 in) tail Habitat: Shrubland, grassland, and inland wetlands Diet: Seeds, fruit, and insects	LC Unknown

Genus Oreoryzomys – Weksler, Percequillo, & Voss, 2006 – one species
Common name	Scientific name and subspecies	Range	Size and ecology	IUCN status and estimated population
Peruvian rice rat	O. balneator (Thomas, 1900)	Ecuador and northwestern Peru	Size: 7–10 cm (3–4 in) long, plus 9–12 cm (4–5 in) tail Habitat: Forest Diet: Vegetation, seeds, and insects	DD Unknown

Genus Oryzomys – Baird, 1857 – six species
Common name	Scientific name and subspecies	Range	Size and ecology	IUCN status and estimated population
Coues's rice rat	O. couesi (Alston, 1877)	Southern North America, Central America, and northwestern South America (in red)	Size: 9–15 cm (4–6 in) long, plus 10–16 cm (4–6 in) tail Habitat: Inland wetlands Diet: Grass, sedges, seeds, fruit, insects, crustaceans, and small fish	LC Unknown
Gorgas's rice rat	O. gorgasi Hershkovitz, 1971	Northwestern South America	Size: 9–16 cm (4–6 in) long, plus 11–14 cm (4–6 in) tail Habitat: Inland wetlands, forest, and grassland Diet: Grass, sedges, seeds, fruit, insects, crustaceans, and small fish	EN Unknown
Jamaican rice rat †	O. antillarum Thomas, 1898	Jamaica (in green)	Size: Unknown Habitat: Unknown Diet: Grass, sedges, seeds, fruit, insects, crustaceans, and small fish	EX 0
Marsh rice rat	O. palustris (Harlan, 1837)	Southern and eastern United States and northeastern Mexico (in dark blue, former range in light blue)	Size: 13–14 cm (5–6 in) long, plus 12–15 cm (5–6 in) tail Habitat: Inland wetlands, grassland, and intertidal marine Diet: Grass, sedges, seeds, fruit, insects, crustaceans, and small fish	LC Unknown
Nelson's rice rat †	O. nelsoni Merriam, 1898	Islas Marías west of Mexico (in orange)	Size: Unknown Habitat: Shrubland and inland wetlands Diet: Grass, sedges, seeds, fruit, insects, crustaceans, and small fish	EX 0
Thomas's rice rat	O. dimidiatus (Thomas, 1905)	Southeastern Nicaragua (in yellow)	Size: 11–13 cm (4–5 in) long, plus 11–12 cm (4–5 in) tail Habitat: Forest and inland wetlands Diet: Grass, sedges, seeds, fruit, insects, crustaceans, and small fish	DD Unknown

Genus Oxymycterus – Waterhouse, 1837 – seventeen species
Common name	Scientific name and subspecies	Range	Size and ecology	IUCN status and estimated population
Amazonian hocicudo	O. amazonicus Hershkovitz, 1994	Central Brazil	Size: 14–15 cm (6 in) long, plus 8–10 cm (3–4 in) tail Habitat: Forest Diet: Insects, as well as other invertebrates and vegetation	LC Unknown
Angular hocicudo	O. angularis Thomas, 1909	Eastern Brazil	Size: 12–20 cm (5–8 in) long, plus 9–16 cm (4–6 in) tail Habitat: Shrubland, grassland, and savanna Diet: Insects, as well as other invertebrates and vegetation	LC Unknown
Argentine hocicudo	O. akodontius Thomas, 1921	Northern Argentina	Size: 10–16 cm (4–6 in) long, plus 7–13 cm (3–5 in) tail Habitat: Forest Diet: Insects, as well as other invertebrates and vegetation	NE Unknown
Atlantic Forest hocicudo	O. dasytrichus (Schinz, 1821)	Southeastern Brazil	Size: 12–20 cm (5–8 in) long, plus 9–16 cm (4–6 in) tail Habitat: Forest, inland wetlands, and shrubland Diet: Insects, as well as other invertebrates and vegetation	LC Unknown
Caparaó hocicudo	O. caparoae Hershkovitz, 1998	Southeastern Brazil	Size: 11–14 cm (4–6 in) long, plus 8–11 cm (3–4 in) tail Habitat: Forest Diet: Insects, as well as other invertebrates and vegetation	LC Unknown
Cook's hocicudo	O. josei Hoffmann, Lessa, & Smith, 2002	Southern Uruguay	Size: 12–18 cm (5–7 in) long, plus 7–11 cm (3–4 in) tail Habitat: Inland wetlands, shrubland, and grassland Diet: Insects, as well as other invertebrates and vegetation	NT Unknown
Hispid hocicudo	O. hispidus Pictet, 1843	Southeastern Brazil	Size: 12–20 cm (5–8 in) long, plus 9–16 cm (4–6 in) tail Habitat: Forest Diet: Insects, as well as other invertebrates and vegetation	LC Unknown
Incan hocicudo	O. inca Thomas, 1900	Bolivia and Peru	Size: 13–19 cm (5–7 in) long, plus 8–13 cm (3–5 in) tail Habitat: Forest, grassland, shrubland, and savanna Diet: Insects, as well as other invertebrates and vegetation	LC Unknown
Long-nosed hocicudo	O. nasutus (Waterhouse, 1837)	Southern Brazil and Uruguay	Size: 12–14 cm (5–6 in) long, plus 8–10 cm (3–4 in) tail Habitat: Inland wetlands and grassland Diet: Insects, as well as other invertebrates and vegetation	LC Unknown
Paramo hocicudo	O. paramensis Thomas, 1902	Western South America	Size: 10–16 cm (4–6 in) long, plus 7–13 cm (3–5 in) tail Habitat: Forest Diet: Insects, as well as other invertebrates and vegetation	LC Unknown
Quaestor hocicudo	O. quaestor Thomas, 1903	Southern Brazil and northeastern Argentina	Size: 13–18 cm (5–7 in) long, plus 9–15 cm (4–6 in) tail Habitat: Shrubland and forest Diet: Insects, as well as other invertebrates and vegetation	LC Unknown
Quechuan hocicudo	O. hucucha Hinojosa, Anderson, & Patton, 1987	Central Bolivia	Size: 9–11 cm (4 in) long, plus 7–8 cm (3 in) tail Habitat: Forest Diet: Insects, as well as other invertebrates and vegetation	EN Unknown
Ravine hocicudo	O. wayku Jayat, D'Elía, Pardiñas, Miotti, & Ortiz, 2008	Northern Argentina	Size: 12–15 cm (5–6 in) long, plus 7–10 cm (3–4 in) tail Habitat: Forest and grassland Diet: Insects, as well as other invertebrates and vegetation	VU Unknown
Red hocicudo	O. rufus Fischer von Waldheim, 1814	Northern Argentina	Size: 12–17 cm (5–7 in) long, plus 6–12 cm (2–5 in) tail Habitat: Grassland Diet: Insects, as well as other invertebrates and vegetation	LC Unknown
Robert's hocicudo	O. roberti Thomas, 1901	Southeastern Brazil	Size: 8–13 cm (3–5 in) long, plus 10–16 cm (4–6 in) tail Habitat: Grassland and forest Diet: Insects, as well as other invertebrates and vegetation	LC Unknown
Small hocicudo	O. hiska Hinojosa, Anderson, & Patton, 1987	Southeastern Brazil	Size: 9–13 cm (4–5 in) long, plus 7–10 cm (3–4 in) tail Habitat: Forest Diet: Insects, as well as other invertebrates and vegetation	LC Unknown
Spy hocicudo	O. delator Thomas, 1903	Southern Brazil and Paraguay	Size: 11–18 cm (4–7 in) long, plus 7–12 cm (3–5 in) tail Habitat: Inland wetlands and grassland Diet: Insects, as well as other invertebrates and vegetation	LC Unknown

Genus Phaenomys – Thomas, 1917 – one species
Common name	Scientific name and subspecies	Range	Size and ecology	IUCN status and estimated population
Rio de Janeiro arboreal rat	P. ferrugineus (Thomas, 1894)	Southeastern Brazil	Size: 14–17 cm (6–7 in) long, plus 18–20 cm (7–8 in) tail Habitat: Forest Diet: Vegetation, seeds, and insects	EN Unknown

Genus Phyllotis – Waterhouse, 1837 – sixteen species
Common name	Scientific name and subspecies	Range	Size and ecology	IUCN status and estimated population
Andean leaf-eared mouse	P. andium Thomas, 1912	Ecuador and Peru	Size: About 11 cm (4 in) long, plus 10–14 cm (4–6 in) tail Habitat: Shrubland, inland wetlands, and forest Diet: Seeds, vegetation, and lichen	LC Unknown
Anita's leaf-eared mouse	P. anitae Jayat, D'Elía, Pardiñas, & Namen, 2007	Northern Argentina	Size: 8–13 cm (3–5 in) long, plus 9–13 cm (4–5 in) tail Habitat: Forest Diet: Seeds, vegetation, and lichen	DD Unknown
Buenos Aires leaf-eared mouse	P. bonariensis Crespo, 1964	Eastern Argentina	Size: 12–16 cm (5–6 in) long, plus 11–15 cm (4–6 in) tail Habitat: Grassland, rocky areas, and shrubland Diet: Seeds, vegetation, and lichen	NT Unknown
Bunchgrass leaf-eared mouse	P. osilae Allen, 1901	Western South America	Size: About 11 cm (4 in) long, plus about 12 cm (5 in) tail Habitat: Grassland and rocky areas Diet: Seeds, vegetation, and lichen	LC Unknown
Capricorn leaf-eared mouse	P. caprinus Pearson, 1958	Southern Bolivia and northern Argentina	Size: 10–14 cm (4–6 in) long, plus 11–16 cm (4–6 in) tail Habitat: Grassland, forest, and shrubland Diet: Seeds, vegetation, and lichen	LC Unknown
Darwin's leaf-eared mouse	P. darwini (Waterhouse, 1837)	Central Chile	Size: 10–14 cm (4–6 in) long, plus 10–15 cm (4–6 in) tail Habitat: Shrubland Diet: Seeds, vegetation, and lichen	LC Unknown
Definitive leaf-eared mouse	P. definitus Osgood, 1915	Western Peru	Size: About 12 cm (5 in) long, plus 10–14 cm (4–6 in) tail Habitat: Rocky areas and shrubland Diet: Seeds, vegetation, and lichen	EN Unknown
Friendly leaf-eared mouse	P. amicus (Thomas, 1900)	Western Peru	Size: 8–9 cm (3–4 in) long, plus 10–11 cm (4 in) tail Habitat: Desert and rocky areas Diet: Seeds, vegetation, and lichen	LC Unknown
Gerbil leaf-eared mouse	P. gerbillus (Thomas, 1900)	Western Peru	Size: 7–10 cm (3–4 in) long, plus 6–9 cm (2–4 in) tail Habitat: Desert and shrubland Diet: Seeds, vegetation, and lichen	LC Unknown
Haggard's leaf-eared mouse	P. haggardi Thomas, 1908	Ecuador	Size: 9–12 cm (4–5 in) long, plus 7–9 cm (3–4 in) tail Habitat: Grassland, shrubland, and rocky areas Diet: Seeds, vegetation, and lichen	LC Unknown
Lima leaf-eared mouse	P. limatus Thomas, 1912	Southern Peru and northern Chile	Size: About 11 cm (4 in) long, plus about 13 cm (5 in) tail Habitat: Desert, shrubland, grassland, rocky areas, and forest Diet: Seeds, vegetation, and lichen	LC Unknown
Los Alisos leaf-eared mouse	P. alisosiensis Ferro, Martínez, & Barquez, 2010	Northern Argentina	Size: 12–15 cm (5–6 in) long, plus 12–14 cm (5–6 in) tail Habitat: Forest Diet: Seeds, vegetation, and lichen	EN Unknown
Master leaf-eared mouse	P. magister Thomas, 1912	Southern Peru and northern Chile	Size: 10–15 cm (4–6 in) long, plus about 16 cm (6 in) tail Habitat: Shrubland, rocky areas, and forest Diet: Seeds, vegetation, and lichen	LC Unknown
Osgood's leaf-eared mouse	P. osgoodi Fischer, 1945	Western South America	Size: 8–14 cm (3–6 in) long, plus 8–11 cm (3–4 in) tail Habitat: Grassland, shrubland, and rocky areas Diet: Seeds, vegetation, and lichen	DD Unknown
Wolffsohn's leaf-eared mouse	P. wolffsohni Thomas, 1902	Bolivia	Size: 11–15 cm (4–6 in) long, plus 11–16 cm (4–6 in) tail Habitat: Shrubland Diet: Seeds, vegetation, and lichen	LC Unknown
Yellow-rumped leaf-eared mouse	P. xanthopygus (Waterhouse, 1837)	Western and southern South America	Size: 9–15 cm (4–6 in) long, plus 8–15 cm (3–6 in) tail Habitat: Rocky areas, forest, shrubland, and grassland Diet: Seeds, vegetation, and lichen	LC Unknown

Genus Podoxymys – Anthony, 1929 – one species
Common name	Scientific name and subspecies	Range	Size and ecology	IUCN status and estimated population
Roraima mouse	P. roraimae Anthony, 1929	Northern South America	Size: 7–11 cm (3–4 in) long, plus 7–11 cm (3–4 in) tail Habitat: Forest Diet: Vegetation, seeds, and insects	VU Unknown

Genus Pseudoryzomys – Hershkovitz, 1962 – one species
Common name	Scientific name and subspecies	Range	Size and ecology	IUCN status and estimated population
Brazilian false rice rat	P. simplex (Winge, 1888)	Central and eastern South America	Size: 9–13 cm (4–5 in) long, plus 10–14 cm (4–6 in) tail Habitat: Grassland, savanna, and shrubland Diet: Grass, sedges, seeds, fruit, insects, crustaceans, and small fish	LC Unknown

Genus Punomys – Osgood, 1943 – two species
Common name	Scientific name and subspecies	Range	Size and ecology	IUCN status and estimated population
Eastern puna mouse	P. kofordi Pacheco & Patton, 1995	Southern Peru	Size: 12–17 cm (5–7 in) long, plus 6–9 cm (2–4 in) tail Habitat: Shrubland and grassland Diet: Twigs from herbs	NT Unknown
Puna mouse	P. lemminus Osgood, 1943	Western South America	Size: 13–15 cm (5–6 in) long, plus 4–7 cm (2–3 in) tail Habitat: Grassland, shrubland, and rocky areas Diet: Twigs from herbs	VU Unknown

Genus Reithrodon – Waterhouse, 1837 – two species
Common name	Scientific name and subspecies	Range	Size and ecology	IUCN status and estimated population
Bunny rat	R. auritus (Fischer von Waldheim, 1814)	Argentina and southern Chile	Size: 12–15 cm (5–6 in) long, plus 7–10 cm (3–4 in) tail Habitat: Grassland and shrubland Diet: Grass, rhizomes, and roots	LC Unknown
Naked-soled conyrat	R. typicus Waterhouse, 1837	Southeastern South America	Size: 14–15 cm (6 in) long, plus 9–12 cm (4–5 in) tail Habitat: Grassland Diet: Grass, rhizomes, and roots	LC Unknown

Genus Rhagomys – Thomas, 1917 – two species
Common name	Scientific name and subspecies	Range	Size and ecology	IUCN status and estimated population
Brazilian arboreal mouse	R. rufescens (Thomas, 1886)	Southeastern Brazil	Size: 8–10 cm (3–4 in) long, plus 8–11 cm (3–4 in) tail Habitat: Forest Diet: Vegetation, seeds, and insects	VU Unknown
Long-tongued arboreal mouse	R. longilingua Luna & Patterson, 2003	Southern Peru and western Bolivia	Size: 8–11 cm (3–4 in) long, plus 9–11 cm (4 in) tail Habitat: Forest Diet: Vegetation, seeds, and insects	LC Unknown

Genus Rheomys – Thomas, 1906 – four species
Common name	Scientific name and subspecies	Range	Size and ecology	IUCN status and estimated population
Goldman's water mouse	R. raptor Goldman, 1912	Costa Rica and Panama	Size: 9–14 cm (4–6 in) long, plus 8–12 cm (3–5 in) tail Habitat: Inland wetlands and forest Diet: Fish, snails, and aquatic insects	LC Unknown
Mexican water mouse	R. mexicanus Goodwin, 1959	Southern Mexico	Size: 10–15 cm (4–6 in) long, plus 13–18 cm (5–7 in) tail Habitat: Forest and inland wetlands Diet: Fish, snails, and aquatic insects	EN Unknown
Thomas's water mouse	R. thomasi Dickey, 1928	Southern Mexico and northern Central America	Size: 10–14 cm (4–6 in) long, plus 10–14 cm (4–6 in) tail Habitat: Inland wetlands and forest Diet: Fish, snails, and aquatic insects	VU Unknown
Underwood's water mouse	R. underwoodi Thomas, 1906	Costa Rica and western Panama	Size: 13–15 cm (5–6 in) long, plus 14–16 cm (6 in) tail Habitat: Forest and inland wetlands Diet: Fish, snails, and aquatic insects	LC Unknown

Genus Rhipidomys – Tschudi, 1845 – 22 species
Common name	Scientific name and subspecies	Range	Size and ecology	IUCN status and estimated population
Albuja's climbing rat	R. albujai Brito & Ojala-Barbour, 2017	Central Ecuador	Size: 11–13 cm (4–5 in) long, plus 14–17 cm (6–7 in) tail Habitat: Forest Diet: Vegetation, seeds, and insects	DD Unknown
Atlantic Forest climbing mouse	R. mastacalis (Lund, 1841)	Eastern Brazil	Size: 12–16 cm (5–6 in) long, plus 14–17 cm (6–7 in) tail Habitat: Forest Diet: Vegetation, seeds, and insects	LC Unknown
Broad-footed climbing mouse	R. latimanus (Tomes, 1860)	Panama and northwestern South America	Size: 9–13 cm (4–5 in) long, plus 13–19 cm (5–7 in) tail Habitat: Forest Diet: Vegetation, seeds, and insects	LC Unknown
Buff-bellied climbing mouse	R. fulviventer Thomas, 1896	Venezuela and Colombia	Size: 8–12 cm (3–5 in) long, plus 10–14 cm (4–6 in) tail Habitat: Forest Diet: Vegetation, seeds, and insects	LC Unknown
Cariri climbing mouse	R. cariri Tribe, 2005	Eastern Brazil	Size: 13–19 cm (5–7 in) long, plus 14–27 cm (6–11 in) tail Habitat: Grassland Diet: Vegetation, seeds, and insects	DD Unknown
Cauca climbing mouse	R. caucensis Allen, 1913	Western Colombia	Size: About 10 cm (4 in) long, plus about 13 cm (5 in) tail Habitat: Forest Diet: Vegetation, seeds, and insects	DD Unknown
Cerrado climbing mouse	R. macrurus (Gervais, 1855)	Northern South America	Size: 11–16 cm (4–6 in) long, plus 13–19 cm (5–7 in) tail Habitat: Savanna and forest Diet: Vegetation, seeds, and insects	LC Unknown
Charming climbing mouse	R. venustus Thomas, 1900	Northern Venezuela and northern Colombia	Size: 12–15 cm (5–6 in) long, plus 12–17 cm (5–7 in) tail Habitat: Forest Diet: Vegetation, seeds, and insects	LC Unknown
Coues's climbing mouse	R. couesi (Allen & Chapman, 1893)	Venezuela and Colombia	Size: 15–21 cm (6–8 in) long, plus 17–20 cm (7–8 in) tail Habitat: Forest Diet: Vegetation, seeds, and insects	LC Unknown
Eastern Amazon climbing mouse	R. emiliae (Allen, 1916)	Brazil	Size: 11–16 cm (4–6 in) long, plus 14–18 cm (6–7 in) tail Habitat: Forest and savanna Diet: Vegetation, seeds, and insects	LC Unknown
Gardner's climbing mouse	R. gardneri Patton, Silva, & Malcolm, 2000	Southern Peru and western Brazil	Size: 16–19 cm (6–7 in) long, plus 17–20 cm (7–8 in) tail Habitat: Forest Diet: Vegetation, seeds, and insects	LC Unknown
Ipuca climbing rat	R. ipukensis Rocha, Costa, & Costa, 2011	Central Brazil	Size: 9–15 cm (4–6 in) long, plus 11–17 cm (4–7 in) tail Habitat: Forest Diet: Vegetation, seeds, and insects	DD Unknown
MacConnell's climbing mouse	R. macconnelli De Winton, 1900	Northern South America	Size: 10–13 cm (4–5 in) long, plus 14–19 cm (6–7 in) tail Habitat: Forest Diet: Vegetation, seeds, and insects	LC Unknown
Peruvian climbing mouse	R. modicus Thomas, 1926	Peru	Size: 13–17 cm (5–7 in) long, plus about 18 cm (7 in) tail Habitat: Forest Diet: Vegetation, seeds, and insects	LC Unknown
Sky climbing rat	R. itoan Costa, Geise, Pereira, & Costa, 2011	Southern Brazil	Size: 11–17 cm (4–7 in) long, plus 13–21 cm (5–8 in) tail Habitat: Forest Diet: Vegetation, seeds, and insects	LC Unknown
Southern climbing mouse	R. austrinus Thomas, 1921	Bolivia and northern Argentina	Size: 12–14 cm (5–6 in) long, plus 13–17 cm (5–7 in) tail Habitat: Forest Diet: Vegetation, seeds, and insects	LC Unknown
Splendid climbing mouse	R. nitela Thomas, 1901	Northern South America	Size: 10–14 cm (4–6 in) long, plus 15–18 cm (6–7 in) tail Habitat: Forest Diet: Vegetation, seeds, and insects	LC Unknown
Tribe's climbing rat	R. tribei Costa, Geise, Pereira, & Costa, 2011	Southeastern Brazil	Size: 9–13 cm (4–5 in) long, plus 13–15 cm (5–6 in) tail Habitat: Forest Diet: Vegetation, seeds, and insects	DD Unknown
Venezuelan climbing mouse	R. venezuelae Thomas, 1896	Northern Venezuela and northern Colombia	Size: 12–16 cm (5–6 in) long, plus 13–19 cm (5–7 in) tail Habitat: Forest Diet: Vegetation, seeds, and insects	LC Unknown
Wetzel's climbing mouse	R. wetzeli Gardner, 1990	Southern Venezuela and northern Brazil	Size: 6–11 cm (2–4 in) long, plus 8–13 cm (3–5 in) tail Habitat: Forest and rocky areas Diet: Vegetation, seeds, and insects	LC Unknown
White-footed climbing mouse	R. leucodactylus Tschudi, 1844	Northern and western South America	Size: 17–21 cm (7–8 in) long, plus 22–24 cm (9 in) tail Habitat: Forest Diet: Vegetation, seeds, and insects	LC Unknown
Yellow-bellied climbing mouse	R. ochrogaster Allen, 1901	Southern Peru and western Bolivia	Size: 15–16 cm (6 in) long, plus 19–23 cm (7–9 in) tail Habitat: Forest Diet: Vegetation, seeds, and insects	DD Unknown

Genus Salinomys – Braun & Mares, 1995 – one species
Common name	Scientific name and subspecies	Range	Size and ecology	IUCN status and estimated population
Delicate salt flat mouse	S. delicatus Braun & Mares, 1995	Northern Argentina	Size: 6–9 cm (2–4 in) long, plus 9–13 cm (4–5 in) tail Habitat: Shrubland and inland wetlands Diet: Seeds, arthropods, and vegetation	DD Unknown

Genus Scapteromys – Waterhouse, 1837 – two species
Common name	Scientific name and subspecies	Range	Size and ecology	IUCN status and estimated population
Argentine swamp rat	S. aquaticus Thomas, 1920	Northern Argentina and southern Paraguay	Size: 12–25 cm (5–10 in) long, plus 10–15 cm (4–6 in) tail Habitat: Shrubland and inland wetlands Diet: Grass and seeds	LC Unknown
Waterhouse's swamp rat	S. tumidus (Waterhouse, 1837)	Southeastern South America	Size: 15–20 cm (6–8 in) long, plus 13–18 cm (5–7 in) tail Habitat: Inland wetlands, grassland, shrubland, and forest Diet: Grass and seeds	LC Unknown

Genus Scolomys – Anthony, 1924 – two species
Common name	Scientific name and subspecies	Range	Size and ecology	IUCN status and estimated population
South American spiny mouse	S. melanops Anthony, 1924	Ecuador and northern Peru	Size: 8–11 cm (3–4 in) long, plus 5–8 cm (2–3 in) tail Habitat: Forest Diet: Seeds and invertebrates	LC Unknown
Ucayali spiny mouse	S. ucayalensis Pacheco, 1991	Western South America	Size: 8–12 cm (3–5 in) long, plus 6–8 cm (2–3 in) tail Habitat: Forest Diet: Seeds and invertebrates	LC Unknown

Genus Sigmodon – Say & Ord, 1825 – fourteen species
Common name	Scientific name and subspecies	Range	Size and ecology	IUCN status and estimated population
Allen's cotton rat	S. alleni Bailey, 1902	Southern Mexico	Size: 13–16 cm (5–6 in) long, plus 8–13 cm (3–5 in) tail Habitat: Forest Diet: Omnivorous, including vegetation, insects, invertebrates, and small animals	LC Unknown
Alston's cotton rat	S. alstoni Thomas, 1881	Northern South America	Size: 10–16 cm (4–6 in) long, plus 7–11 cm (3–4 in) tail Habitat: Grassland and shrubland Diet: Omnivorous, including vegetation, insects, invertebrates, and small animals	LC Unknown
Arizona cotton rat	S. arizonae Mearns, 1890	Western Mexico and southwestern United States	Size: 22–24 cm (9 in) long, plus 9–16 cm (4–6 in) tail Habitat: Shrubland, desert, and grassland Diet: Omnivorous, including vegetation, insects, invertebrates, and small animals	LC Unknown
Hispid cotton rat	S. hispidus Say & Ord, 1825	Central and southern United States and northern Mexico	Size: 12–23 cm (5–9 in) long, plus 8–17 cm (3–7 in) tail Habitat: Desert and grassland Diet: Omnivorous, including vegetation, insects, invertebrates, and small animals	LC Unknown
Jaliscan cotton rat	S. mascotensis Allen, 1897	Southern Mexico	Size: 12–20 cm (5–8 in) long, plus 7–14 cm (3–6 in) tail Habitat: Forest Diet: Omnivorous, including vegetation, insects, invertebrates, and small animals	LC Unknown
Miahuatlán cotton rat	S. planifrons Nelson & Goldman, 1933	Southern Mexico	Size: About 12 cm (5 in) long, plus 8–12 cm (3–5 in) tail Habitat: Forest Diet: Omnivorous, including vegetation, insects, invertebrates, and small animals	NE Unknown
Montane cotton rat	S. zanjonensis Goodwin, 1932	Southern Mexico and Guatamala	Size: 14–17 cm (6–7 in) long, plus 10–16 cm (4–6 in) tail Habitat: Desert and grassland Diet: Omnivorous, including vegetation, insects, invertebrates, and small animals	NE Unknown
Peruvian cotton rat	S. peruanus Allen, 1897	Western Ecuador and western Peru	Size: 12–18 cm (5–7 in) long, plus 7–12 cm (3–5 in) tail Habitat: Forest and inland wetlands Diet: Omnivorous, including vegetation, insects, invertebrates, and small animals	LC Unknown
Southern cotton rat	S. hirsutus Burmeister, 1854	Southern Mexico, Central America, and northwestern South America	Size: 12–23 cm (5–9 in) long, plus 9–17 cm (4–7 in) tail Habitat: Forest Diet: Omnivorous, including vegetation, insects, invertebrates, and small animals	LC Unknown
Tawny-bellied cotton rat	S. fulviventer Allen, 1889	Mexico and southwestern United States	Size: 13–20 cm (5–8 in) long, plus 10–12 cm (4–5 in) tail Habitat: Forest, shrubland, and grassland Diet: Omnivorous, including vegetation, insects, invertebrates, and small animals	LC Unknown
Toltec cotton rat	S. toltecus Saussure, 1860	Eastern Mexico and northern Central America	Size: 13–23 cm (5–9 in) long, plus 11–17 cm (4–7 in) tail Habitat: Grassland Diet: Omnivorous, including vegetation, insects, invertebrates, and small animals	LC Unknown
Unexpected cotton rat	S. inopinatus Anthony, 1924	Ecuador	Size: 13–17 cm (5–7 in) long, plus 7–10 cm (3–4 in) tail Habitat: Inland wetlands, shrubland, and grassland Diet: Omnivorous, including vegetation, insects, invertebrates, and small animals	VU Unknown
White-eared cotton rat	S. leucotis Bailey, 1902	Mexico	Size: 13–16 cm (5–6 in) long, plus 8–11 cm (3–4 in) tail Habitat: Forest Diet: Omnivorous, including vegetation, insects, invertebrates, and small animals	LC Unknown
Yellow-nosed cotton rat	S. ochrognathus Bailey, 1902	Mexico and southwestern United States	Size: 13–15 cm (5–6 in) long, plus 8–11 cm (3–4 in) tail Habitat: Forest and grassland Diet: Omnivorous, including vegetation, insects, invertebrates, and small animals	LC Unknown

Genus Sigmodontomys – Allen, 1897 – one species
Common name	Scientific name and subspecies	Range	Size and ecology	IUCN status and estimated population
Alfaro's rice water rat	S. alfari Allen, 1897	Central America and northwestern South America	Size: 12–18 cm (5–7 in) long, plus 14–19 cm (6–7 in) tail Habitat: Inland wetlands and forest Diet: Seeds and vegetation	LC Unknown

Genus Sooretamys – Weksler, Percequillo, & Voss, 2006 – one species
Common name	Scientific name and subspecies	Range	Size and ecology	IUCN status and estimated population
Rat-headed rice rat	S. angouya (Fischer von Waldheim, 1814)	Southeastern South America	Size: 12–21 cm (5–8 in) long, plus 16–24 cm (6–9 in) tail Habitat: Forest and savanna Diet: Vegetation, seeds, and insects	LC Unknown

Genus Tanyuromys – Pine, Timm, & Weksler, 2012 – one species
Common name	Scientific name and subspecies	Range	Size and ecology	IUCN status and estimated population
Harris's rice water rat	T. aphrastus Harris Jr., 1932	Southern Central America and northwestern South America	Size: 11–16 cm (4–6 in) long, plus 17–23 cm (7–9 in) tail Habitat: Forest Diet: Vegetation, seeds, and insects	DD Unknown

Genus Tapecomys – Anderson & Yates, 2000 – one species
Common name	Scientific name and subspecies	Range	Size and ecology	IUCN status and estimated population
Primordial tapecua	T. primus Anderson & Yates, 2000	Southern Bolivia and northern Argentina	Size: 12–16 cm (5–6 in) long, plus 14–16 cm (6 in) tail Habitat: Forest Diet: Vegetation, seeds, and insects	LC Unknown

Genus Thalpomys – Thomas, 1916 – two species
Common name	Scientific name and subspecies	Range	Size and ecology	IUCN status and estimated population
Cerrado mouse	T. cerradensis Hershkovitz, 1990	Central Brazil	Size: 9–11 cm (4 in) long, plus 5–7 cm (2–3 in) tail Habitat: Savanna, grassland, and shrubland Diet: Vegetation, seeds, and insects	LC Unknown
Hairy-eared cerrado mouse	T. lasiotis Thomas, 1916	Brazil	Size: About 8 cm (3 in) long, plus about 5 cm (2 in) tail Habitat: Shrubland, grassland, and savanna Diet: Vegetation, seeds, and insects	LC Unknown

Genus Thaptomys – Thomas, 1916 – one species
Common name	Scientific name and subspecies	Range	Size and ecology	IUCN status and estimated population
Blackish grass mouse	T. nigrita (Lichtenstein, 1830)	Southeastern South America	Size: 8–10 cm (3–4 in) long, plus 3–5 cm (1–2 in) tail Habitat: Grassland, shrubland, and forest Diet: Plants and invertebrates	LC Unknown

Genus Thomasomys – Coues, 1884 – 42 species
Common name	Scientific name and subspecies	Range	Size and ecology	IUCN status and estimated population
Anderson's Oldfield mouse	T. andersoni Salazar-Bravo & Yates, 2007	Bolivia	Size: 10–11 cm (4 in) long, plus 12–13 cm (5 in) tail Habitat: Forest Diet: Vegetation, seeds, and insects	VU Unknown
Apeco Oldfield mouse	T. apeco Leo & Gardner, 1993	Central Peru	Size: About 24 cm (9 in) long, plus 28–33 cm (11–13 in) tail Habitat: Forest Diet: Vegetation, seeds, and insects	LC Unknown
Ash-colored Oldfield mouse	T. cinereus (Thomas, 1882)	Western Peru	Size: 10–15 cm (4–6 in) long, plus about 15 cm (6 in) tail Habitat: Forest Diet: Vegetation, seeds, and insects	LC Unknown
Ashaninka Oldfield mouse	T. onkiro Luna & Pacheco, 2002	Southern Peru	Size: 9–12 cm (4–5 in) long, plus 14–16 cm (6 in) tail Habitat: Shrubland and forest Diet: Vegetation, seeds, and insects	LC Unknown
Ashy-bellied Oldfield mouse	T. cinereiventer Allen, 1912	Western Colombia	Size: 12–17 cm (5–7 in) long, plus 14–18 cm (6–7 in) tail Habitat: Forest Diet: Vegetation, seeds, and insects	LC Unknown
Austral Oldfield mouse	T. australis Anthony, 1925	Central Bolivia	Size: 8–10 cm (3–4 in) long, plus about 14 cm (6 in) tail Habitat: Unknown Diet: Vegetation, seeds, and insects	DD Unknown
Beady-eyed mouse	T. baeops (Thomas, 1899)	Western Colombia and Ecuador	Size: 9–12 cm (4–5 in) long, plus 10–15 cm (4–6 in) tail Habitat: Forest, shrubland, and grassland Diet: Vegetation, seeds, and insects	LC Unknown
Cajamarca Oldfield mouse	T. praetor (Thomas, 1900)	Western Peru	Size: 16–19 cm (6–7 in) long, plus about 18 cm (7 in) tail Habitat: Shrubland, grassland, and forest Diet: Vegetation, seeds, and insects	NT Unknown
Central Andes Oldfield mouse	T. contradictus Anthony, 1925	Western Colombia	Size: 10–14 cm (4–6 in) long, plus about 15 cm (6 in) tail Habitat: Forest Diet: Vegetation, seeds, and insects	DD Unknown
Cinnamon-colored Oldfield mouse	T. cinnameus Anthony, 1924	Ecuador and southwestern Colombia	Size: 8–9 cm (3–4 in) long, plus 11–13 cm (4–5 in) tail Habitat: Rocky areas, forest, and inland wetlands Diet: Vegetation, seeds, and insects	LC Unknown
Colombian Oldfield mouse	T. dispar Anthony, 1925	Southwestern Colombia	Size: 9–12 cm (4–5 in) long, plus tail Habitat: Forest Diet: Vegetation, seeds, and insects	DD Unknown
Daphne's Oldfield mouse	T. daphne Thomas, 1917	Bolivia and southern Peru	Size: 8–11 cm (3–4 in) long, plus about 13 cm (5 in) tail Habitat: Forest Diet: Vegetation, seeds, and insects	LC Unknown
Distinguished Oldfield mouse	T. notatus Thomas, 1917	Peru	Size: 11–13 cm (4–5 in) long, plus 10–13 cm (4–5 in) tail Habitat: Forest Diet: Vegetation, seeds, and insects	LC Unknown
Dressy Oldfield mouse	T. vestitus (Thomas, 1898)	Western Venezuela	Size: 13–15 cm (5–6 in) long, plus about 17 cm (7 in) tail Habitat: Forest Diet: Vegetation, seeds, and insects	NT Unknown
Forest Oldfield mouse	T. silvestris Anthony, 1924	Ecuador	Size: 9–13 cm (4–5 in) long, plus 13–16 cm (5–6 in) tail Habitat: Shrubland, forest, and grassland Diet: Vegetation, seeds, and insects	LC Unknown
Golden Oldfield mouse	T. aureus (Tomes, 1860)	Western South America	Size: 14–18 cm (6–7 in) long, plus 17–25 cm (7–10 in) tail Habitat: Forest Diet: Vegetation, seeds, and insects	LC Unknown
Hudson's Oldfield mouse	T. hudsoni Anthony, 1923	Southern Ecuador	Size: 8–10 cm (3–4 in) long, plus 11–12 cm (4–5 in) tail Habitat: Grassland and shrubland Diet: Vegetation, seeds, and insects	VU Unknown
Inca Oldfield mouse	T. incanus (Thomas, 1894)	Peru	Size: 11–14 cm (4–6 in) long, plus about 13 cm (5 in) tail Habitat: Forest Diet: Vegetation, seeds, and insects	LC Unknown
Kalinowski's Oldfield mouse	T. kalinowskii (Thomas, 1894)	Peru	Size: 13–15 cm (5–6 in) long, plus about 16 cm (6 in) tail Habitat: Forest Diet: Vegetation, seeds, and insects	LC Unknown
Ladew's Oldfield mouse	T. ladewi Anthony, 1926	Southern Peru and western Bolivia	Size: 12–14 cm (5–6 in) long, plus about 16 cm (6 in) tail Habitat: Forest Diet: Vegetation, seeds, and insects	LC Unknown
Large-eared Oldfield mouse	T. macrotis Gardner & Romo, 1993	Central Peru	Size: 15–17 cm (6–7 in) long, plus 19–22 cm (7–9 in) tail Habitat: Forest, shrubland, and grassland Diet: Vegetation, seeds, and insects	LC Unknown
Montane Oldfield mouse	T. oreas Anthony, 1926	Peru and Bolivia	Size: 9–11 cm (4 in) long, plus about 14 cm (6 in) tail Habitat: Forest Diet: Vegetation, seeds, and insects	LC Unknown
Paramo Oldfield mouse	T. paramorum Thomas, 1898	Ecuador and southwestern Colombia	Size: 8–12 cm (3–5 in) long, plus 11–14 cm (4–6 in) tail Habitat: Grassland, forest, and shrubland Diet: Vegetation, seeds, and insects	LC Unknown
Peruvian Oldfield mouse	T. eleusis Thomas, 1926	Central Peru	Size: 12–14 cm (5–6 in) long, plus 12–15 cm (5–6 in) tail Habitat: Grassland, shrubland, and forest Diet: Vegetation, seeds, and insects	VU Unknown
Pichincha Oldfield mouse	T. vulcani (Thomas, 1898)	Ecuador	Size: 11–13 cm (4–5 in) long, plus 11–14 cm (4–6 in) tail Habitat: Grassland, shrubland, and forest Diet: Vegetation, seeds, and insects	DD Unknown
Popayán Oldfield mouse	T. popayanus Allen, 1912	Western Colombia	Size: 14–17 cm (6–7 in) long, plus 20–22 cm (8–9 in) tail Habitat: Grassland, forest, and shrubland Diet: Vegetation, seeds, and insects	DD Unknown
Red Andean Oldfield mouse	T. auricularis (Anthony, 1923)	Southern Ecuador	Size: 13–16 cm (5–6 in) long, plus 16–19 cm (6–7 in) tail Habitat: Forest and grassland Diet: Vegetation, seeds, and insects	DD Unknown
Rosalinda's Oldfield mouse	T. rosalinda Thomas & St. Leger, 1926	Western Peru	Size: About 14 cm (6 in) long, plus about 17 cm (7 in) tail Habitat: Forest Diet: Vegetation, seeds, and insects	EN Unknown
Silky Oldfield mouse	T. bombycinus Anthony, 1925	Western Colombia	Size: 11–13 cm (4–5 in) long, plus about 13 cm (5 in) tail Habitat: Forest, shrubland, and grassland Diet: Vegetation, seeds, and insects	VU Unknown
Slender Oldfield mouse	T. gracilis Thomas, 1917	Southern Peru	Size: 8–11 cm (3–4 in) long, plus about 12 cm (5 in) tail Habitat: Inland wetlands, grassland, and forest Diet: Vegetation, seeds, and insects	NT Unknown
Smoky Oldfield mouse	T. fumeus Anthony, 1924	Ecuador	Size: 10–13 cm (4–5 in) long, plus 9–12 cm (4–5 in) tail Habitat: Unknown Diet: Vegetation, seeds, and insects	DD Unknown
Snow-footed Oldfield mouse	T. niveipes (Thomas, 1896)	Central Colombia	Size: 11–14 cm (4–6 in) long, plus 11–14 cm (4–6 in) tail Habitat: Grassland and shrubland Diet: Vegetation, seeds, and insects	LC Unknown
Soft-furred Oldfield mouse	T. laniger (Thomas, 1895)	Colombia	Size: 10–12 cm (4–5 in) long, plus 10–13 cm (4–5 in) tail Habitat: Grassland, shrubland, and forest Diet: Vegetation, seeds, and insects	LC Unknown
Strong-tailed Oldfield mouse	T. ischyrus Osgood, 1914	Peru	Size: 13–14 cm (5–6 in) long, plus about 15 cm (6 in) tail Habitat: Forest Diet: Vegetation, seeds, and insects	LC Unknown
Taczanowski's Oldfield mouse	T. taczanowskii (Thomas, 1882)	Western South America	Size: About 10 cm (4 in) long, plus about 14 cm (6 in) tail Habitat: Grassland, shrubland, and forest Diet: Vegetation, seeds, and insects	LC Unknown
Thomas's Oldfield mouse	T. pyrrhonotus Thomas, 1886	Southern Ecuador and northwestern Peru	Size: 13–15 cm (5–6 in) long, plus about 19 cm (7 in) tail Habitat: Grassland, shrubland, and forest Diet: Vegetation, seeds, and insects	VU Unknown
Ucucha Oldfield mouse	T. ucucha Voss, 2003	Northern Ecuador and Southwestern Colombia	Size: 9–11 cm (4 in) long, plus 12–16 cm (5–6 in) tail Habitat: Grassland and forest Diet: Vegetation, seeds, and insects	VU Unknown
Unicolored Oldfield mouse	T. monochromos Bangs, 1900	Northern Colombia	Size: 10–12 cm (4–5 in) long, plus about 12 cm (5 in) tail Habitat: Forest and grassland Diet: Vegetation, seeds, and insects	VU Unknown
Venezuelan Oldfield mouse	T. emeritus Thomas, 1916	Western Venezuela	Size: 10–12 cm (4–5 in) long, plus 10–13 cm (4–5 in) tail Habitat: Grassland and forest Diet: Vegetation, seeds, and insects	DD Unknown
Wandering Oldfield mouse	T. erro Anthony, 1926	Ecuador	Size: 10–16 cm (4–6 in) long, plus 13–18 cm (5–7 in) tail Habitat: Forest Diet: Vegetation, seeds, and insects	LC Unknown
White-tipped Oldfield mouse	T. caudivarius Anthony, 1923	Ecuador and western Peru	Size: 9–13 cm (4–5 in) long, plus 14–17 cm (6–7 in) tail Habitat: Forest Diet: Vegetation, seeds, and insects	LC Unknown
Woodland Oldfield mouse	T. hylophilus Osgood, 1912	Northern Colombia and western Venezuela	Size: 10–13 cm (4–5 in) long, plus 12–16 cm (5–6 in) tail Habitat: Forest Diet: Vegetation, seeds, and insects	VU Unknown

Genus Transandinomys – Weksler, Percequillo, & Voss, 2006 – two species
Common name	Scientific name and subspecies	Range	Size and ecology	IUCN status and estimated population
Long-whiskered rice rat	T. bolivaris (Allen, 1901)	Central America and northwestern South America	Size: 10–14 cm (4–6 in) long, plus 9–13 cm (4–5 in) tail Habitat: Inland wetlands and forest Diet: Grass, sedges, seeds, fruit, insects, crustaceans, and small fish	LC Unknown
Talamancan rice rat	T. talamancae (Allen, 1891)	Central America and northwestern South America	Size: 12–16 cm (5–6 in) long, plus 10–16 cm (4–6 in) tail Habitat: Forest and other Diet: Grass, sedges, seeds, fruit, insects, crustaceans, and small fish	LC Unknown

Genus Wiedomys – Hershkovitz, 1959 – two species
Common name	Scientific name and subspecies	Range	Size and ecology	IUCN status and estimated population
Cerrado red-nosed mouse	W. cerradensis Gonçalves, Almeida, & Bonvicino, 2005	Eastern Brazil	Size: 10–11 cm (4 in) long, plus 14–17 cm (6–7 in) tail Habitat: Forest and shrubland Diet: Seeds and insects	DD Unknown
Red-nosed mouse	W. pyrrhorhinos (Wied-Neuwied, 1820)	Eastern Brazil	Size: 10–12 cm (4–5 in) long, plus 11–19 cm (4–7 in) tail Habitat: Shrubland, savanna, and grassland Diet: Seeds and insects	LC Unknown

Genus Wilfredomys – Avila-Pires, 1960 – one species
Common name	Scientific name and subspecies	Range	Size and ecology	IUCN status and estimated population
Greater Wilfred's mouse	W. oenax (Thomas, 1928)	Southeastern South America	Size: 11–13 cm (4–5 in) long, plus 16–21 cm (6–8 in) tail Habitat: Forest Diet: Vegetation, seeds, and insects	EN Unknown

Genus Zygodontomys – Allen, 1897 – two species
Common name	Scientific name and subspecies	Range	Size and ecology	IUCN status and estimated population
Brown cane mouse	Z. brunneus Thomas, 1898	Western Colombia	Size: 13–16 cm (5–6 in) long, plus 11–12 cm (4–5 in) tail Habitat: Grassland and inland wetlands Diet: Seeds, grass, and fruit	LC Unknown
Short-tailed cane mouse	Z. brevicauda Allen & Chapman, 1893	Southern Central America and northern South America	Size: 14–17 cm (6–7 in) long, plus 10–12 cm (4–5 in) tail Habitat: Savanna, forest, inland wetlands, and grassland Diet: Seeds, grass, and fruit	LC Unknown

== Sources ==
- Chernasky, Amy; Motis, Anna; Burgin, Connor, eds. (2023). All the Mammals of the World. Lynx Nature Books. ISBN 978-84-16728-66-4.
- Nowak, Ronald M. (1999). Walker's Mammals of the World. Vol. 2 (6th ed.). Johns Hopkins University Press. ISBN 978-0-8018-5789-8.
- Musser, Guy G.; Carleton, Michael D. (2005). Wilson, Don E.; Reeder, DeeAnn M. (eds.). Mammal Species of the World. Vol. 2 (3rd ed.). Johns Hopkins University Press. ISBN 978-0-8018-8221-0.
