= Shrew mouse =

Shrew mouse, shrew-mouse or shrewmouse may refer to:

- Shrews, family Soricidae;
- Various rodents thought to resemble shrews:
  - Members of the genus Pseudohydromys, from New Guinea;
  - Members of the genus Microhydromys, also from New Guinea;
  - Members of the genus Archboldomys, from the Philippines;
  - Members of the genus Crunomys, from the Philippines and Sulawesi (also known as "shrew rats");
  - Gairdner's Shrewmouse, Mus pahari, from southern and southeastern Asia;
  - The Brazilian Shrew-mouse, Blarinomys breviceps, from South America.
