= Roraima mouse =

Conservation status
- Vulnerable (IUCN 3.1)

Scientific classification
- Kingdom: Animalia
- Phylum: Chordata
- Class: Mammalia
- Order: Rodentia
- Family: Cricetidae
- Subfamily: Sigmodontinae
- Tribe: Akodontini
- Genus: Podoxymys; Anthony, 1929
- Species: P. roraimae

Binomial name
- Podoxymys roraimae Anthony, 1929

Species of rodent

The Roraima mouse (Podoxymys roraimae) is a species of rodent in the family Cricetidae. It is the only species in the genus Podoxymys. It is found only in Guyana.

== Sources ==
- Musser, G. G.; Carleton, M. D. (2005). "Superfamily Muroidea". In Wilson, D. E.; Reeder, D. M. (eds.). Mammal Species of the World: A Taxonomic and Geographic Reference (3rd ed.). Johns Hopkins University Press. pp. 894–1531. ISBN 978-0-8018-8221-0. OCLC 62265494.
