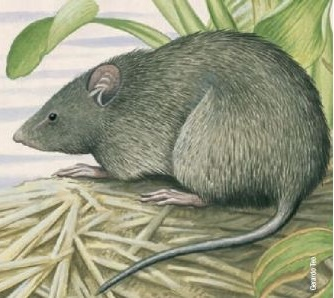
- Gyldenstolpia fronto

Scientific classification
- Domain: Eukaryota
- Kingdom: Animalia
- Phylum: Chordata
- Class: Mammalia
- Order: Rodentia
- Family: Cricetidae
- Subfamily: Sigmodontinae
- Tribe: Akodontini
- Genus: Gyldenstolpia; Pardiñas, D'Elía & Teta, 2008

= Gyldenstolpia =

Genus of rodents

Gyldenstolpia is a genus of rodents belonging to the family Cricetidae.

Species:

- Gyldenstolpia fronto (Winge, 1887)
- Gyldenstolpia planaltensis (Avila-Pires, 1972)
