= Delicate salt flat mouse =

Conservation status
- Data Deficient (IUCN 3.1)

Scientific classification
- Kingdom: Animalia
- Phylum: Chordata
- Class: Mammalia
- Order: Rodentia
- Family: Cricetidae
- Subfamily: Sigmodontinae
- Tribe: Phyllotini
- Genus: Salinomys; Braun & Mares, 1995
- Species: S. delicatus

Binomial name
- Salinomys delicatus Braun & Mares, 1995

Species of rodent

The delicate salt flat mouse (Salinomys delicatus; Spanish: el ratón delicado de los salares) is a sigmodontine rodent species in the family Cricetidae from South America. It is the only species in the genus Salinomys. Its habitat is scrublands bordering salt flats (such as those of the Salinas Grandes) in the Monte Desert area of central western Argentina at elevations around 400 m. The closest relatives of the species are the chaco mice (Andalgalomys).

== Karyotype ==
Its karyotype has 2n = 18 and FN = 32 in females but has 2n = 19 in males. Due to an X-autosome translocation, S. delicatus has an XY_{1}Y_{2} sex chromosome system, rare in mammals. During meiotic prophase, a male's X and two Y chromosomes form a trivalent. The female value of 18 is the lowest diploid number of any species in the tribe Phyllotini. Given that close relative Andalgalomys pearsoni has the highest known diploid number (78) of the tribe, it appears that major chromosome restructuring occurred during the evolution of the Andalgalomys-Salinomys clade.

== Conservation status ==
While not formally assessing its conservation status, the IUCN has stated, "This species occurs in a very narrow range of ecological requirements (salt flats) which are severely fragmented and which could be threatened by human disturbance."
