= Primordial tapecua =

Conservation status
- Least Concern (IUCN 3.1)

Scientific classification
- Kingdom: Animalia
- Phylum: Chordata
- Class: Mammalia
- Order: Rodentia
- Family: Cricetidae
- Subfamily: Sigmodontinae
- Tribe: Phyllotini
- Genus: Tapecomys; S. Anderson and Yates, 2000
- Species: T. primus

Binomial name
- Tapecomys primus Anderson and Yates, 2000

Species of rodent

The primordial tapecua (Tapecomys primus) is a species of medium-sized rodent in the family Cricetidae. The type locality is in southeastern Bolivia. It is the only known species in the genus Tapecomys. Two specimens were found in 1991 in a forested region at an elevation of 1500 m near the village of Tapecua in the Tarija Department of Bolivia. A few additional specimens have been found since, from the type locality and from a location in Jujuy Province, northern Argentina.

The holotype is held at the Museum of Southwestern Biology at the University of New Mexico MSB:Mamm:239826
