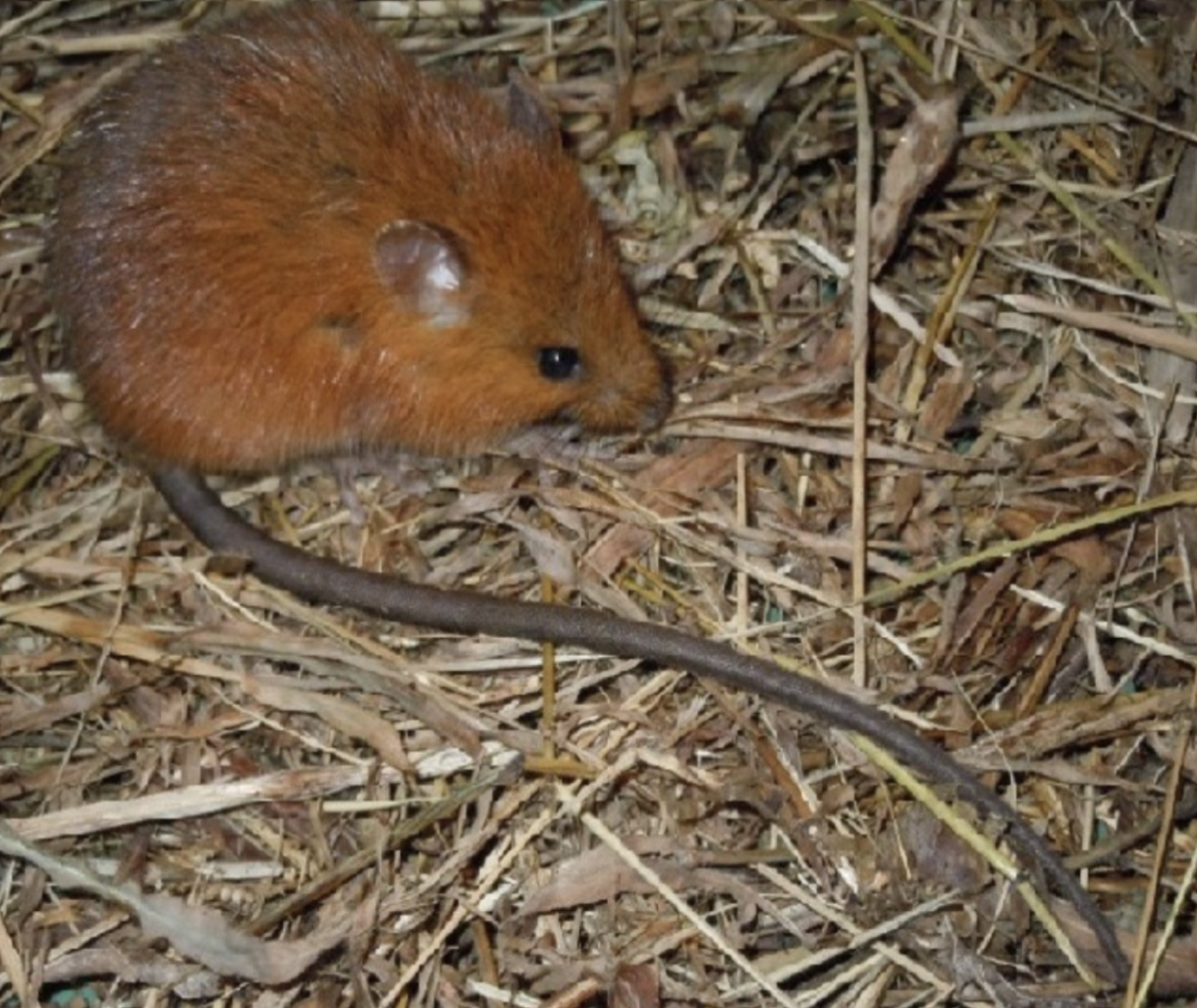

Conservation status
- Endangered (IUCN 3.1)

Scientific classification
- Kingdom: Animalia
- Phylum: Chordata
- Class: Mammalia
- Order: Rodentia
- Family: Cricetidae
- Subfamily: Sigmodontinae
- Tribe: Thomasomyini
- Genus: Phaenomys; Thomas, 1917
- Species: P. ferrugineus

Binomial name
- Phaenomys ferrugineus (Thomas, 1894)

= Rio de Janeiro arboreal rat =

Species of rodent

The Rio de Janeiro arboreal rat (Phaenomys ferrugineus) is a rodent species from South America. It is found in Brazil. It is the only species in the genus Phaenomys.
