= Altiplano chinchilla mouse =

Conservation status
- Least Concern (IUCN 3.1)

Scientific classification
- Kingdom: Animalia
- Phylum: Chordata
- Class: Mammalia
- Order: Rodentia
- Family: Cricetidae
- Subfamily: Sigmodontinae
- Tribe: Phyllotini
- Genus: Chinchillula; Thomas, 1898
- Species: C. sahamae

Binomial name
- Chinchillula sahamae Thomas, 1898
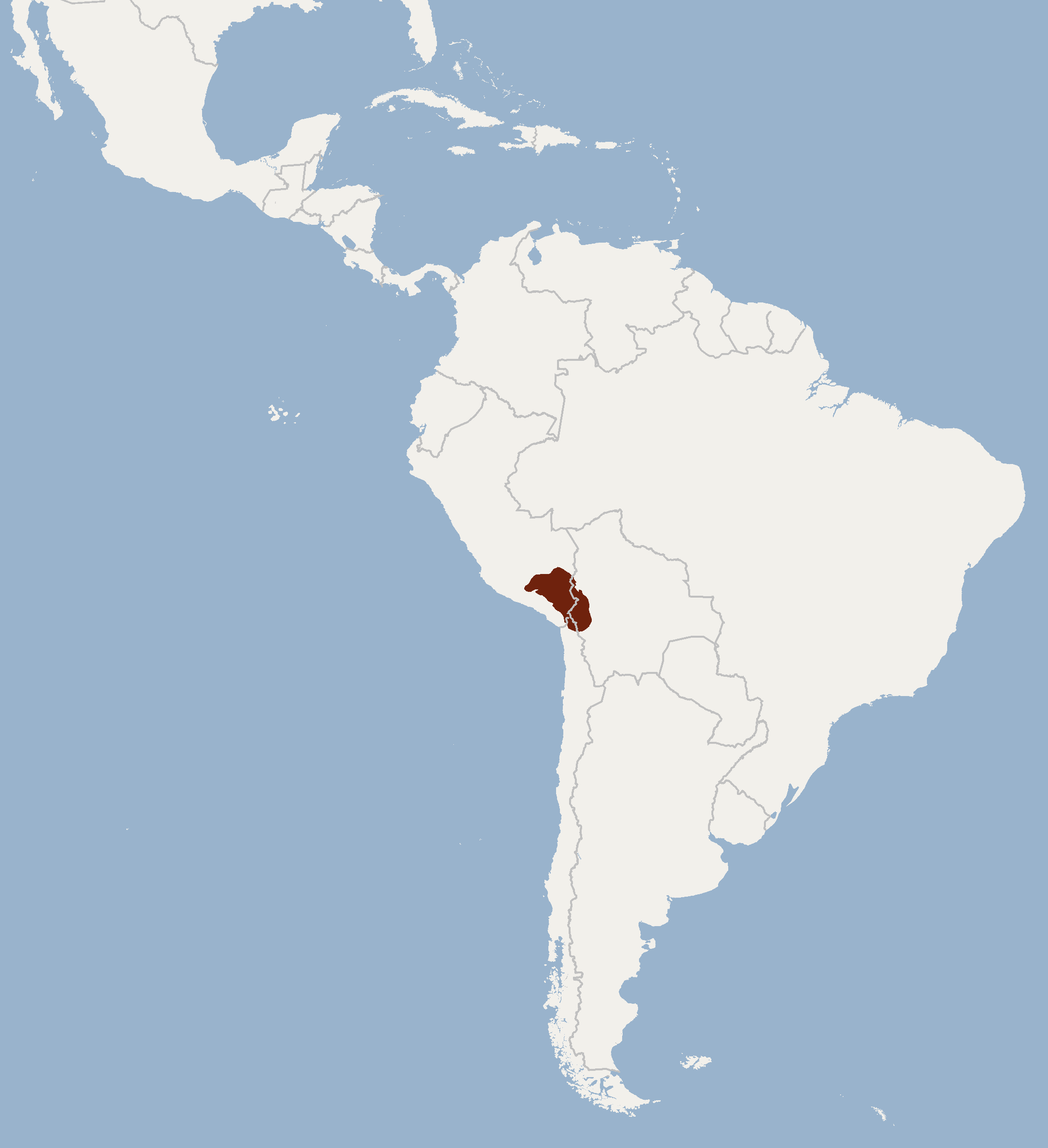
- Distribution of Chinchillula sahamae according to Eisenberg & Redford, 2000

Species of rodent

The Altiplano chinchilla mouse or achallo (Chinchillula sahamae) is a species of rodent in the family Cricetidae. It is the only species in the genus Chinchillula. It is found in Argentina, Bolivia, Chile, and Peru.
