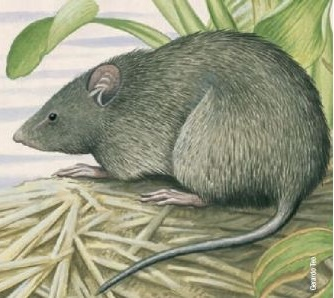
- Illustration

Conservation status
- Critically endangered, possibly extinct (IUCN 3.1)

Scientific classification
- Kingdom: Animalia
- Phylum: Chordata
- Class: Mammalia
- Order: Rodentia
- Family: Cricetidae
- Subfamily: Sigmodontinae
- Genus: Gyldenstolpia
- Species: G. fronto

Binomial name
- Gyldenstolpia fronto (Winge, 1888)

Synonyms
- Kunsia fronto (Winge, 1888)

= Fossorial giant rat =

Species of rodent

The fossorial giant rat (Gyldenstolpia fronto) is a species of rodent in the family Cricetidae. It is found in Argentina and Brazil but was determined extinct following a recent assessment of the conservation status of sigmodontine rodents. Its natural habitat is assumed to be dry savanna, but there have been no ecological details reported.

== Taxonomy ==
Gyldenstolpia fronto is one of two species in the genus Gyldenstolpia. The other, smaller, species in the genus is G. planaltensis. In 2009, Gyldenstolpia fronto chacoensis and G. fronto fronto were acknowledge by Pardinãs, D'Elía, and Teta as two subspecies of G. fronto.

It was previously considered part of the genus Kunsia but is now recognized in the genus Gyldenstolpia, a subset of sigmodontine rodents known only from a few fossils and recent specimens found in central South America. The two species of Gyldenstolpia are relatively large in relation to other sigmodontines; G. fronto is the larger of the two and displays a semi-fossorial body plan.

== Morphology ==
Members of genus Gyldenstolpia are morphologically similar to Scapteromys and Kunsia. Defining characteristics of G. fronto include a robust skull with a restricted interorbital region; rounded, somewhat hidden ears; thick bristle-like dorsal hair, small eyes, and a short tail relative to overall body length.
