= Garlepp's mouse =

Conservation status
- Data Deficient (IUCN 3.1)

Scientific classification
- Kingdom: Animalia
- Phylum: Chordata
- Class: Mammalia
- Order: Rodentia
- Family: Cricetidae
- Subfamily: Sigmodontinae
- Tribe: Phyllotini
- Genus: Galenomys; Thomas, 1916
- Species: G. garleppi

Binomial name
- Galenomys garleppi (Thomas, 1898)

Species of rodent

Garlepp's mouse (Galenomys garleppi) is a species of rodent in the family Cricetidae. It is the only species in the genus Galenomys. It is found in western Bolivia, southern Peru and possibly Chile at elevations over 3,000 m in the Altiplano.
