= Brazilian shrew mouse =

Brazilian shrew mouse Temporal range: Pleistocene – Recent

Conservation status
- Least Concern (IUCN 3.1)

Scientific classification
- Kingdom: Animalia
- Phylum: Chordata
- Class: Mammalia
- Order: Rodentia
- Family: Cricetidae
- Subfamily: Sigmodontinae
- Tribe: Akodontini
- Genus: Blarinomys; Thomas, 1896
- Species: B. breviceps

Binomial name
- Blarinomys breviceps (Winge, 1888)

Species of rodent

The Brazilian shrew mouse (Blarinomys breviceps), also known as the blarinine akodont, is a rodent in the tribe Akodontini from the Atlantic Forest of eastern and southeastern Brazil. It is the only species in the genus Blarinomys. Phylogenetic analysis suggest that there are two clear geographical clades, a northeastern and southeastern.

== Morphology ==
The appearance of the Brazilian shrew mouse is often compared to that of small insectivorous shrews or moles with small, reduced eyes, short ears and tail, and short, soft fur. Its mole-like appearance contributes to its ability to be differentiated from other rodents in its Neotropical habitat. Overall, its specialized body structure lends itself to the animal's subterranean life, with broad forefeet and large claws for digging. It has a long snout that is used to find insects in the ground and highly developed jaw muscles that help to close the mouth quickly, as to avoid swallowing dirt. The species has demonstrated sexual dimorphism in that females are usually slightly larger than males.

== Lifespan ==
The average lifespan of the Brazilian shrew mouse is unknown, as they are difficult to find. Captive specimens tend to refuse food and die shortly after capture. It is generally assumed that the species' lifespan is similar to other sigmodontine rodents, which is typically less than one year.

== Diet ==
Very little is known about the diet of B. breviceps, however it is assumed to be primarily insectivorous. When studied in captivity, many specimens refuse food and die within a few days. However, some captive organisms have been shown to eat a variety of insects including crickets, moths and butterflies, and roaches. Overall, they tend to refuse other food sources such as fruits or seeds.

== Conservation status ==
According to the International Union for Conservation of Nature's Red List of Endangered Species, the Brazilian shrew mouse is considered of least concern. However, some experts suggest that since the species is so difficult to find, data is insufficient to confidently label their conservation status.

== Literature cited ==
- Musser, G. G.; Carleton, M. D. (2005). "Superfamily Muroidea". In Wilson, D. E.; Reeder, D. M. (eds.). Mammal Species of the World: A Taxonomic and Geographic Reference (3rd ed.). Johns Hopkins University Press. pp. 894–1531. ISBN 978-0-8018-8221-0. OCLC 62265494.
