= Thomasomys ucucha =

Conservation status
- Vulnerable (IUCN 3.1)

Scientific classification
- Kingdom: Animalia
- Phylum: Chordata
- Class: Mammalia
- Order: Rodentia
- Family: Cricetidae
- Subfamily: Sigmodontinae
- Genus: Thomasomys
- Species: T. ucucha

Binomial name
- Thomasomys ucucha Voss, 2003
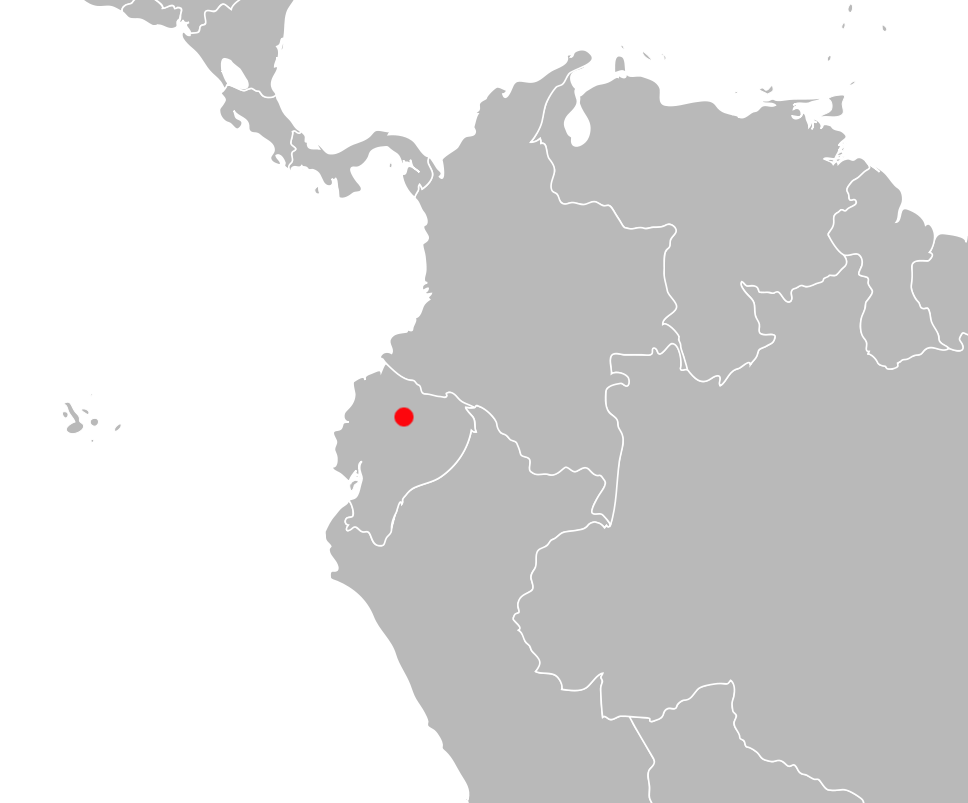

Species of rodent from Ecuador

Thomasomys ucucha, also known as the ucucha thomasomys, is a rodent in the genus Thomasomys of the family Cricetidae. It is known only from high altitude forest and grassland habitats in the Cordillera Oriental of Ecuador. Seven other species of Thomasomys live in the same areas. First collected in 1903, T. ucucha was formally described as a new species in 2003 and most closely resembles T. hylophilus, which occurs further to the north. The species is listed as "vulnerable" in the IUCN Red List as a result of habitat destruction.

Medium-sized, dark-furred, and long-tailed, T. ucucha can be distinguished from all other species of Thomasomys by its large, broad, procumbent upper incisors. Head and body length is 94 to 119 mm (3.7 to 4.7 in) and body mass is 24 to 46 g (0.85 to 1.62 oz). The tail is scarcely furred. The front part of the skull is flat, short, and broad. The incisive foramina, openings at the front of the palate, are short, and the palate itself is broad and smooth. The root of the lower incisor is contained in a prominent capsular process.

== Taxonomy ==
The first three specimens of Thomasomys ucucha were collected in 1903 at Tablón in Pichincha Province, Ecuador, by L. Söderström. It was not found again until Robert S. Voss of the American Museum of Natural History collected a total of forty-three specimens at nearby Papallacta, Napo Province, in 1978 and 1980 (the type locality is described as the valley of the Rio Papallacta). Papallacta is in a remote area that is difficult to access, and the mammal fauna of the region remains poorly known. In 2003, he formally described the animal as a new species, Thomasomys ucucha, in a publication in American Museum Novitates in which he also reviewed the mammal fauna of Papallacta. The generic name, Thomasomys, honors English zoologist Oldfield Thomas, who named about 2,900 taxa of mammals, and the specific name, ucucha, is the local Quechua word for "mouse". T. ucucha most closely resembles T. hylophilus, which is found further north in Colombia and Venezuela. A comparison of mitochondrial DNA found that T. ucucha was closest to specimens identified as T. caudivarius and T. silvestris, but T. hylophilus was not included in this study. All are members of Thomasomys, a diverse genus that occurs in the northern Andes, from Bolivia to Venezuela. Together with Rhipidomys and a few other, smaller genera, Thomasomys forms the tribe Thomasomyini, which includes over fifty species found in South America and Panama. Thomasomyini in turn is part of the subfamily Sigmodontinae of the family Cricetidae, along with hundreds of other species of mainly small rodents.

== Description ==
Thomasomys ucucha is a medium-sized Thomasomys with a relatively long tail. The dense, fine, and soft fur is dark brown on the upperparts, changing gradually into the grey underparts. The mystacial vibrissae (whiskers above the mouth) are long and extend beyond the ears when laid back against the head. Sparse short, dark hairs are present on the ears. The digits and metapodials (bones of the centers of the hand and feet) of the hands and feet are covered with dark hairs, but the ungual tufts at the bases of the claws consist of longer, gray hairs. The fifth digit of the foot is long, with the tip of its claw almost reaching the base of the claw of the fourth digit. The tail is dark and hardly furred, except for a pencil of long hairs at the end; some animals have a white tail tip. Females have six mammae. In thirty-six specimens, head and body length is 94 to 119 mm (3.7 to 4.7 in), averaging 110 mm (4.3 in); tail length is 122 to 151 mm (4.8 to 5.9 in), averaging 140 mm (5.5 in); hindfoot length is 26 to 30 mm (1.0 to 1.2 in), averaging 28 mm (1.1 in); ear length is 17 to 20 mm (0.67 to 0.79 in), averaging 18 mm (0.71 in); and weight is 24 to 46 g (0.85 to 1.62 oz), averaging 36 g (1.3 oz).

The front (rostral) part of the skull is short—shorter and broader than in T. hylophilus—and flat and the notches in the zygomatic plates at the sides are poorly developed. The plates themselves are broad. The zygomatic arches (cheekbones) spread broadly and are rounded in shape. The narrow interorbital region (between the eyes) is hourglass-shaped. The braincase is robust.

The incisive foramina, which perforate the palate between the incisors and the molars, are short and do not reach near the first molars; they are longer in T. hylophilus. They are widest where the premaxillary and maxillary bones meet. The palate itself is also short, not extending beyond the third molars, and is broad and lacks ridges or grooves. There are simple posterolateral palatal pits at the back of the palate, near the third molars. The mesopterygoid fossa, an opening located behind the end of the palate, is broad and its roof is either fully ossified or perforated by small sphenopalatine vacuities where the presphenoid and basisphenoid bones meet. An alisphenoid strut separates two foramina (openings) at the base of the skull, the buccinator-masticatory foramen and the foramen ovale accessorium. The pattern of grooves and foramina on the head indicates that the circulation of the arteries in the head of T. ucucha follows the primitive pattern. The tegmen tympani, the roof of the tympanic cavity, overlaps the suspensory process of the squamosal bone. At the back of the mandible (lower jaw), there is a capsular process to receive the root of the lower incisor, which is absent in T. hylophilus.

The large upper incisors are orthodont, with their cutting edge at about a right angle to the upper molars, and heavily pigmented with orange. Those of T. hylophilus are narrower, less procumbent, and less pigmented. The orthodont upper incisors suffice to distinguish T. ucucha from all other members of the genus but T. australis and T. daphne, which have much shorter and narrower incisors. The left and right molar rows are parallel. The molars are more hypsodont (high-crowned) than in other Thomasomys. The anterocone, the cusp at the front of the first upper molar, is divided into distinct cuspules at the lingual (inner) and labial (outer) sides by an anteromedian flexus. The accessory ridges on the upper molars, the anterolophs and mesolophs, are less well-developed than in T. hylophilus. The third upper molar is reduced relative to the second, much more so than in T. hylophilus. The lower molars are generally similar to the uppers, but the anteroconid (the equivalent of the anterocone on the first lower molar) is often undivided and the third molar is unreduced.

The glans penis is rounded, short, and small and is superficially divided into left and right halves by a trough at the top and a ridge at the bottom. Most of the glans is covered with penile spines, except for an area near the tip.

== Distribution and ecology ==
Thomasomys ucucha occurs only in the Cordillera Oriental of Ecuador in the provinces of Pichincha, Napo, and Carchi. At Papallacta, Thomasomys ucucha was collected in a variety of habitats at 3,380 to 3,720 m (11,090 to 12,200 ft) altitude, including páramo (high-mountain grassland with shrubs and forest patches) and subalpine rainforest. Most were taken in runways (paths through vegetation made by animals) and a few alongside small streams or on a low tree. At Guandera Biological Reserve in Carchi, the species has been found at a slightly lower elevation, 3,340 m (10,960 ft). Other muroid rodents found at the same places as T. ucucha include two akodontines (grass mice), Akodon latebricola and Akodon mollis; two ichthyomyines (water rats), Anotomys leander and Neusticomys monticolus; two oryzomyines (rice rats), Microryzomys altissimus and M. minutus; the thomasomyine Chilomys instans; and five other species of Thomasomys, T. aureus, T. baeops, T. cinnameus, T. erro, and T. paramorum. Other species have been recorded nearby, and Voss wrote that T. ucucha may occur sympatrically with seven other species of Thomasomys. With Akodon latebricola and Thomasomys erro, T. ucucha is one of three species that are known only from the northeastern Andes of Ecuador.

== Conservation status ==
Thomasomys ucucha is locally common, but has a very limited known distribution. Its conservation status has been assessed as "vulnerable" by the IUCN because of its highly localized distribution; it may be threatened by the destruction of its habitat for agricultural purposes, but occurs near or in several protected areas.

== Literature cited ==
- Barriga, C.; Pacheco, V. (2018). "Thomasomys ucucha". IUCN Red List of Threatened Species. 2018 e.T136487A22366894. IUCN. doi:10.2305/IUCN.UK.2018-1.RLTS.T136487A22366894.en.
- Beolens, B.; Watkins, M.; Grayson, M. (28 September 2009). The Eponym Dictionary of Mammals. The Johns Hopkins University Press. pp. 410–411. ISBN 978-0-8018-9304-9. OCLC 270129903.
- Lee, T.E.; Ritchie, A.R.; Vaca-Puente, S.; Brokaw, J.M.; Camacho, M.A.; Burneo, S.F. (2015). "Small mammals of Guandera Biological Reserve, Carchi Province, Ecuador and comparative Andean small mammal ecology" (PDF). Occasional Papers, Museum of Texas Tech University. 334: 1–17.
- Musser, G. G.; Carleton, M. D. (2005). "Superfamily Muroidea". In Wilson, D. E.; Reeder, D. M. (eds.). Mammal Species of the World: A Taxonomic and Geographic Reference (3rd ed.). Johns Hopkins University Press. p. 1184. ISBN 978-0-8018-8221-0. OCLC 62265494.
- Tirira, D. (2007). Guía de campo de los mamíferos del Ecuador (in Spanish). Quito: Ediciones Murciélago Blanco, publicación especial sobre los mamíferos del Ecuador 6. ISBN 978-9978-44-651-5. (partial PDF).
- Voss, R.S (2003). "A new species of Thomasomys (Rodentia: Muridae) from eastern Ecuador, with remarks on mammalian diversity and biogeography in the Cordillera Oriental". American Museum Novitates (3421): 1–47. doi:10.1206/0003-0082(2003)421<0001:ansotr>2.0.co;2. hdl:2246/2850. S2CID 62795333.
