= Thomasomys pagaibambensis =

Scientific classification
- Kingdom: Animalia
- Phylum: Chordata
- Class: Mammalia
- Order: Rodentia
- Family: Cricetidae
- Subfamily: Sigmodontinae
- Genus: Thomasomys
- Species: T. pagaibambensis

Binomial name
- Thomasomys pagaibambensis Pacheco & Ruelas, 2023

Species of rodent

Thomasomys pagaibambensis is a species of rodent in the genus Thomasomys known from the Andes of northern Peru. It consists of populations that were identified as Thomasomys cinereus until they were identified as a new species in 2023.

The species occurs in montane forests of the Pagaibamba Protection Forest in northern Peru, at an elevation of 2,530 to 3,370 metres (8,300 to 11,060 ft). The scientific name refers to the name Pagaibamba. Three other species of Thomasomys are known from the area, T. taczanowskii, T. pyrrhonotus, and a species tentatively identified as T. aureus. The animal eats insects and seeds.

Thomasomys pagaibambensis is medium in size for its genus, with a head-body length of 121 to 158 millimetres (4.8 to 6.2 in). Characteristic traits include brownish fur, a long, one-colored tail with a white tip, and relatively short incisive foramina, an opening in the palate.

== See also ==
- List of living mammal species described in the 2020s
