= Thomasomys auricularis =

Conservation status
- Data Deficient (IUCN 3.1)

Scientific classification
- Kingdom: Animalia
- Phylum: Chordata
- Class: Mammalia
- Order: Rodentia
- Family: Cricetidae
- Subfamily: Sigmodontinae
- Genus: Thomasomys
- Species: T. auricularis

Binomial name
- Thomasomys auricularis (Anthony, 1923)

Species of rodent

Thomasomys auricularis commonly known as the red Andean thomasomys is a species of rodent in the genus Thomasomys found in the western Andes of southwestern Ecuador.

== Taxonomy ==
Although described in 1923 by Harold Elmer Anthony, T. auricularis was treated as synonym or subspecies of Thomasomys pyrrhonotus until they were identified as a separate species in 2003 and officially recognized in Mammal Species of the World (2005).

== Description ==
Thomasomys auricularis is medium in size for its genus, with a head-body length of 138 to 155 millimetres (5.4 to 6.1 in). It is characterized by its relatively long tail, moderately long hindfoot, large skull, and large, inflated auditory bullae. Initially it was compared to the similar looking T. aureus and T. pyrrhonotus but has a few distinguishing characteristics. The skull is smaller than T. aureus. The tail is longer than T. pyrrhonotus. The auditory bullae is larger T. aureus but comparatively smaller than T. pyrrhonotus.

== Distribution ==
The species occurs in Polylepis forest within the páramo and montane forests primarily in region 6 and 7 of Ecuador, at medium and high elevations of 2,330 to 4,000 metres (7,640 to 13,120 ft).

There is a distinct population in Cañar that potentially may be a subspecies or separate species.

== Status ==
Thomasomys auricularis is listed as data deficient by the International Union for Conservation of Nature in due to a lack of general knowledge.
