= Thomasomys shallqukucha =

Scientific classification
- Kingdom: Animalia
- Phylum: Chordata
- Class: Mammalia
- Order: Rodentia
- Family: Cricetidae
- Subfamily: Sigmodontinae
- Genus: Thomasomys
- Species: T. shallqukucha

Binomial name
- Thomasomys shallqukucha Pacheco & Ruelas, 2023

Species of rodent

Thomasomys shallqukucha is a species of rodent in the genus Thomasomys known from the Andes of northern Peru. It consists of populations that were identified as Thomasomys cinereus until they were identified as a new species in 2023.

The species occurs in montane forests of a small area of the Department of Lambayeque in northern Peru, at an elevation of 2,550 to 3,330 metres (8,370 to 10,930 ft). The animal eats insects and seeds. The scientific name comes from the local dialect of the Quechua language and combines the words shallqua, referring to the Jalca biome, and ukucha for "rodent" (compare the Ecuadorian species Thomasomys ucucha).

Thomasomys shallqukucha is medium in size for its genus, with a head-body length of 116 to 142 millimetres (4.6 to 5.6 in). Characteristic traits include dark brownish fur, dark surfaces of the feet, a long, one-colored tail, and relatively short incisive foramina, an opening in the palate.

== See also ==
- List of living mammal species described in the 2020s
