= Colombian forest mouse =

Conservation status
- Least Concern (IUCN 3.1)

Scientific classification
- Kingdom: Animalia
- Phylum: Chordata
- Class: Mammalia
- Infraclass: Placentalia
- Order: Rodentia
- Family: Cricetidae
- Subfamily: Sigmodontinae
- Tribe: Thomasomyini
- Genus: Chilomys; Thomas, 1897
- Species: C. instans

Binomial name
- Chilomys instans (Thomas, 1895)

Species of rodent

The Colombian forest mouse (Chilomys instans) is a species of rodent in the family Cricetidae. Some authorities consider it to be the only species in the genus Chilomys, while others accept Chilomys fumeus as being a valid species, and it may form part of a species complex. It is found in Colombia, Ecuador, and Venezuela.

== Description ==
Chilomys instans is very similar to Chilomys fumeus in size and appearance. Both are small sigmodontines, with a head-and-body length of 72 to 102 mm (2.8 to 4.0 in) and a tail length of 102 to 137 mm (4.0 to 5.4 in). The ears are medium-sized and clad in short hairs, and the body fur is woolly and short. The dorsal surface is dark grey to greyish-brown and the underparts are a similar colour. The hind feet are narrow, and the slender tail is clad with short hairs, and often has a white tip. There are three pairs of mammary glands. The chief differences between the two species lies in the morphology of the skull.

== Taxonomy ==
Based on both molecular and morphological studies, C. instans is believed to be most closely related to thomasomyine sigmodontines such as Aepeomys, Rhagomys, Rhipidomys and Thomasomys. The genus' morphology has been described as "peculiar".

== Distribution and habitat ==
The Colombian forest mouse is native to South America. It occurs in mountainous areas of Venezuela, Colombia and Ecuador, in humid forests at altitudes of between 1,000 and 3,700 m (3,300 and 12,100 ft).

== Ecology ==
Little is known of the behaviour. It seems to be nocturnal and lives on the ground where it creates runways among the mosses of the forest floor. Its diet includes insects, worms and plant material, and three new species of beetle have been identified from the stomach contents of this mouse in Colombia. The larger woodland Oldfield mouse (Thomasomys hylophilus) shares its range.

== Status ==
The International Union for Conservation of Nature has rated this species as being of "least concern" on the basis that it has a wide distribution, is presumed to have a large population, occurs in several protected areas, and is not likely to be declining at a sufficient rate to qualify to be listed in a more-threatened category.
