= Thomasomys lojapiuranus =

Scientific classification
- Kingdom: Animalia
- Phylum: Chordata
- Class: Mammalia
- Order: Rodentia
- Family: Cricetidae
- Subfamily: Sigmodontinae
- Genus: Thomasomys
- Species: T. lojapiuranus

Binomial name
- Thomasomys lojapiuranus Pacheco & Ruelas, 2023

Species of rodent

Thomasomys lojapiuranus is a species of rodent in the genus Thomasomys known from Peru and Ecuador. It consists of populations that were identified as Thomasomys cinereus until they were identified as a new species in 2023.

The species occurs in the Department of Piura in northern Peru and the adjacent Loja Province of southern Ecuador. The scientific name combines the names of these two administrative units. It occurs in montane forest at an altitude of up to 3,481 metres (11,421 ft). The lowest elevation record is at 1,198 metres (3,930 ft), but this record is suspect as it is unusually low for Thomasomys and in an unusual habitat. The lowest secure record is at 1,737 metres (5,699 ft).

Characteristic traits include brownish fur on the back, gray or brown fur on the lower side, and long mystacial vibrissae. The tail is slightly longer than the head and body. The rostrum, the front part of the skull, is relatively broad compared to similar species.

== See also ==
- List of living mammal species described in the 2020s
