= Antonio Brack's Oldfield mouse =

Scientific classification
- Kingdom: Animalia
- Phylum: Chordata
- Class: Mammalia
- Order: Rodentia
- Family: Cricetidae
- Subfamily: Sigmodontinae
- Genus: Thomasomys
- Species: T. antoniobracki

Binomial name
- Thomasomys antoniobracki Ruelas & Pacheco, 2021

Species of rodent

Antonio Brack's Oldfield mouse (Thomasomys antoniobracki) is a species of sigmodontine rodent in the family Cricetidae known from Peru. The species is named after Peruvian ecologist Antonio Brack Egg.

== See also ==
- List of living mammal species described in the 2020s
- List of mammals of Peru
