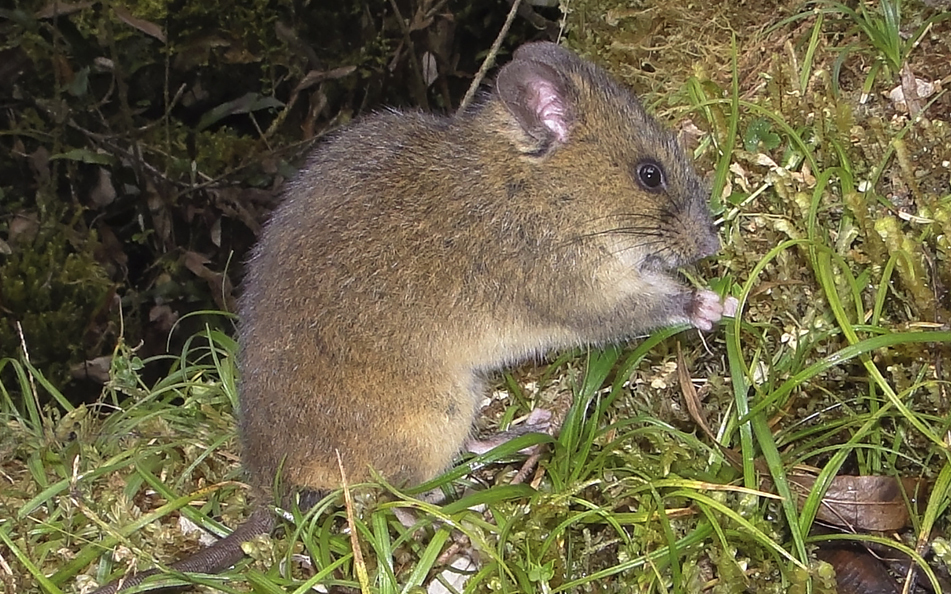
- Adult female before she was collected on 6 October 2016 (MECN 5259)

Scientific classification
- Kingdom: Animalia
- Phylum: Chordata
- Class: Mammalia
- Order: Rodentia
- Family: Cricetidae
- Subfamily: Sigmodontinae
- Genus: Thomasomys
- Species: T. burneoi

Binomial name
- Thomasomys burneoi Lee, Tinoco & Brito, 2022

= Burneo's Oldfield mouse =

Burneo’s Oldfield mouse

Species of rodent

Burneo’s Oldfield mouse (Thomasomys burneoi) is a species of sigmodontine rodent in the family Cricetidae known from Sangay National Park in the eastern Andes, central Ecuador. The species is named after Ecuadorian mammalogist Santiago F. Burneo.

== See also ==
- List of living mammal species described in the 2020s
- List of mammals of Ecuador
