= Pardiñas' Andean mouse =

Pardiñas’ Andean mouse

Scientific classification
- Kingdom: Animalia
- Phylum: Chordata
- Class: Mammalia
- Order: Rodentia
- Family: Cricetidae
- Subfamily: Sigmodontinae
- Genus: Thomasomys
- Species: T. pardignasi

Binomial name
- Thomasomys pardignasi Brito, Vaca-Puente, Koch & Tinoco, 2021

Species of rodent

Pardiñas’ Andean mouse (Thomasomys pardignasi) is a species of sigmodontine rodent in the family Cricetidae known from the Cordillera del Cóndor and Cordillera de Kutukú, Ecuador. The species is named after Argentine palaeontologist Ulyses Pardiñas.

== See also ==
- List of living mammal species described in the 2020s
