= Popayán Oldfield mouse =

Conservation status
- Data Deficient (IUCN 3.1)

Scientific classification
- Kingdom: Animalia
- Phylum: Chordata
- Class: Mammalia
- Order: Rodentia
- Family: Cricetidae
- Subfamily: Sigmodontinae
- Genus: Thomasomys
- Species: T. popayanus

Binomial name
- Thomasomys popayanus J.A. Allen, 1912

Species of rodent

The Popayán Oldfield mouse (Thomasomys popayanus), also called the "Popayán thomasomys", is a species of rodent in the family Cricetidae. It is present in the Andes of southwestern and central western Colombia, at elevations from 1800 to 3200 m. It has been found in páramo, montane forest, and secondary forest. It was formerly considered a subspecies of T. aureus. T. nicefori (Thomas, 1921), presently considered a synonym, will likely be raised to the status of a separate species. The specific name comes from the Colombian city of Popayán.
