= Roig's pericote =

Scientific classification
- Kingdom: Animalia
- Phylum: Chordata
- Class: Mammalia
- Order: Rodentia
- Family: Cricetidae
- Subfamily: Sigmodontinae
- Genus: Andalgalomys
- Species: A. roigi

Binomial name
- Andalgalomys roigi Mares and Braun, 1996

Species of rodent

Roig's pericote or Roig's chaco mouse (Andalgalomys roigi) is a species of rodent in the family Cricetidae. Its karyotype has 2n = 60 and FN = 120. It may be a subspecies of Olrog's chaco mouse.
