= Thomas Lee's rice water rat =

Scientific classification
- Kingdom: Animalia
- Phylum: Chordata
- Class: Mammalia
- Order: Rodentia
- Family: Cricetidae
- Subfamily: Sigmodontinae
- Genus: Tanyuromys
- Species: T. thomasleei

Binomial name
- Tanyuromys thomasleei Timm, Pine and Hanson, 2019

Species of rodent

Thomas Lee's rice water rat (Tanyuromys thomasleei) is a rodent species belonging to the family Cricetidae. It is native exclusively to Ecuador and inhabits middle-elevation forests on the Pacific-facing slopes of the Andes.This species is found in both undisturbed and disturbed forest environments. While similar in appearance to T. aphrastus, Thomas Lee's rice water rat can be distinguished by certain cranial and genetic characteristics.
