= Pichincha Oldfield mouse =

Conservation status
- Least Concern (IUCN 3.1)

Scientific classification
- Kingdom: Animalia
- Phylum: Chordata
- Class: Mammalia
- Order: Rodentia
- Family: Cricetidae
- Subfamily: Sigmodontinae
- Genus: Thomasomys
- Species: T. vulcani

Binomial name
- Thomasomys vulcani (Thomas, 1898)

Species of rodent

The Pichincha Oldfield mouse (Thomasomys vulcani) is a species of rodent in the family Cricetidae. It is present in the Cordillera Occidental of the Andes of Ecuador, where its habitats include shrubby páramo and montane forest. It is nocturnal and terrestrial. The specific and common names are references to the volcano Pichincha, which dominates the city of Quito and on whose slopes the species was discovered at an elevation of 3500 m. The mouse is threatened by conversion of its limited habitat to agricultural use. It has sometimes been considered to be conspecific with Aepeomys lugens.
