= Bogotá grass mouse =

Conservation status
- Least Concern (IUCN 3.1)

Scientific classification
- Kingdom: Animalia
- Phylum: Chordata
- Class: Mammalia
- Order: Rodentia
- Family: Cricetidae
- Subfamily: Sigmodontinae
- Genus: Neomicroxus
- Species: N. bogotensis

Binomial name
- Neomicroxus bogotensis (Thomas, 1895)

Synonyms
- Akodon bogotensis; Microxus bogotensis

Species of rodent

The Bogotá grass mouse or Bogotá akodont, (Neomicroxus bogotensis) is a species of rodent in the family Cricetidae. It is found in the Andes eastern and central Colombia and northwestern Venezuela. Alavarado-Serrano and D'Elía (2013) have assigned the species to a new genus, Neomicroxus along with Neomicroxus latebricola.

== Literature cited ==
- Alavarado-Serrano, D. F. and G. D'Elía (2013). "A new genus for the Andean mice Akodon latebricola and A. bogotensis. (Rodentia: Sigmodontinae)". Journal of Mammalogy. 94 (5): 995–1015. doi:10.1644/12-MAMM-A-276.1. hdl:10533/136796.
- Duff, A. and Lawson, A. (2004). Mammals of the World: A checklist. New Haven: A & C Black. ISBN 0-7136-6021-X.
- Musser, G. G.; Carleton, M. D. (2005). "Superfamily Muroidea". In Wilson, D. E.; Reeder, D. M. (eds.). Mammal Species of the World: A Taxonomic and Geographic Reference (3rd ed.). Johns Hopkins University Press. pp. 894–1531. ISBN 978-0-8018-8221-0. OCLC 62265494.
