= Cajamarca Oldfield mouse =

Conservation status
- Near Threatened (IUCN 3.1)

Scientific classification
- Kingdom: Animalia
- Phylum: Chordata
- Class: Mammalia
- Order: Rodentia
- Family: Cricetidae
- Subfamily: Sigmodontinae
- Genus: Thomasomys
- Species: T. praetor

Binomial name
- Thomasomys praetor (Thomas, 1900)

Species of rodent

The Cajamarca Oldfield mouse (Thomasomys praetor) is a species of rodent in the family Cricetidae. It is present in the Andes of northwestern Peru, where its habitats include shrubby páramo, montane forest, and secondary forest. The rodent is nocturnal and may be partly arboreal. It was formerly considered a subspecies of T. aureus. The common name comes from the Peruvian city and region of Cajamarca.
