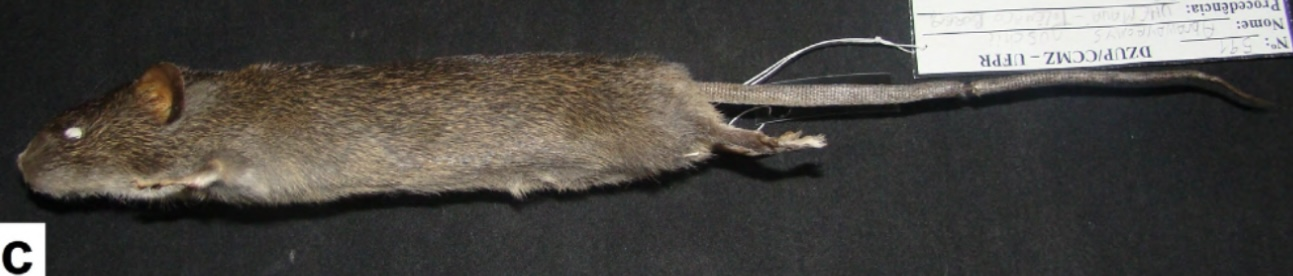

Conservation status
- Least Concern (IUCN 3.1)

Scientific classification
- Kingdom: Animalia
- Phylum: Chordata
- Class: Mammalia
- Infraclass: Placentalia
- Order: Rodentia
- Family: Cricetidae
- Subfamily: Sigmodontinae
- Tribe: Thomasomyini
- Genus: Abrawayaomys; Cunha and Cruz, 1979
- Species: A. ruschii

Binomial name
- Abrawayaomys ruschii Cunha & Cruz, 1979

= Ruschi's rat =

Species of rodent

Ruschi's rat or Ruschi's spiny mouse (Abrawayaomys ruschii) is a rodent species found in Argentina and Brazil. Some cranial features suggest it may be an archaic relative of the paramo Oldfield mouse (Thomasomys paramorum). The upper parts are greyish yellow with a darker head and yellowish-white underparts. Fine hairs are mixed with flattened and grooved spines that are most numerous on the back.

== Taxonomy ==
This rat was first described by Cunha and Cruz in 1979 and is named in honour of the Brazilian naturalist Augusto Ruschi (1915 - 1986).

== Description ==
A medium-sized rodent, Ruschi's rat has a broad head and rounded ears. Adults have a total length of between 200 and 290 mm (7.9 and 11.4 in), about half of which is the tail. The fur is short and dense. Some of the hairs are slender while others are spiny, especially on the back and rump; each spiny hair is flattened and stiff, with a longitudinal groove, and is broadest in the middle. The fur is agouti (banded in light and dark), and there is little difference in shade between the greyish-yellow upper parts of the animal and the slightly paler underparts.

== Distribution ==
Ruschi's rat is native to eastern South America. The type locality is Espírito Santo in southeastern Brazil, and it is also known from several locations in Misiones Province in northeastern Argentina, and from near Rio de Janeiro and in Santa Catarina State. The precise extent of its range is unknown.

== Ecology ==
This species is poorly known. It has been caught in traps set on the ground so it is probably terrestrial rather than arboreal, and this is borne out by its anatomy. Observations of one individual feeding suggests that the diet is mainly fruits, seeds and foliage.

== Status ==
A. ruschii is found in forests in southeastern Brazil and northern Argentina. Although some of the forest is fragmented, the rat has a wide range and no particular threats have been identified. The International Union for Conservation of Nature has assessed its conservation status as being of least concern.
