= Montane Atlantic Forest rat =

Conservation status
- Least Concern (IUCN 3.1)

Scientific classification
- Kingdom: Animalia
- Phylum: Chordata
- Class: Mammalia
- Order: Rodentia
- Family: Cricetidae
- Subfamily: Sigmodontinae
- Genus: Delomys
- Species: D. collinus

Binomial name
- Delomys collinus Thomas, 1917

Species of rodent

The montane Atlantic Forest rat (Delomys collinus) is a South American rodent species of the family Cricetidae. It is endemic to part of the Atlantic Forest region of southeastern Brazil, where it is found at elevations from 1000 to 2700 m in noncontiguous mountain ranges. Its karyotype, like that of closely related Delomys dorsalis, has 2n = 82, but the fundamental numbers of the two species differ. While it is not thought to be in present danger of extinction, habitat destruction and grassland fires are considered to be threats.
