= Hudson's Oldfield mouse =

Conservation status
- Vulnerable (IUCN 3.1)

Scientific classification
- Kingdom: Animalia
- Phylum: Chordata
- Class: Mammalia
- Order: Rodentia
- Family: Cricetidae
- Subfamily: Sigmodontinae
- Genus: Thomasomys
- Species: T. hudsoni

Binomial name
- Thomasomys hudsoni Anthony, 1923

Species of rodent

Hudson's Oldfield mouse (Thomasomys hudsoni) is a species of rodent in the family Cricetidae. It is known only from the Andes in southern Ecuador, where it has been found at an elevation of 3100 m. It was formerly considered a subspecies of T. gracilis. It is named after American zoologist Wilfred Hudson Osgood.
