= Large-eared Oldfield mouse =

Conservation status
- Least Concern (IUCN 3.1)

Scientific classification
- Domain: Eukaryota
- Kingdom: Animalia
- Phylum: Chordata
- Class: Mammalia
- Order: Rodentia
- Family: Cricetidae
- Subfamily: Sigmodontinae
- Genus: Thomasomys
- Species: T. macrotis

Binomial name
- Thomasomys macrotis Gardner & Romo, 1993

Species of rodent

The large-eared Oldfield mouse (Thomasomys macrotis) is a species of rodent in the family Cricetidae. It is known only from a single locality in the Andes in north central Peru (which includes Rio Abiseo National Park), in montane forest at an elevation of 3300 m. It has terrestrial habits and is sympatric with T. apeco.
