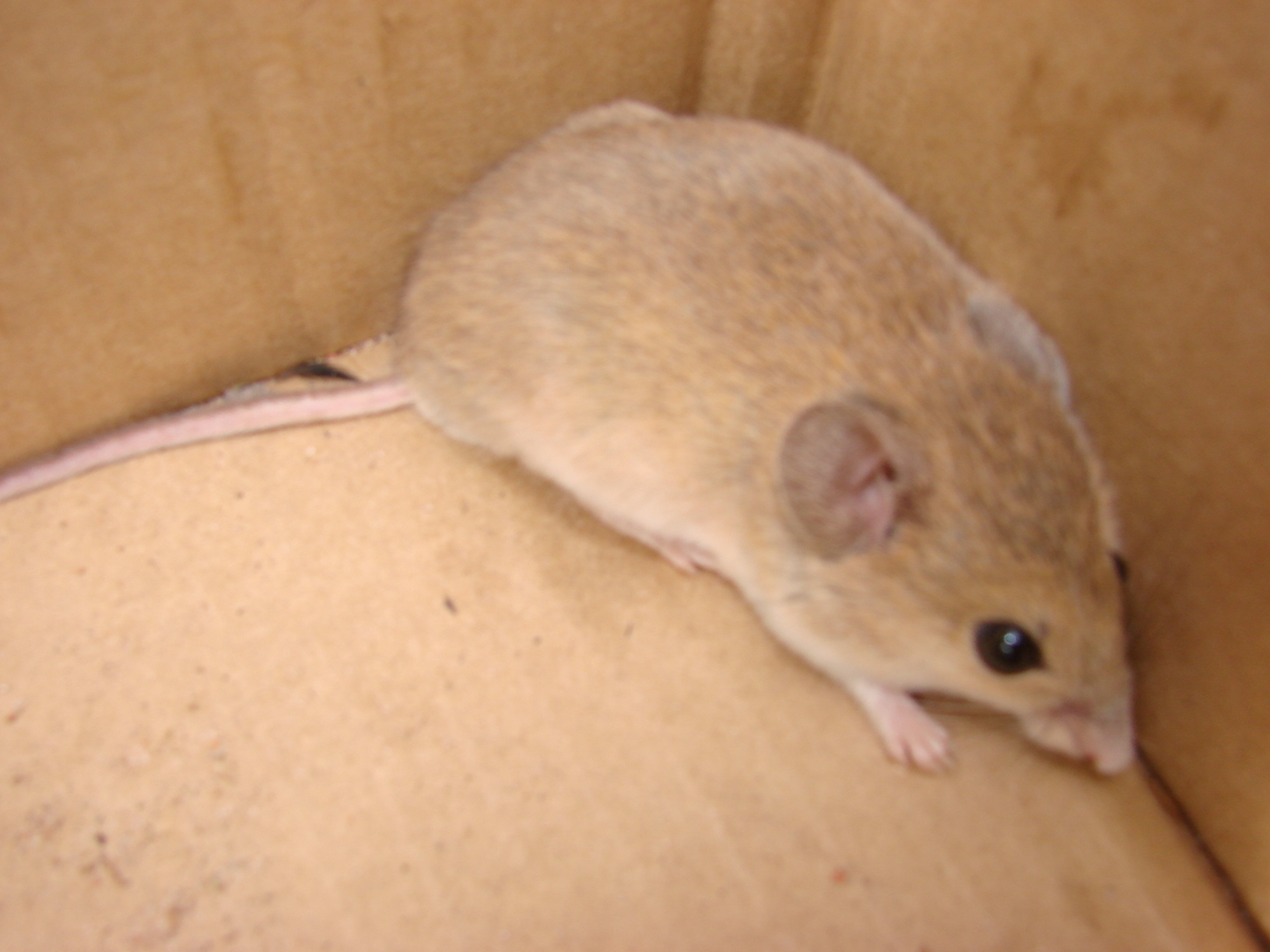
- Thalpomys cerradensis

Scientific classification
- Kingdom: Animalia
- Phylum: Chordata
- Class: Mammalia
- Infraclass: Placentalia
- Order: Rodentia
- Family: Cricetidae
- Subfamily: Sigmodontinae
- Tribe: Akodontini
- Genus: Thalpomys; Thomas, 1916

Type species
- Thalpomys lasiotis Thomas, 1916

Species
- Thalpomys cerradensis Thalpomys lasiotis

= Thalpomys =

Genus of rodents

Thalpomys is a genus of South American rodents in the tribe Akodontini of family Cricetidae. Two species are known, both found in the cerrado tropical savanna ecoregion of central Brazil. They are as follows:

- Cerrado mouse (Thalpomys cerradensis)
- Hairy-eared cerrado mouse (Thalpomys lasiotis)
