= Ash-colored Oldfield mouse =

Conservation status
- Least Concern (IUCN 3.1)

Scientific classification
- Kingdom: Animalia
- Phylum: Chordata
- Class: Mammalia
- Order: Rodentia
- Family: Cricetidae
- Subfamily: Sigmodontinae
- Genus: Thomasomys
- Species: T. cinereus

Binomial name
- Thomasomys cinereus (Thomas, 1882)

Species of rodent

The ash-colored Oldfield mouse (Thomasomys cinereus) is a species of rodent in the genus Thomasomys. It is found in montane forests of the Department of Cajamarca in northern Peru, at elevations of 1,524 to 3,818 metres (5,000 to 12,526 ft). Until 2023, it was thought to be more widely distributed, ranging into southern Ecuador, but these populations are now identified as three separate, closely related species, T. lojapiuranus, T. pagaibambensis, and T. shallqukucha.

With a head-body length of 114 to 148 millimetres (4.5 to 5.8 in), Thomasomys cinereus is a medium-sized species for the genus. Distinguishing characteristics compared to its close relatives include, among others:

- Mystacial vibrissae (whiskers above the mouth) short (long in T. lojapiuranus and T. pagaibambensis)
- Tail shorter than or equal to head and body (longer in the other three species)
- Tail slightly paler above than below (same color above and below in the other species; T. pagaibambensis additionally has a white tail tip)
- Incisive foramina long (short in T. shallqukucha and T. pagaibambensis)
- Auditory bullae small (larger in the other species)
