= Andalgalomys =

Scientific classification
- Domain: Eukaryota
- Kingdom: Animalia
- Phylum: Chordata
- Class: Mammalia
- Order: Rodentia
- Family: Cricetidae
- Subfamily: Sigmodontinae
- Tribe: Phyllotini
- Genus: Andalgalomys; Williams and Mares, 1978

Type species
- Andalgalomys olrogi

Species
- Andalgalomys olrogi Andalgalomys pearsoni Andalaglomys roigi

Genus of rodents

Andalgalomys is a genus of rodent in the family Cricetidae. It contains the following species:

- Olrog's chaco mouse (Andalgalomys olrogi)
- Pearson's chaco mouse (Andalgalomys pearsoni)
- Roig's chaco mouse (Andalgalomys roigi)
