= Calassomys =

Scientific classification
- Kingdom: Animalia
- Phylum: Chordata
- Class: Mammalia
- Order: Rodentia
- Family: Cricetidae
- Subfamily: Sigmodontinae
- Tribe: Phyllotini
- Genus: Calassomys; Pardiñas, Lessa, Teta, Salazar-Bravo & Câmara, 2014
- Species: C. apicalis

Binomial name
- Calassomys apicalis Pardiñas, Lessa, Teta, Salazar-Bravo & Câmara, 2014

Genus of rodents

Calassomys apicalis is the only species of the genus Calassomys, a rodent in the family Cricetidae. It lives in the east of South America.

== Taxonomy ==
This species was originally described, at the same time as its genus, in 2014 by the zoologists Ulyses F.J. Pardiñas, Gisele Lessa, Pablo Teta, Jorge Salazar-Bravo and Edeltrudes M. V. C. Câmara.

Type locality

The type locality is located 3.25 km northeast of Macacos, Pedreira do Gaio, in the state of Minas Gerais, Brazil.

Exemplar type

The holotype is catalogued as MCN / PUC-MG 2785, an adult male (clase desgaste dental 3) (dental wear class 3) of which its skull, part of its postcranial skeleton, and skin (in good condition) have been preserved. Karyotype, suspended cells and tissues were preserved in alcohol. It was collected by E. Câmara and C. Guimarães Costa in November, 2006.

Etymology

Etymologically, the generic name Calassomys is an eponym referring to A. Calaça de Espírito Santo, the father of one of the authors (Edeltrudes M. V. C. Câmara).

The specific name apicalis is derived from Latin and alludes to the animal's characteristic white-tipped tail.

Characterization and phylogenetic relations

It is possible to differentiate this rodent by several characteristics, such as its elongated tail, in which the distal 2.5 to 5 cm are entirely white. Its skull has a domed profile with a long face, and notably small molars. Small, vestigial mesolophs and mesostyles are found on the upper first and second molars (a unique feature within Phyllotini).

Phylogenetic analyses based on nuclear and mitochondrial molecular markers showed that this taxon is the sister of the remaining genera of the tribe Phyllotini indicating that its diversity has expanded towards the northeast, and that an ancient tribal diversification event occurred in eastern Brazil.

== Geographic distribution and habitat ==
This species of rodent is endemic to eastern Brazil, and specifically the Espinhaço Mountains, in Sempre Vivas National Park, at altitudes greater than 1000m above sea level.
