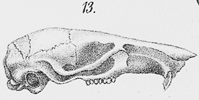
- Cranium of Delomys dorsalis

Scientific classification
- Domain: Eukaryota
- Kingdom: Animalia
- Phylum: Chordata
- Class: Mammalia
- Order: Rodentia
- Family: Cricetidae
- Subfamily: Sigmodontinae
- Tribe: Thomasomyini
- Genus: Delomys; Thomas, 1917

Type species
- Hesperomys dorsalis Hensel, 1873

Species
- Delomys altimontanus Delomys collinus Delomys dorsalis Delomys sublineatus

= Delomys =

Genus of rodents

Delomys is a genus of South American rodents of family Cricetidae. Three species are known, all found in the Atlantic Forest of Argentina and Brazil. They are as follows:

- Delomys altimontanus
- Striped Atlantic Forest rat (Delomys dorsalis)
- Pallid Atlantic Forest rat (Delomys sublineatus)
