= Strong-tailed Oldfield mouse =

Conservation status
- Least Concern (IUCN 3.1)

Scientific classification
- Kingdom: Animalia
- Phylum: Chordata
- Class: Mammalia
- Order: Rodentia
- Family: Cricetidae
- Subfamily: Sigmodontinae
- Genus: Thomasomys
- Species: T. ischyrus

Binomial name
- Thomasomys ischyrus Osgood, 1914

Species of rodent

The strong-tailed Oldfield mouse (Thomasomys ischyrus) is a species of rodent in the family Cricetidae. It is found only in Peru.
