= Pallid Atlantic Forest rat =

Conservation status
- Least Concern (IUCN 3.1)

Scientific classification
- Kingdom: Animalia
- Phylum: Chordata
- Class: Mammalia
- Order: Rodentia
- Family: Cricetidae
- Subfamily: Sigmodontinae
- Genus: Delomys
- Species: D. sublineatus

Binomial name
- Delomys sublineatus Thomas, 1903

Species of rodent

The pallid Atlantic Forest rat (Delomys sublineatus) is a rodent species from South America. It is endemic to the Atlantic Forest of Brazil.
