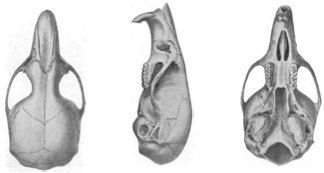
- Holotype skull.

Conservation status
- Vulnerable (IUCN 3.1)

Scientific classification
- Kingdom: Animalia
- Phylum: Chordata
- Class: Mammalia
- Order: Rodentia
- Family: Cricetidae
- Subfamily: Sigmodontinae
- Genus: Thomasomys
- Species: T. monochromos

Binomial name
- Thomasomys monochromos Bangs, 1900

= Unicolored Oldfield mouse =

Species of rodent

The unicolored Oldfield mouse (Thomasomys monochromos) is a species of rodent in the family Cricetidae. It is found only in Colombia.
