= Soft-furred Oldfield mouse =

Conservation status
- Least Concern (IUCN 3.1)

Scientific classification
- Domain: Eukaryota
- Kingdom: Animalia
- Phylum: Chordata
- Class: Mammalia
- Order: Rodentia
- Family: Cricetidae
- Subfamily: Sigmodontinae
- Genus: Thomasomys
- Species: T. laniger

Binomial name
- Thomasomys laniger (Thomas, 1895)

Species of rodent

The soft-furred Oldfield mouse (Thomasomys laniger) is a species of rodent in the family Cricetidae. It is found in Colombia and Venezuela.
