= Pearson's chaco mouse =

Conservation status
- Least Concern (IUCN 3.1)

Scientific classification
- Kingdom: Animalia
- Phylum: Chordata
- Class: Mammalia
- Order: Rodentia
- Family: Cricetidae
- Subfamily: Sigmodontinae
- Genus: Andalgalomys
- Species: A. pearsoni

Binomial name
- Andalgalomys pearsoni (Myers, 1977)

Species of rodent

Pearson's chaco mouse (Andalgalomys pearsoni) is a species of rodent in the family Cricetidae. This mouse is found in the Gran Chaco ecoregion of southeastern Bolivia and western Paraguay at elevations up to 400 m. The species is named after American zoologist Oliver Payne Pearson. Its karyotype has 2n = 76 and 78 in the two subspecies. The latter is the highest diploid number of any species in the tribe Phyllotini.
