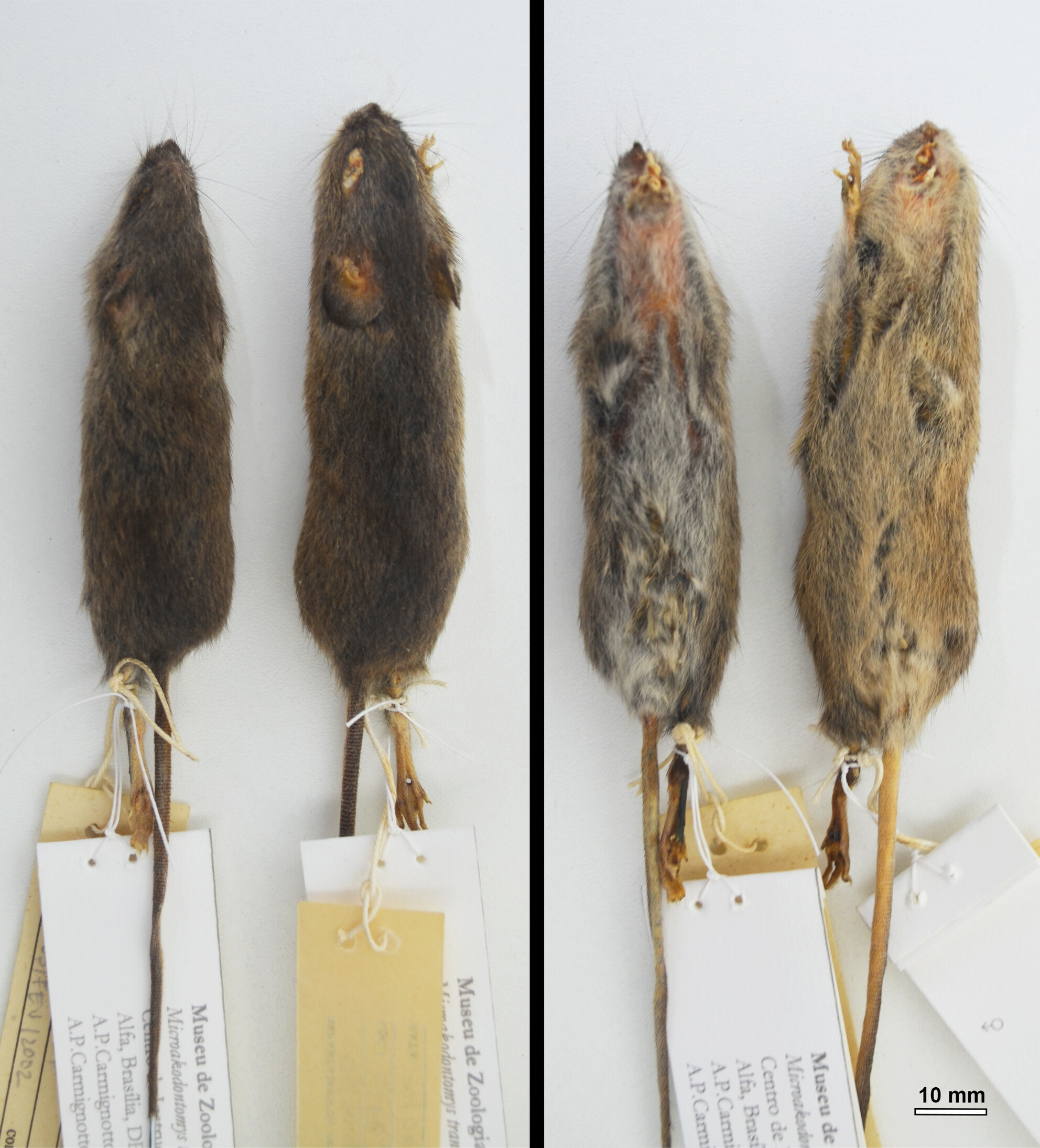

Conservation status
- Endangered (IUCN 3.1)

Scientific classification
- Kingdom: Animalia
- Phylum: Chordata
- Class: Mammalia
- Order: Rodentia
- Family: Cricetidae
- Subfamily: Sigmodontinae
- Tribe: Oryzomyini
- Genus: Microakodontomys; Hershkovitz, 1993
- Species: M. transitorius

Binomial name
- Microakodontomys transitorius Hershkovitz, 1993

= Transitional colilargo =

Species of rodent

The transitional colilargo (Microakodontomys transitorius) also known as the intermediate lesser grass mouse, is a species of rodent in the tribe Oryzomyini known only from two individuals found in the Federal District in Brazil. Although described as a link between oryzomyine and akodontine rodents and placed in its own genus, Microakodontomys, Weksler and coworkers dismissed it as an aberrant Oligoryzomys.
