= Reig's montane mouse =

Reig's Montane Mouse

Conservation status
- Vulnerable (IUCN 3.1)

Scientific classification
- Kingdom: Animalia
- Phylum: Chordata
- Class: Mammalia
- Order: Rodentia
- Family: Cricetidae
- Subfamily: Sigmodontinae
- Genus: Aepeomys
- Species: A. reigi

Binomial name
- Aepeomys reigi Ochoa, Aguilera, Pacheco & Soriano, 2001

Species of rodent

Reig's montane mouse (Aepeomys reigi) is a species of rodent in the family Cricetidae. It is found only in Venezuela. It is named after Argentine biologist Osvaldo Reig (1929–1992).
