= Hairy-eared cerrado mouse =

Conservation status
- Least Concern (IUCN 3.1)

Scientific classification
- Kingdom: Animalia
- Phylum: Chordata
- Class: Mammalia
- Order: Rodentia
- Family: Cricetidae
- Subfamily: Sigmodontinae
- Genus: Thalpomys
- Species: T. lasiotis

Binomial name
- Thalpomys lasiotis Thomas, 1916

Species of rodent

The hairy-eared cerrado mouse (Thalpomys lasiotis) or hairy-eared akodont, is a rodent species from South America. It is found in the cerrado grassland of Brazil.

== Description ==
The hairy-eared cerrado mouse has a head-and-body length of less than 90 mm (3.5 in) and is generally smaller than the only other species in the genus, the cerrado mouse (Thalpomys cerradensis). The two are similar in appearance, but the hairy-eared mouse has a more intense colour and longer, more lax fur. The dorsal pelage is reddish-brown, the individual hairs having blackish bases, orange central sections and blackish tips. There are also longer black guard hairs. The flanks and underparts are paler. The chin is buff and the eye-ring and cheeks orangish. The tail is brown above and pale beneath. The diploid number is 38.

== Distribution and habitat ==
This mouse is restricted to the cerrado ecoregion in Brazil, occurring in the states of Bahia, Minas Gerais, Rondônia and São Paulo, and the Federal District. It inhabits various types of open grassland, with or without scrub, bushes and scattered trees, and wetter grassland areas.

== Ecology ==
The hairy-eared cerrado mouse breeds in the dry season in some areas and in the wet season in others. Litter sizes of two and three have been recorded. The home range averages 2,278 m^{2} (24,500 sq ft) and it is the second most abundant rodent in the cerrado after the hairy-tailed bolo mouse (Necromys lasiurus).

== Status ==
This mouse has a wide range and is a common species. The cerrado grassland in which it lives is increasingly being threatened by the expansion of industrial-scale farming, the burning of vegetation for charcoal and the development of dams to provide irrigation. Although populations of the mouse may be in slight decline, the International Union for Conservation of Nature has assessed its conservation status as being of least concern because it believes the rate of population decline is not fast enough to justify placing it in a more threatened category.
