= Pagaibamba Protection Forest =

Protected area in Peru

- Bosque de Protección Pagaibamba
- IUCN category VI (protected area with sustainable use of natural resources)
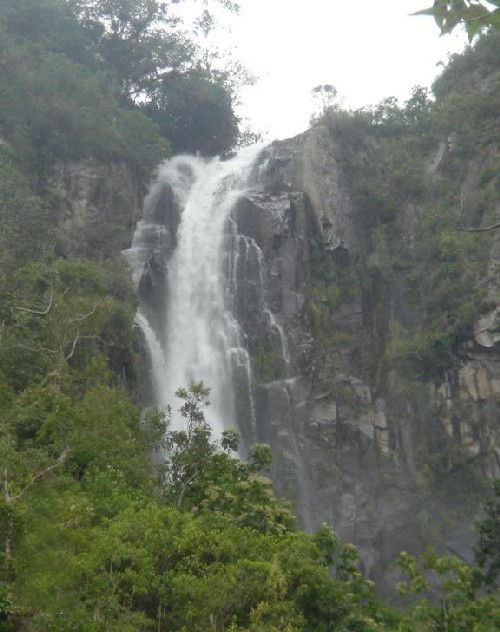
- Waterfall inside Pagaibamba Protection Forest

- Location within Peru
- Location: Peru; Cajamarca
- Coordinates: 6°24′53″S 79°04′03″W
- Area: 8.0247 sq mi (20.784 km^{2})
- Established: June 19, 1987
- Governing body: SERNANP
- Website: Bosque de Protección Pagaibamba

Pagaibamba Protection Forest is a protected natural area in the region of Cajamarca, Peru. The area was declared a protection forest in order to preserve the water supply of surrounding towns, preserve the water cycle of the area, protect road infrastructure and protection of soils by preventing erosion.

== History ==
The Pagaibamba Protection Forest was established on June 19, 1987.

== Geography ==
This protection forest is located in the district of Querocoto, Chota Province, Cajamarca. It covers an extension of 2,078.38 hectares (8.0247 mi^{2}) and protects a mountainous area dissected by small creeks. Elevations in the area are between 2300 and 2800 m.

== Climate ==
Mean annual temperatures have a maximum of 10,9 °C and a minimum of 6,5 °C. The annual average precipitation has a maximum of 1,722 mm and a minimum of 834 mm.

== Ecology ==
=== Flora ===
According to the Holdridge life zones classification, the vegetation type is a wet tropical mountain forest. Among the plant species reported in the area are: saucecillo (Podocarpus sp.), roble amarillo (Ocotea sp.), lanche (Myrcianthes sp.), suro (Chusquea sp.), queñual (Polylepis sp.), aliso (Alnus acuminata), palm trees, tree ferns, etc.; growing in association with tall grasses.

=== Fauna ===
Mammals reported in the forest include: the spectacled bear, the puma, the white-tailed deer, the Andean fox, the montane guinea pig, the mountain tapir, the tapeti, the pacarana, etc. The rodent Thomasomys pagaibambensis is only known from the forest.

Among the birds present in the area are: the razor-billed curassow, the Andean guan, the Andean condor, etc.

The frog Pristimantis chimu is reported in this area.

== Activities ==
Nature watching, trekking and scientific research are the main activities in the area.

== Environmental issues ==
Deforestation is threatening the forest's area of extension. In late 2016, Pagaibamba was one of several protected areas in northern Peru affected by human-caused forest fires. These fires were caused by slash-and-burn agricultural practices that went out of control coupled with drought. The burning of forests to open land for crops is considered illegal in Peru.
