= Ashaninka Oldfield mouse =

Conservation status
- Least Concern (IUCN 3.1)

Scientific classification
- Kingdom: Animalia
- Phylum: Chordata
- Class: Mammalia
- Order: Rodentia
- Family: Cricetidae
- Subfamily: Sigmodontinae
- Genus: Thomasomys
- Species: T. onkiro

Binomial name
- Thomasomys onkiro Luna & Pacheco, 2002

Species of rodent

The Ashaninka Oldfield mouse (Thomasomys onkiro) is a species of rodent in the family Cricetidae. It is known only from a single locality (which includes Otishi National Park) in the Cordillera Oriental of the southern Peruvian Andes, in montane forest at an elevation of 3350 m. It has terrestrial habits. The common name refers to the Asháninka, the largest indigenous group of the Peruvian Amazon.
