= Anderson's Oldfield mouse =

Conservation status
- Data Deficient (IUCN 3.1)

Scientific classification
- Kingdom: Animalia
- Phylum: Chordata
- Class: Mammalia
- Order: Rodentia
- Family: Cricetidae
- Subfamily: Sigmodontinae
- Genus: Thomasomys
- Species: T. andersoni

Binomial name
- Thomasomys andersoni Salazar-Bravo & Yates, 2007

Species of rodent

Anderson's Oldfield mouse (Thomasomys andersoni) is a species of rodent in the family Cricetidae.
