= Rosalinda's Oldfield mouse =

Conservation status
- Endangered (IUCN 3.1)

Scientific classification
- Kingdom: Animalia
- Phylum: Chordata
- Class: Mammalia
- Order: Rodentia
- Family: Cricetidae
- Subfamily: Sigmodontinae
- Genus: Thomasomys
- Species: T. rosalinda

Binomial name
- Thomasomys rosalinda Thomas & St. Leger, 1926

Species of rodent

Rosalinda's Oldfield mouse (Thomasomys rosalinda) is a species of rodent in the family Cricetidae. It is found only in Peru.
