= Ladew's Oldfield mouse =

Conservation status
- Least Concern (IUCN 3.1)

Scientific classification
- Kingdom: Animalia
- Phylum: Chordata
- Class: Mammalia
- Order: Rodentia
- Family: Cricetidae
- Subfamily: Sigmodontinae
- Genus: Thomasomys
- Species: T. ladewi

Binomial name
- Thomasomys ladewi Anthony, 1926

Species of rodent

Ladew's Oldfield mouse (Thomasomys ladewi) is a species of rodent in the family Cricetidae. It is found only in Bolivia.
