= Neomicroxus =

Neomicroxus Temporal range: Pleistocene - Recent

Scientific classification
- Kingdom: Animalia
- Phylum: Chordata
- Class: Mammalia
- Order: Rodentia
- Family: Cricetidae
- Subfamily: Sigmodontinae
- Tribe: Akodontini
- Genus: Neomicroxus; Alvarado-Serrano and D'Elía, 2013

Species
- Neomicroxus bogotensis Neomicroxus latebricola

Genus of rodents

Neomicroxus is a genus of grass mice. Both species were placed in the genus Akodon. There are two living species:

- N. bogotensis Bogotá grass mouse
- N. latebricola Ecuadorian grass mouse.
