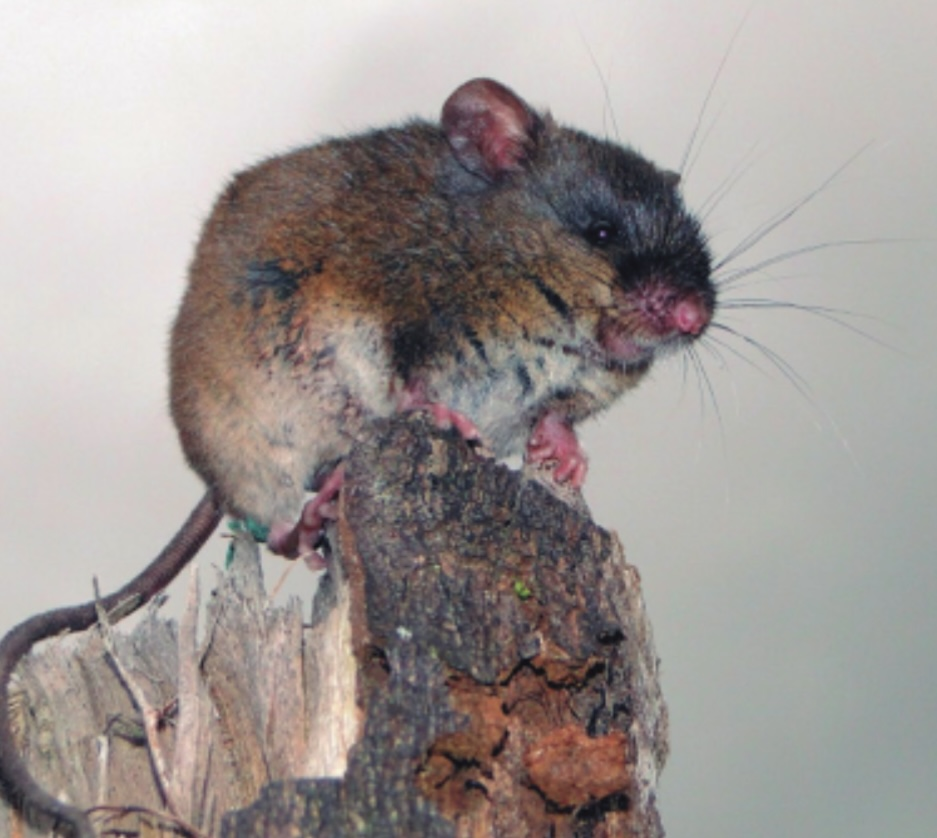

Conservation status
- Least Concern (IUCN 3.1)

Scientific classification
- Kingdom: Animalia
- Phylum: Chordata
- Class: Mammalia
- Order: Rodentia
- Family: Cricetidae
- Subfamily: Sigmodontinae
- Genus: Thomasomys
- Species: T. cinnameus

Binomial name
- Thomasomys cinnameus Anthony, 1924

= Cinnamon-colored Oldfield mouse =

Species of rodent

The cinnamon-colored Oldfield mouse (Thomasomys cinnameus), also called the "cinnamon-colored Thomasomys", is a species of rodent in the family Cricetidae. It is present in the Cordillera Oriental of the Andes from north central Ecuador to southern Colombia, at elevations from 2,400 to 3,800 m (7,900 to 12,500 ft). It has terrestrial habits, and has been found in cloud forest and mossy areas. It was formerly considered a subspecies of T. gracilis.
