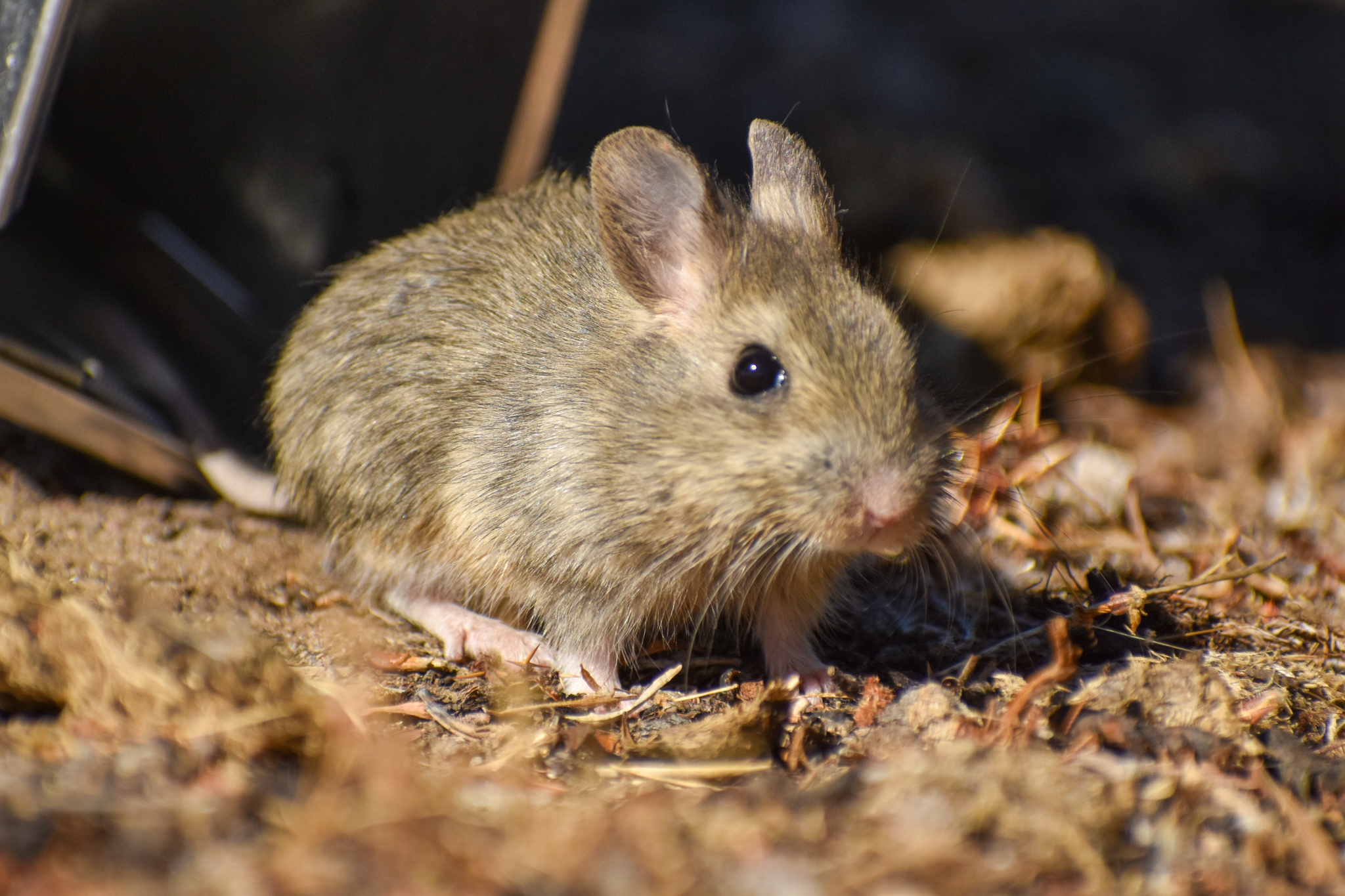

Conservation status
- Data Deficient (IUCN 3.1)

Scientific classification
- Kingdom: Animalia
- Phylum: Chordata
- Class: Mammalia
- Order: Rodentia
- Family: Cricetidae
- Subfamily: Sigmodontinae
- Genus: Euneomys
- Species: E. chinchilloides

Binomial name
- Euneomys chinchilloides (Waterhouse, 1839)

= Patagonian chinchilla mouse =

Species of rodent

The Patagonian chinchilla mouse (Euneomys chinchilloides) is a species of rodent in the family Cricetidae. It was first described by George Robert Waterhouse in 1839. It is found in Tierra del Fuego and neighboring areas of southernmost Argentina and Chile.

== Taxonomy ==
Euneomys chinchilloides is the current name for the Patagonian chinchilla mouse.

== Distribution and habitat ==
Euneomys chinchilloides can be found in the Tierra del Fuego, and are generally widespread in mainland Patagonia. They are also fairly abundant in the Sierras de Tecka, a region situated in the Andes mountains. Their habitat consists of scree that is windswept and bare.

== Life history ==
=== Morphology ===
The genus Euneomys are described as having medium to large body size. They have short tails and dense fur. Their molars are hypsodont.

Measurements of the body length, including the head, of Euneomys chinchilloides ranges from 103 to 143 mm. Tail length ranges from 62 to 90 mm. Hindfoot length ranges from 25 to 30 mm. The length of the ear ranges from 18.5 to 22.2 mm.

=== Ecology ===
The genus Euneomys are herbivorous and nocturnal.

=== Genetics ===
Euneomys chinchilloides have 34 chromosomes, although some specimens exhibited an extra pair of chromosomes.
