= Peterson's chinchilla mouse =

Conservation status
- Least Concern (IUCN 3.1)

Scientific classification
- Kingdom: Animalia
- Phylum: Chordata
- Class: Mammalia
- Order: Rodentia
- Family: Cricetidae
- Subfamily: Sigmodontinae
- Genus: Euneomys
- Species: E. petersoni

Binomial name
- Euneomys petersoni J. A. Allen, 1903

Species of rodent

Peterson's chinchilla mouse (Euneomys petersoni) is a species of rodent in the family Cricetidae and is found in west central and southern Argentina and nearby areas of Chile. The species is named after American paleontologist Olaf A. Peterson (1865–1933).
