= Biting chinchilla mouse =

Conservation status
- Least Concern (IUCN 3.1)

Scientific classification
- Kingdom: Animalia
- Phylum: Chordata
- Class: Mammalia
- Order: Rodentia
- Family: Cricetidae
- Subfamily: Sigmodontinae
- Genus: Euneomys
- Species: E. mordax

Binomial name
- Euneomys mordax Thomas, 1912

Species of rodent

The biting chinchilla mouse (Euneomys mordax) is a species of rodent in the family Cricetidae. It is found in west central Argentina and nearby areas of Chile, where it inhabits highland meadows, probably at elevations of 1740 to 3000 m.
