= Tanyuromys =

Scientific classification
- Domain: Eukaryota
- Kingdom: Animalia
- Phylum: Chordata
- Class: Mammalia
- Order: Rodentia
- Family: Cricetidae
- Subfamily: Sigmodontinae
- Tribe: Oryzomyini
- Genus: Tanyuromys; Pine, Timm, & Weksler, 2012

Species
- Tanyuromys aphrastus; Tanyuromys thomasleei

Genus of rodents

Tanyuromys is a genus of oryzomyine rodents distributed in mountainous areas from Central America to the western part of South America. The species in this genus have historically been placed in Sigmodontomys, but according to cladistic research, this genus is either sister to the clade containing Sigmodontomys and Melanomys or sister to the extinct Caribbean giant rice rat Megalomys. Along with members of Aegialomys and Melanomys, it occurs at some of the highest elevations known for oryzomines.

Two species are known from the genus: T. aphrastus (distributed from Costa Rica to Ecuador) and the recently described T. thomasleei (endemic to Ecuador).
