= Wandering Oldfield mouse =

Conservation status
- Least Concern (IUCN 3.1)

Scientific classification
- Kingdom: Animalia
- Phylum: Chordata
- Class: Mammalia
- Order: Rodentia
- Family: Cricetidae
- Subfamily: Sigmodontinae
- Genus: Thomasomys
- Species: T. erro

Binomial name
- Thomasomys erro Anthony, 1926

Species of rodent

The wandering Oldfield mouse (Thomasomys erro), also called the wandering thomasomys, is a species of rodent in the family Cricetidae. It has been found in both the Cordillera Oriental and Cordillera Occidental of the Andes in central and north central Ecuador, at elevations from 2400 to 3600 m. It has terrestrial habits, and has been found in cloud forest and areas of secondary vegetation. It was formerly considered a subspecies of T. cinereiventer.
