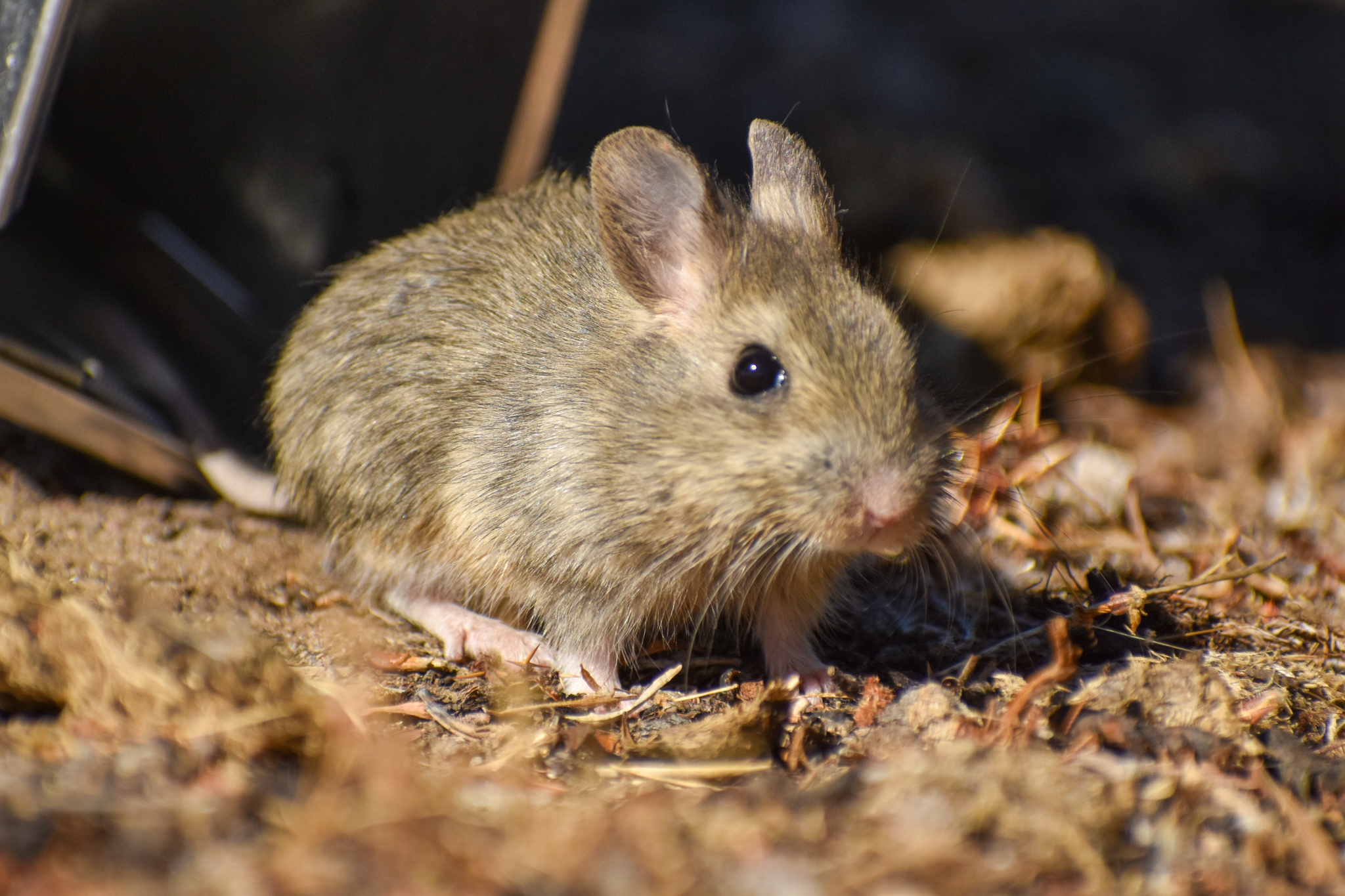
- Euneomys chinchilloides

Scientific classification
- Kingdom: Animalia
- Phylum: Chordata
- Class: Mammalia
- Infraclass: Placentalia
- Order: Rodentia
- Family: Cricetidae
- Subfamily: Sigmodontinae
- Tribe: Phyllotini
- Genus: Euneomys; Coues, 1874

Type species
- Reithrodon chinchilloides

Species
- Euneomys chinchilloides Euneomys fossor Euneomys mordax Euneomys petersoni

= Euneomys =

Genus of rodents

Euneomys is a genus of rodents in the family Cricetidae. It contains the following species:

- Patagonian chinchilla mouse (Euneomys chinchilloides)
- Burrowing chinchilla mouse (Euneomys fossor)
- Biting chinchilla mouse (Euneomys mordax)
- Peterson's chinchilla mouse (Euneomys petersoni)
