= Hooijer's rat =

Scientific classification
- Domain: Eukaryota
- Kingdom: Animalia
- Phylum: Chordata
- Class: Mammalia
- Order: Rodentia
- Family: Cricetidae
- Subfamily: Sigmodontinae
- Genus: †Cordimus
- Species: †C. hooijeri

Binomial name
- †Cordimus hooijeri Zijlstra, McFarlane, Van Den Hoek Ostende, & Lundberg, 2014

Subfossil species of rat

Hooijer's rat (Cordimus hooijeri) is a subfossil species of rat. This species likely went extinct in the last 500 years, and lived in Bonaire.
