= Rhoads's Oldfield mouse =

Conservation status
- Least Concern (IUCN 2.3)

Scientific classification
- Kingdom: Animalia
- Phylum: Chordata
- Class: Mammalia
- Order: Rodentia
- Family: Cricetidae
- Subfamily: Sigmodontinae
- Genus: Thomasomys
- Species: T. rhoadsi

Binomial name
- Thomasomys rhoadsi Stone, 1914

Species of rodent

Rhoads's Oldfield mouse (Thomasomys rhoadsi) is a species of rodent in the family Cricetidae. It is found only in Ecuador.
