= Burrowing chinchilla mouse =

Conservation status
- Data Deficient (IUCN 3.1)

Scientific classification
- Kingdom: Animalia
- Phylum: Chordata
- Class: Mammalia
- Order: Rodentia
- Family: Cricetidae
- Subfamily: Sigmodontinae
- Genus: Euneomys
- Species: E. fossor

Binomial name
- Euneomys fossor Thomas, 1899

Species of rodent

The burrowing chinchilla mouse (Euneomys fossor) is a species of rodent in the family Cricetidae. It is found in Salta Province, Argentina.
