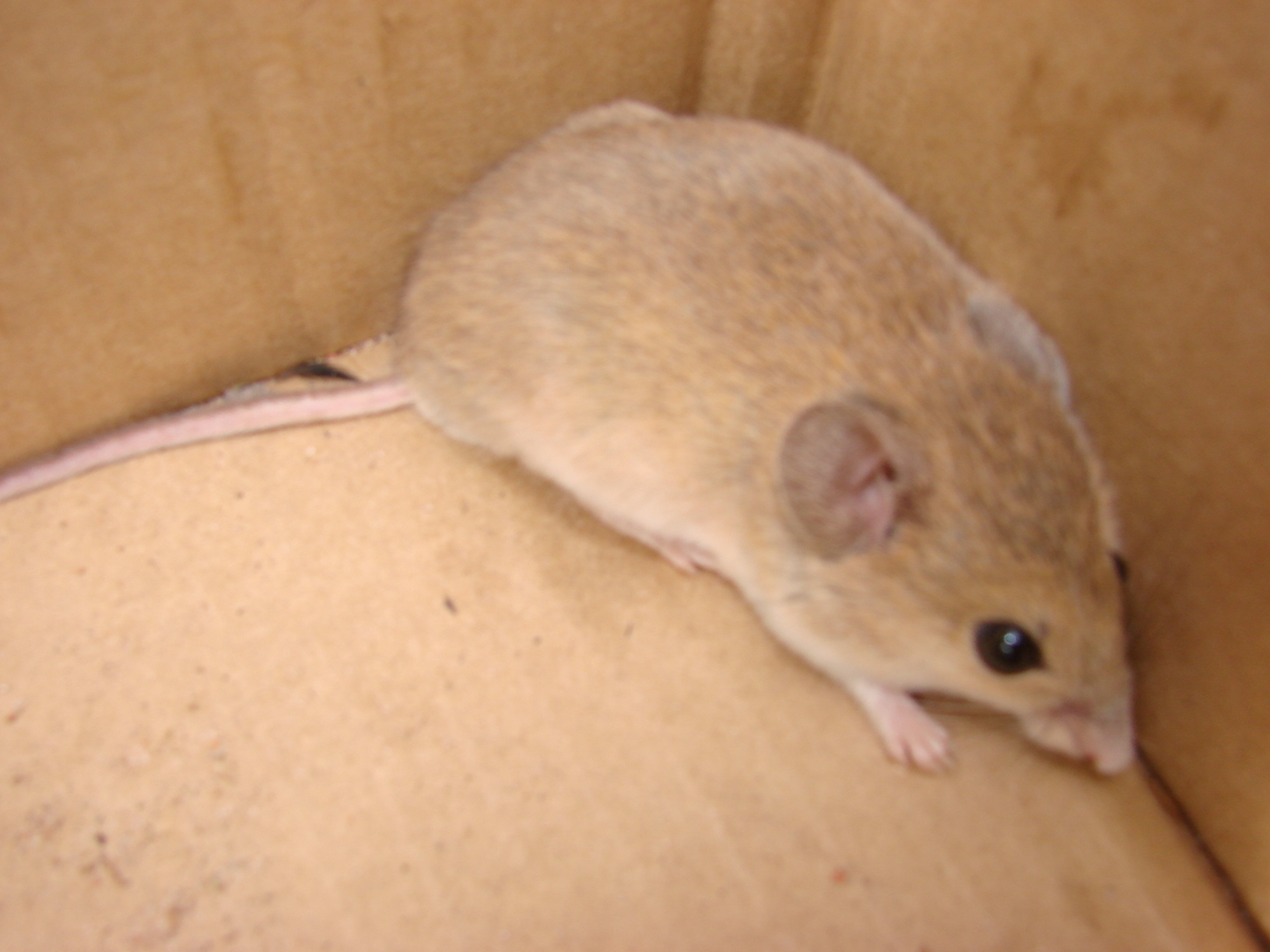

Conservation status
- Least Concern (IUCN 3.1)

Scientific classification
- Kingdom: Animalia
- Phylum: Chordata
- Class: Mammalia
- Order: Rodentia
- Family: Cricetidae
- Subfamily: Sigmodontinae
- Genus: Thalpomys
- Species: T. cerradensis

Binomial name
- Thalpomys cerradensis Hershkovitz, 1990

= Cerrado mouse =

Rodent native to Brazil

The cerrado mouse (Thalpomys cerradensis) is a species of rodent from South America. It is found in the cerrado of Brazil.

== Description ==
The cerrado mouse has a head-and-body length of more than 90 mm (3.5 in) and is larger than the only other species in the genus, the hairy-eared cerrado mouse (Thalpomys lasiotis). The fur is dense and rather stiff. The general colouring resembles some members of the Oligoryzomys genus. The dorsal pelage is reddish-brown, the individual hairs having blackish bases, orange central sections and blackish tips. There are also longer black guard hairs. The flanks and underparts are paler. The chin is buff and the eye-ring and cheeks orangish. The upper surfaces of the hindfeet are buff; they are small, with short outer toes and tiny claws. The tail, which is well-haired, is brown above and buff below. The diploid number is 36.

== Distribution and habitat ==
This mouse is restricted to the cerrado ecoregion in Brazil, occurring in the states of Bahia, Goiás and Mato Grosso. It inhabits open grassland, savannah with occasional trees and wetter grassland areas with palms. It readily recolonises areas affected by wildfires, and is at its most numerous less than two years later.

== Ecology ==
The cerrado mouse is most active soon after dusk and in the hours before dawn. In the state of Bahia, it is hardly ever caught in the live traps used by researchers for surveying small mammals, but its presence in the area is confirmed by its abundance in barn owl pellets (the undigested parts of their prey that the owls regurgitate).

== Status ==
This mouse has a wide range but a rather patchy distribution. The cerrado grassland in which it lives is increasingly being threatened by the expansion of industrial-scale farming, the burning of vegetation for charcoal and the development of dams to provide irrigation. Although the population of the mouse may be in general decline, the International Union for Conservation of Nature has assessed its conservation status as being of least concern because it believes the rate of population decline is not fast enough to justify placing it in a more threatened category.
