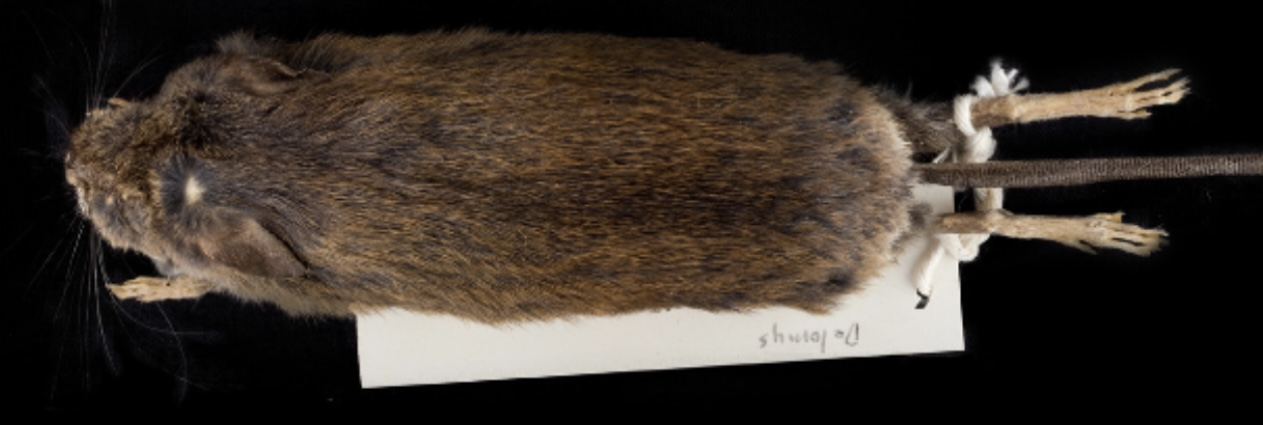

Conservation status
- Least Concern (IUCN 3.1)

Scientific classification
- Kingdom: Animalia
- Phylum: Chordata
- Class: Mammalia
- Order: Rodentia
- Family: Cricetidae
- Subfamily: Sigmodontinae
- Genus: Delomys
- Species: D. dorsalis

Binomial name
- Delomys dorsalis (Hensel, 1873)

= Striped Atlantic Forest rat =

Species of rodent

The striped Atlantic Forest rat (Delomys dorsalis) is a rodent species from South America. It is found in Argentina and Brazil.
