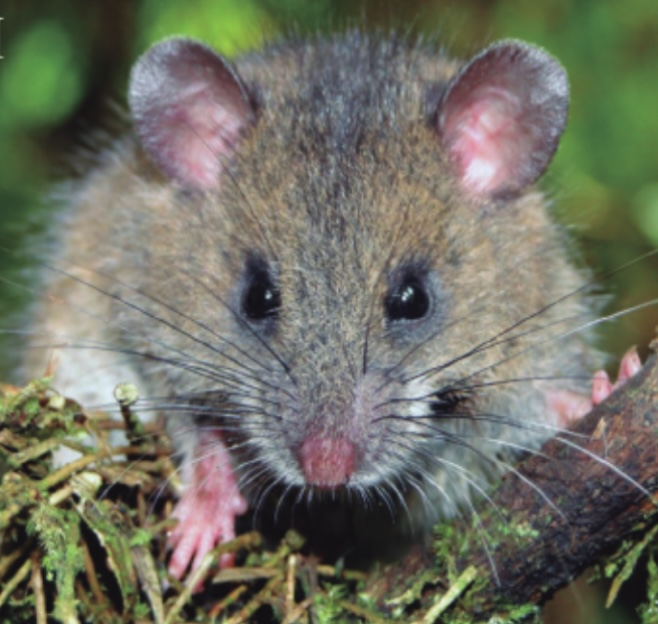

Conservation status
- Least Concern (IUCN 3.1)

Scientific classification
- Kingdom: Animalia
- Phylum: Chordata
- Class: Mammalia
- Order: Rodentia
- Family: Cricetidae
- Subfamily: Sigmodontinae
- Genus: Thomasomys
- Species: T. baeops

Binomial name
- Thomasomys baeops (Thomas, 1899)

= Beady-eyed mouse =

Species of rodent

The beady-eyed mouse (Thomasomys baeops) is a species of rodent in the family Cricetidae. It is found only in Ecuador.
