= Tanyuromys aphrastus =

Conservation status
- Data Deficient (IUCN 3.1)

Scientific classification
- Kingdom: Animalia
- Phylum: Chordata
- Class: Mammalia
- Order: Rodentia
- Family: Cricetidae
- Subfamily: Sigmodontinae
- Genus: Tanyuromys
- Species: T. aphrastus

Binomial name
- Tanyuromys aphrastus Harris, 1932

Synonyms
- Sigmodontomys aphrastus

Species of rodent

Tanyuromys aphrastus, known as the long-tailed sigmodontomys, Harris's rice water rat, or the long-tailed rice rat, is a species of rodent in the family Cricetidae. It is known from Costa Rica, Panama, and Ecuador. In 2012, it was reassigned to its current genus from Sigmodontomys.
