= Aepeomys =

Scientific classification
- Kingdom: Animalia
- Phylum: Chordata
- Class: Mammalia
- Infraclass: Placentalia
- Order: Rodentia
- Family: Cricetidae
- Subfamily: Sigmodontinae
- Tribe: Thomasomyini
- Genus: Aepeomys; Thomas, 1898

Type species
- Oryzomys lugens Thomas, 1896

Species
- Aepeomys lugens Aepeomys reigi

Genus of rodents

Aepeomys is a small genus of rodents in the family Cricetidae. The species in this genus are found in Ecuador (A. lugens) and Venezuela (both species).

It contains the following two species:

- Olive montane mouse (Aepeomys lugens)
- Reig's montane mouse (Aepeomys reigi)
