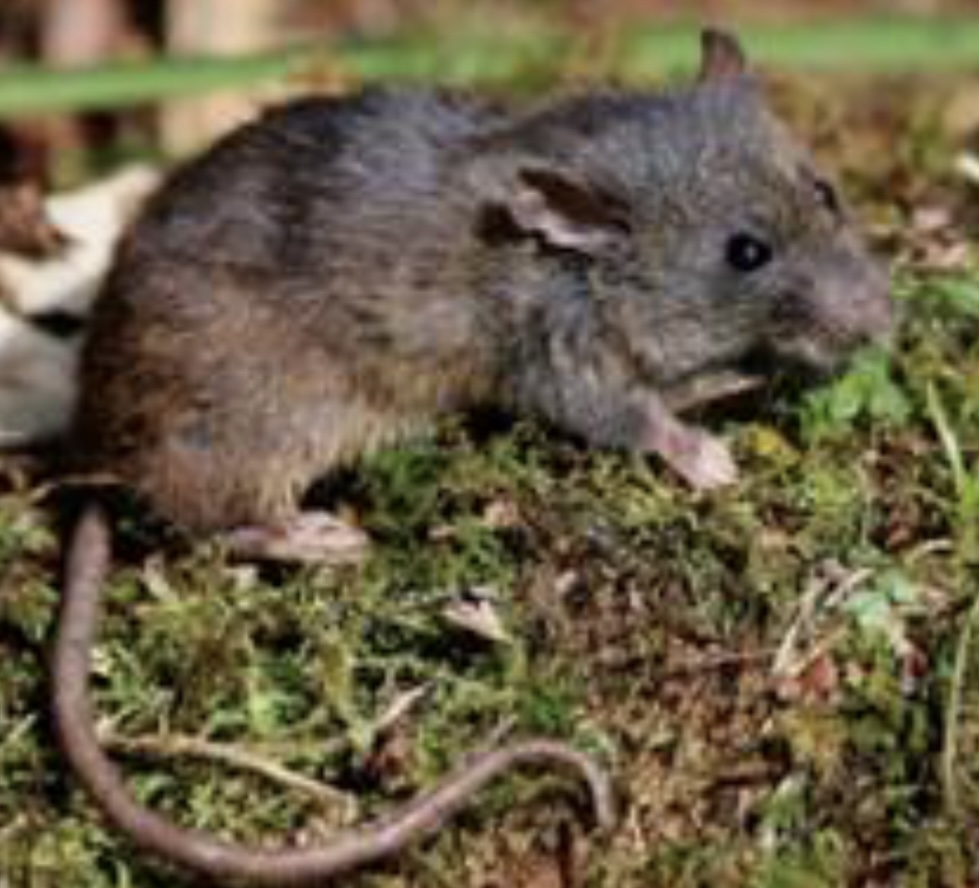

Conservation status
- Least Concern (IUCN 3.1)

Scientific classification
- Kingdom: Animalia
- Phylum: Chordata
- Class: Mammalia
- Infraclass: Placentalia
- Order: Rodentia
- Family: Cricetidae
- Subfamily: Sigmodontinae
- Genus: Thomasomys
- Species: T. taczanowskii

Binomial name
- Thomasomys taczanowskii (Thomas, 1882)

= Taczanowski's Oldfield mouse =

Species of rodent

Taczanowski's Oldfield mouse (Thomasomys taczanowskii) is a species of rodent in the family Cricetidae. It is found only in Peru.
