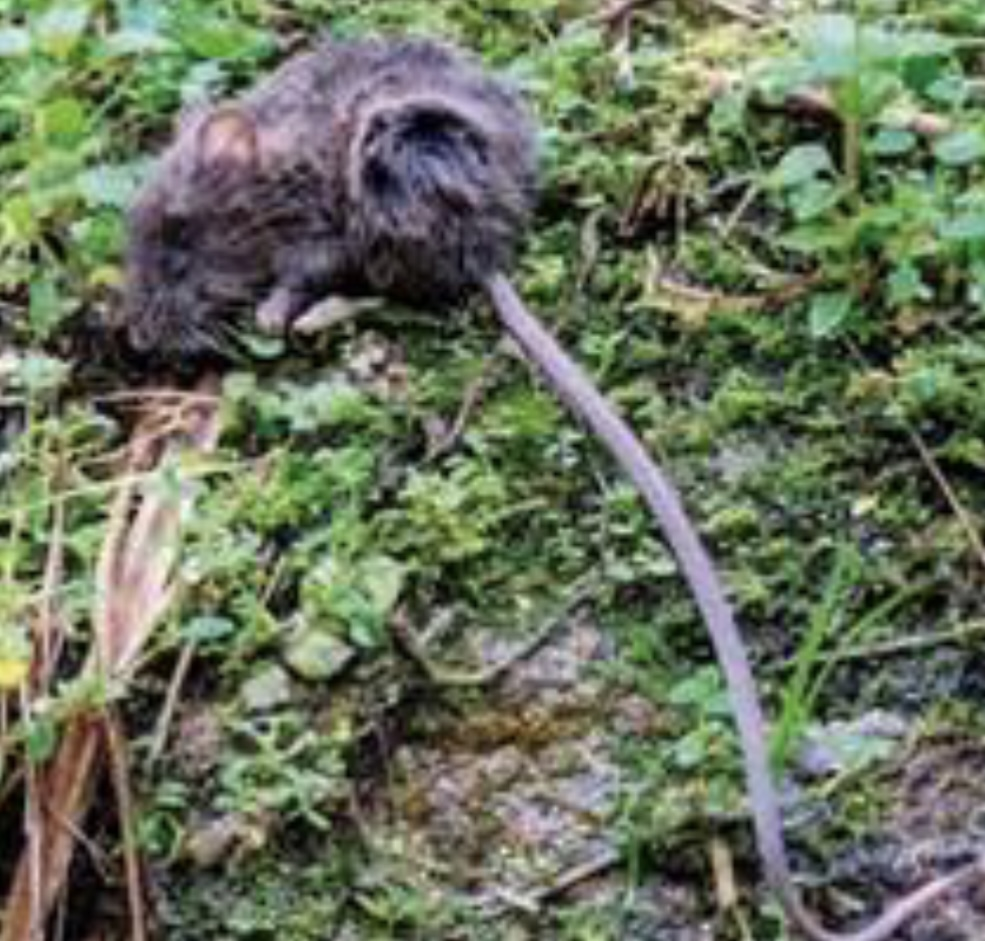

Conservation status
- Least Concern (IUCN 3.1)

Scientific classification
- Kingdom: Animalia
- Phylum: Chordata
- Class: Mammalia
- Order: Rodentia
- Family: Cricetidae
- Subfamily: Sigmodontinae
- Genus: Thomasomys
- Species: T. caudivarius

Binomial name
- Thomasomys caudivarius Anthony, 1923

= White-tipped Oldfield mouse =

Species of rodent

The white-tipped Oldfield mouse (Thomasomys caudivarius) is a species of rodent in the family Cricetidae. It is found in the Andes from central Ecuador to northern Peru, at elevations from 2500 to 3350 m, where it lives in montane forest.
