= Apeco Oldfield mouse =

Conservation status
- Least Concern (IUCN 3.1)

Scientific classification
- Kingdom: Animalia
- Phylum: Chordata
- Class: Mammalia
- Order: Rodentia
- Family: Cricetidae
- Subfamily: Sigmodontinae
- Genus: Thomasomys
- Species: T. apeco

Binomial name
- Thomasomys apeco Leo & Gardner, 1993

Species of rodent

The Apeco Oldfield mouse (Thomasomys apeco) is a species of rodent in the family Cricetidae. It is known only from a single locality in north central Peru, which includes Rio Abiseo National Park, where it was found in cloud forest at an elevation of 3300 m. The species name comes from the acronym for the Asociacion Peruana para la Conservacion de la Naturaleza. It is among the largest members of the genus.
