= Daphne's Oldfield mouse =

Conservation status
- Least Concern (IUCN 3.1)

Scientific classification
- Kingdom: Animalia
- Phylum: Chordata
- Class: Mammalia
- Order: Rodentia
- Family: Cricetidae
- Subfamily: Sigmodontinae
- Genus: Thomasomys
- Species: T. daphne

Binomial name
- Thomasomys daphne Thomas, 1917

Species of rodent

Daphne's Oldfield mouse (Thomasomys daphne) is a species of rodent in the family Cricetidae. It is found in Bolivia and Peru.
