= Olive montane mouse =

Conservation status
- Least Concern (IUCN 3.1)

Scientific classification
- Kingdom: Animalia
- Phylum: Chordata
- Class: Mammalia
- Order: Rodentia
- Family: Cricetidae
- Subfamily: Sigmodontinae
- Genus: Aepeomys
- Species: A. lugens

Binomial name
- Aepeomys lugens (Thomas, 1896)

Species of rodent

The olive montane mouse (Aepeomys lugens) is a species of rodent in the family Cricetidae. It is found in Ecuador and Venezuela.
