= Olrog's chaco mouse =

Conservation status
- Least Concern (IUCN 3.1)

Scientific classification
- Kingdom: Animalia
- Phylum: Chordata
- Class: Mammalia
- Order: Rodentia
- Family: Cricetidae
- Subfamily: Sigmodontinae
- Genus: Andalgalomys
- Species: A. olrogi

Binomial name
- Andalgalomys olrogi Williams & Mares, 1978

Species of rodent

Olrog's chaco mouse (Andalgalomys olrogi) is a species of South American rodent in the family Cricetidae, endemic to Argentina. The natural habitat of the species is hot deserts. Its karyotype has 2n = 60. The species is named after Swedish-Argentine biologist Claes C. Olrog.
