= Ashy-bellied Oldfield mouse =

Conservation status
- Least Concern (IUCN 3.1)

Scientific classification
- Kingdom: Animalia
- Phylum: Chordata
- Class: Mammalia
- Order: Rodentia
- Family: Cricetidae
- Subfamily: Sigmodontinae
- Genus: Thomasomys
- Species: T. cinereiventer

Binomial name
- Thomasomys cinereiventer J.A. Allen, 1912

Species of rodent

The ashy-bellied Oldfield mouse (Thomasomys cinereiventer) is a species of rodent in the family Cricetidae. It is found in Colombia and Ecuador.
