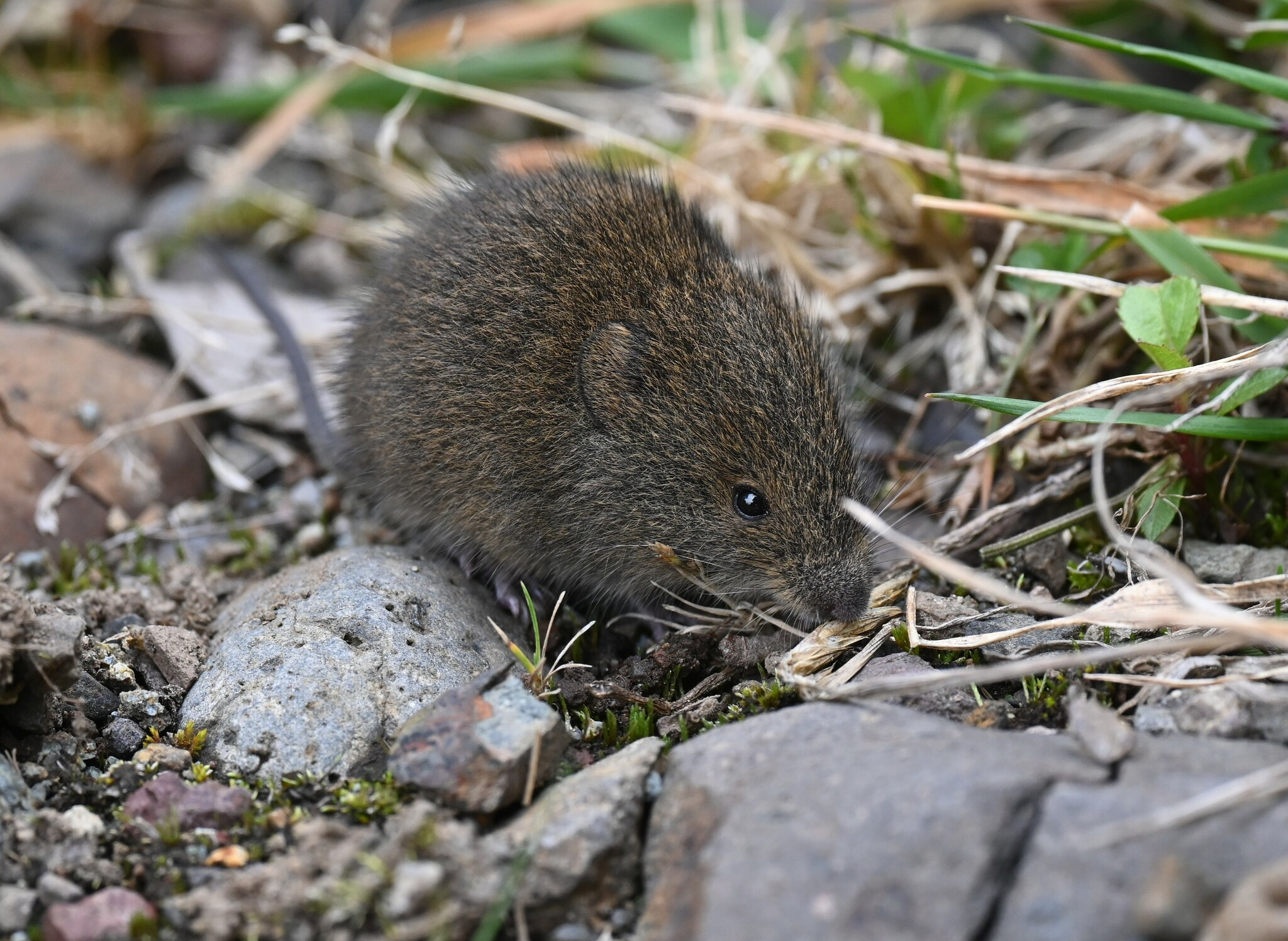

Conservation status
- Least Concern (IUCN 3.1)

Scientific classification
- Kingdom: Animalia
- Phylum: Chordata
- Class: Mammalia
- Order: Rodentia
- Family: Cricetidae
- Subfamily: Sigmodontinae
- Genus: Akodon
- Species: A. mollis

Binomial name
- Akodon mollis Thomas, 1894

= Soft grass mouse =

Species of rodent

The soft grass mouse is a species of rodent in the family Cricetidae. It is found in Ecuador and Peru.
