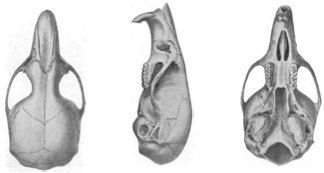
- Thomasomys monochromos skull.

Scientific classification
- Kingdom: Animalia
- Phylum: Chordata
- Class: Mammalia
- Order: Rodentia
- Family: Cricetidae
- Subfamily: Sigmodontinae
- Tribe: Thomasomyini
- Genus: Thomasomys; Coues, 1884

Type species
- Hesperomys cinereus Thomas, 1882

Species
- Thomasomys andersoni Thomasomys antoniobracki Thomasomys apeco Thomasomys aureus Thomasomys auricularis Thomasomys australis Thomasomys baeops Thomasomys bombycinus Thomasomys burneoi Thomasomys caudivarius Thomasomys cinereiventer Thomasomys cinereus Thomasomys cinnameus Thomasomys daphne Thomasomys eleusis Thomasomys erro Thomasomys gracilis Thomasomys hudsoni Thomasomys hylophilus Thomasomys incanus Thomasomys ischyrus Thomasomys kalinowskii Thomasomys lojapiuranus Thomasomys ladewi Thomasomys laniger Thomasomys macrotis Thomasomys monochromos Thomasomys niveipes Thomasomys notatus Thomasomys onkiro Thomasomys oreas Thomasomys pagaibambensis Thomasomys paramorum Thomasomys pardignasi Thomasomys popayanus Thomasomys praetor Thomasomys pyrrhonotus Thomasomys rhoadsi Thomasomys rosalinda Thomasomys shallqukucha Thomasomys silvestris Thomasomys taczanowskii Thomasomys ucucha Thomasomys vestitus Thomasomys vulcani

= Thomasomys =

Genus of rodents

Thomasomys is a genus of rodents in the family Cricetidae, named after British zoologist Oldfield Thomas. Nuclear DNA sequence analysis has indicated that it is a sister taxon to Rhagomys. It contains the following species:

- Anderson's Oldfield mouse (Thomasomys andersoni)
- Antonio Brack's Oldfield mouse (Thomasomys antoniobracki)
- Apeco Oldfield mouse (Thomasomys apeco)
- Golden Oldfield mouse (Thomasomys aureus)
- Thomasomys auricularis
- Thomasomys australis
- Beady-eyed mouse (Thomasomys baeops)
- Silky Oldfield mouse (Thomasomys bombycinus)
- Burneo's Oldfield mouse (Thomasomys burneoi)
- White-tipped Oldfield mouse (Thomasomys caudivarius)
- Ashy-bellied Oldfield mouse (Thomasomys cinereiventer)
- Ash-colored Oldfield mouse (Thomasomys cinereus)
- Cinnamon-colored Oldfield mouse (Thomasomys cinnameus)
- Daphne's Oldfield mouse (Thomasomys daphne)
- Peruvian Oldfield mouse (Thomasomys eleusis)
- Wandering Oldfield mouse (Thomasomys erro)
- Slender Oldfield mouse (Thomasomys gracilis)
- Hudson's Oldfield mouse (Thomasomys hudsoni)
- Woodland Oldfield mouse (Thomasomys hylophilus)
- Inca Oldfield mouse (Thomasomys incanus)
- Strong-tailed Oldfield mouse (Thomasomys ischyrus)
- Kalinowski's Oldfield mouse (Thomasomys kalinowskii)
- Ladew's Oldfield mouse (Thomasomys ladewi)
- Soft-furred Oldfield mouse (Thomasomys laniger)
- Thomasomys lojapiuranus
- Large-eared Oldfield mouse (Thomasomys macrotis)
- Unicolored Oldfield mouse (Thomasomys monochromos)
- Snow-footed Oldfield mouse (Thomasomys niveipes)
- Distinguished Oldfield mouse (Thomasomys notatus)
- Ashaninka Oldfield mouse (Thomasomys onkiro)
- Montane Oldfield mouse (Thomasomys oreas)
- Thomasomys pagaibambensis
- Paramo Oldfield mouse (Thomasomys paramorum)
- Pardiñas' Andean mouse (Thomasomys pardignasi)
- Popayán Oldfield mouse (Thomasomys popayanus)
- Cajamarca Oldfield mouse (Thomasomys praetor)
- Thomas's Oldfield mouse (Thomasomys pyrrhonotus)
- Rhoads's Oldfield mouse (Thomasomys rhoadsi)
- Rosalinda's Oldfield mouse (Thomasomys rosalinda)
- Thomasomys shallqukucha
- Forest Oldfield mouse (Thomasomys silvestris)
- Taczanowski's Oldfield mouse (Thomasomys taczanowskii)
- Ucucha Oldfield mouse (Thomasomys ucucha)
- Dressy Oldfield mouse (Thomasomys vestitus)
- Pichincha Oldfield mouse (Thomasomys vulcani)

== See also ==
- Peromyscus polionotus, a North American cricetid species also called an "oldfield mouse".
