= Thomas's Oldfield mouse =

Conservation status
- Data Deficient (IUCN 3.1)

Scientific classification
- Kingdom: Animalia
- Phylum: Chordata
- Class: Mammalia
- Order: Rodentia
- Family: Cricetidae
- Subfamily: Sigmodontinae
- Genus: Thomasomys
- Species: T. pyrrhonotus

Binomial name
- Thomasomys pyrrhonotus Thomas, 1886

Species of rodent

Thomas's Oldfield mouse (Thomasomys pyrrhonotus) is a species of rodent in the family Cricetidae.

It is found in Ecuador and Peru.
