= Woodland Oldfield mouse =

Conservation status
- Vulnerable (IUCN 3.1)

Scientific classification
- Kingdom: Animalia
- Phylum: Chordata
- Class: Mammalia
- Order: Rodentia
- Family: Cricetidae
- Subfamily: Sigmodontinae
- Genus: Thomasomys
- Species: T. hylophilus

Binomial name
- Thomasomys hylophilus Osgood, 1912

Species of rodent

The woodland Oldfield mouse (Thomasomys hylophilus) is a species of rodent in the family Cricetidae. It is found in Colombia and Venezuela.
