= Ecuadorian grass mouse =

Conservation status
- Endangered (IUCN 3.1)

Scientific classification
- Kingdom: Animalia
- Phylum: Chordata
- Class: Mammalia
- Order: Rodentia
- Family: Cricetidae
- Subfamily: Sigmodontinae
- Genus: Neomicroxus
- Species: N. latebricola

Binomial name
- Neomicroxus latebricola (Anthony, 1924)

Synonyms
- Microxus latebricola Akodon latebricola

Species of rodent

The Ecuadorian grass mouse (Neomicroxus latebricola) is a species of rodent in the family Cricetidae. It is found only in Ecuador.
