= Paramo Oldfield mouse =

Conservation status
- Least Concern (IUCN 3.1)

Scientific classification
- Kingdom: Animalia
- Phylum: Chordata
- Class: Mammalia
- Order: Rodentia
- Family: Cricetidae
- Subfamily: Sigmodontinae
- Genus: Thomasomys
- Species: T. paramorum

Binomial name
- Thomasomys paramorum Thomas, 1898

Species of rodent

The paramo Oldfield mouse (Thomasomys paramorum) is a species of rodent in the family Cricetidae. It is found only in Ecuador and Colombia.
