= Slender Oldfield mouse =

Conservation status
- Near Threatened (IUCN 3.1)

Scientific classification
- Kingdom: Animalia
- Phylum: Chordata
- Class: Mammalia
- Order: Rodentia
- Family: Cricetidae
- Subfamily: Sigmodontinae
- Genus: Thomasomys
- Species: T. gracilis

Binomial name
- Thomasomys gracilis Thomas, 1917

Species of rodent

The slender Oldfield mouse (Thomasomys gracilis) is a species of rodent in the family Cricetidae. It is found in Ecuador and Peru.
