= Golden Oldfield mouse =

Conservation status
- Least Concern (IUCN 3.1)

Scientific classification
- Kingdom: Animalia
- Phylum: Chordata
- Class: Mammalia
- Order: Rodentia
- Family: Cricetidae
- Subfamily: Sigmodontinae
- Genus: Thomasomys
- Species: T. aureus

Binomial name
- Thomasomys aureus (Tomes, 1860)

Species of rodent

The golden Oldfield mouse or golden thomasomys (Thomasomys aureus) is a species of rodent in the family Cricetidae. It is found in Colombia, Ecuador, Peru, and Venezuela. Both the common and genus name commemorate the British zoologist Oldfield Thomas who worked at the Natural History Museum, London and studied South American rodents.

== Description ==
The Golden Oldfield mouse is a large member of its genus Thomasomys with a head-and-body length of 160 to 180 mm (6 to 7 in). The dorsal fur is thick, coarse, and long, a golden-brown colour grizzled with grey, with a narrow dark line along the spine. The ventral fur consists of grey hairs with yellowish tips. The hind feet are up to 40 mm (1.6 in) long, the upper surfaces having dark patches extending to the bases of the digits, with orange or white margins. The tail is unicoloured and ringed, clad with short hair and lacking a "pencil" (tuft of hairs) at its tip. The tail is 125 to 140% of the head-and-body length.

== Distribution and habitat ==
The species occurs in forests in the foothills of the Andes. Its range extends from western Venezuela and eastern Colombia through most of Ecuador and Peru, and western central Bolivia. It typically inhabits densely vegetated areas at altitudes of between 1,500 and 4,000 m (5,000 and 13,000 ft).

== Ecology ==
This mouse is partly arboreal. It has been found on horizontal branches making paths between the mosses and liverworts, and also on the ground with well-worn routes among the grasses and clumps of moss. Nests have been found in trees a few metres above the ground. The diet includes vegetable matter, fruits, seeds and small invertebrates.

== Status ==
The golden Oldfield mouse has a wide range and is a fairly common species in most parts of its range, though less common in Ecuador. Deforestation is occurring throughout its range and populations may be declining, but the total population is likely to be large and any downward trend in populations is probably slow, so the International Union for Conservation of Nature has assessed its conservation status as being of "least concern".
