= List of living mammal species described in the 2020s =

The lists linked contain only newly recognized species and subspecies of living mammals whose formal description was first published during the period from 1 January 2020 to 31 December 2029. By default, the tables are sorted by the publ-date and alphabetically by the scientific name.

Newly described extinct mammal species are listed in the articles which cover events in the field of paleomammalogy for a specific year (e.g. 2020 in paleomammalogy).

== See also ==
- List of bird species described in the 2020s
- American Society of Mammalogists
