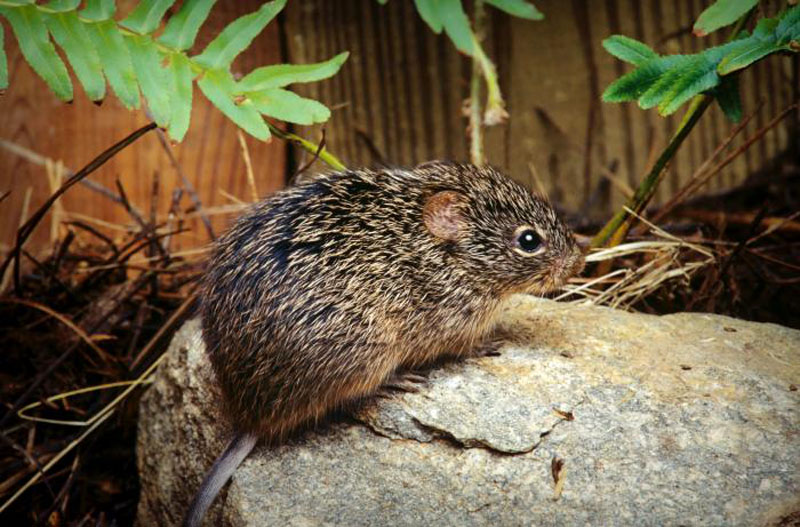
- Hispid cotton rat (Sigmodon hispidus)

Scientific classification
- Kingdom: Animalia
- Phylum: Chordata
- Class: Mammalia
- Order: Rodentia
- Family: Cricetidae
- Subfamily: Sigmodontinae; Wagner, 1843

Tribes
- See text

= Sigmodontinae =

Sigmodontinae Temporal range: Early Pliocene - recent

Subfamily of rodents

Sigmodontinae is a subfamily of rodents that includes New World rats and mice, with at least 376 species. Their distribution includes much of the New World, but the genera are predominantly South American, such as brucies. They invaded South America from Central America as part of the Great American Interchange near the end of the Miocene, about 5 million years ago. Sigmodontines proceeded to diversify explosively in the formerly isolated continent. They inhabit many of the same ecological niches that the Murinae occupy in the Old World.

The "Thomasomyini" from the Atlantic Forest of Brazil are generally thought to be not especially related to the "real" Thomasomyini from the northern Andes and the Amazon rainforest. The genera Wiedomys and Sigmodon are generally placed in their own tribe, and the "phyllotines" Irenomys, Punomys, Euneomys, and Reithrodon are considered incertae sedis.

The name "Sigmodontinae" is based on the name of the type genus, Sigmodon. This name in turn derives from the Greek roots for "S-tooth" (sigm- for "S" and odont- for "tooth", as in orthodontist) for the characteristic of the molars having an S-shape when viewed from above.

== Species ==
The Sigmodontinae are divided into a number of tribes and genera:

- Sigmodontalia
  - Tribe Sigmodontini
    - Genus †Prosigmodon
      - Prosigmodon chihuahuensis
      - Prosigmodon ferrusquiai
      - Prosigmodon holocuspis
      - Prosigmodon oroscoi
      - Prosigmodon tecolotum
    - Genus Sigmodon - cotton rats
      - Subgenus Sigmodon
        - Sigmodon hispidus species group
          - Allen's cotton rat, Sigmodon alleni
          - Arizona cotton rat, Sigmodon arizonae
          - Southern cotton rat, Sigmodon hirsutus
          - Hispid cotton rat, Sigmodon hispidus
          - Jaliscan cotton rat, Sigmodon mascotensis
          - Yellow-nosed cotton rat, Sigmodon ochrognathus
          - Miahuatlán cotton rat, Sigmodon planifrons
          - Toltec cotton rat, Sigmodon toltecus
          - Montane cotton rat, Sigmodon zanjonensis
        - Sigmodon fulviventer species group
          - Tawny-bellied cotton rat, Sigmodon fulviventer
          - Unexpected cotton rat, Sigmodon inopinatus
          - White-eared cotton rat, Sigmodon leucotis
          - Peruvian cotton rat, Sigmodon peruanus
      - Subgenus Sigmomys
        - Alston's cotton rat, Sigmodon alstoni
  - Tribe Ichthyomyini - fish- and crab-eating rats & water mice
    - Subtribe Anotomyina
      - Genus Anotomys - Ecuadorian fish-eating rat
        - Aquatic rat, Anotomys leander
    - Subtribe Ichthyomyina
      - Genus Chibchanomys - water mice
        - Chibchan water mouse, Chibchanomys trichotis
      - Genus Daptomys
        - Ferreira's fish-eating rat, Daptomys ferreirai
        - Musso's fish-eating rat, Daptomys mussoi
        - Oyapock's fish-eating rat, Daptomys oyapocki
        - Peruvian fish-eating rat, Daptomys peruviensis
        - Venezuelan fish-eating rat, Daptomys venezuelae
      - Genus Ichthyomys - crab-eating rats
        - Crab-eating rat, Ichthyomys hydrobates
        - Ichthyomys orientalis
        - Pine's crab-eating rat, Ichthyomys pinei
        - Pittier's crab-eating rat, Ichthyomys pittieri
        - Stolzmann's crab-eating rat, Ichthyomys stolzmanni
        - Tweedy's crab-eating rat, Ichthyomys tweedii
      - Genus Neusticomys - fish-eating rats
        - Montane fish-eating rat, Neusticomys monticolus
        - Las Cajas water mouse, Neusticomys orcesi
        - Neusticomys vossi
      - Genus Rheomys - water mice
        - Mexican water mouse, Rheomys mexicanus
        - Goldman's water mouse, Rheomys raptor
        - Thomas's water mouse, Rheomys thomasi
        - Underwood's water mouse, Rheomys underwoodi
- Oryzomyalia
  - Tribe Oryzomyini - rice rats, marsh rats, bristly mice, cane mice
    - Genus Aegialomys
      - Galápagos rice rat, Aegialomys galapagoensis
      - Yellowish rice rat, Aegialomys xanthaeolus
    - Genus Amphinectomys - Ucayali water rat
      - Ucayali water rat, Amphinectomys savamis
    - Genus Cerradomys
      - Cerradomys langguthi
      - Cerradomys maracajuensis
      - Cerradomys marinhus
      - Lindbergh's oryzomys, Cerradomys scotti (including Oryzomys andersoni)
      - Terraced rice rat, Cerradomys subflavus
      - Cerradomys vivoi
    - Genus Drymoreomys
      - Drymoreomys albimaculatus
    - Genus Eremoryzomys
      - Grey rice rat, Eremoryzomys polius
    - Genus Euryoryzomys
      - Emmons's rice rat, Euryoryzomys emmonsae
      - Monster rice rat, Euryoryzomys lamia
      - Big-headed rice rat, Euryoryzomys legatus
      - MacConnell's rice rat, Euryoryzomys macconnelli
      - Elegant rice rat, Euryoryzomys nitidus
      - Russet rice rat, Euryoryzomys russatus
    - Genus Handleyomys
      - Alfaro's rice rat, Handleyomys alfaroi
      - Chapman's rice rat, Handleyomys chapmani
      - Dusky-footed Handley's mouse, Handleyomys fuscatus
      - Colombian rice rat, Handleyomys intectus
      - Black-eared rice rat, Handleyomys melanotis
      - Striped rice rat, Handleyomys rhabdops
      - Long-nosed rice rat, Handleyomys rostratus
      - Cloud forest rice rat, Handleyomys saturatior
    - Genus Holochilus - marsh rats
      - Web-footed marsh rat, Holochilus brasiliensis
      - Chaco marsh rat, Holochilus chacarius
      - Amazonian marsh rat (or common marsh rat), Holochilus sciureus
    - Genus Hylaeamys
      - Hylaeamys acritus
      - Hylaeamys laticeps
      - Large-headed rice rat, Hylaeamys megacephalus
      - Sowbug rice rat, Hylaeamys oniscus
      - Hylaeamys perenensis
      - Tate's rice rat, Hylaeamys tatei
      - Yungas rice rat, Hylaeamys yunganus
    - Genus Lundomys - Lund's amphibious rat
      - Lund's amphibious rat, Lundomys molitor
    - Genus Megalomys † - giant rice rats
      - Barbuda giant rice-rat, Megalomys audreyae †
      - Megalomys curazensis †
      - Antillean giant rice rat, Megalomys desmarestii †
      - Santa Lucian pilorie, Megalomys luciae †
    - Genus Melanomys - dark rice rats
      - Dusky rice rat, Melanomys caliginosus
      - Robust dark rice rat, Melanomys robustulus
      - Zuniga's dark rice rat, Melanomys zunigae
    - Genus Microakodontomys - Brasilia's mouse
      - Transitional colilargo, Microakodontomys transitorius
    - Genus Microryzomys - small rice rats
      - Highland small rice rat, Microryzomys altissimus
      - Forest small rice rat, Microryzomys minutus
    - Genus Mindomys
      - Hammond's rice rat, Mindomys hammondi
    - Genus Neacomys - bristly mice
      - Dubost's bristly mouse, Neacomys dubosti
      - Guiana bristly mouse, Neacomys guianae
      - Small bristly mouse, Neacomys minutus
      - Musser's bristly mouse, Neacomys musseri
      - Paracou bristly mouse, Neacomys paracou
      - Painted bristly mouse, Neacomys pictus
      - Common bristly mouse, Neacomys spinosus
      - Narrow-footed bristly mouse, Neacomys tenuipes
    - Genus Nectomys - water rats
      - Western Amazonian nectomys, Nectomys apicalis
      - Magdalena nectomys, Nectomys magdalenae
      - Trinidad water rat, Nectomys palmipes
      - Amazonian nectomys, Nectomys rattus
      - South American water rat, Nectomys squamipes
    - Genus Nephelomys
      - Tomes's rice rat, Nephelomys albigularis
      - Ecuadorian rice rat, Nephelomys auriventer
      - Caracol rice rat, Nephelomys caracolus
      - Nephelomys childi
      - Boquete rice rat, Nephelomys devius
      - Keays's rice rat, Nephelomys keaysi
      - Light-footed rice rat, Nephelomys levipes
      - Nephelomys meridensis
      - Nephelomys moerex
      - Nephelomys nimbosus
      - Nephelomys pectoralis
      - Mount Pirre rice rat, Nephelomys pirrensis
    - Genus Nesoryzomys - Galapagos mice
      - Darwin's Galápagos mouse, Nesoryzomys darwini †
      - Fernandina rice rat, Nesoryzomys fernandinae
      - Indefatigable Galápagos mouse, Nesoryzomys indefessus
      - Santiago Galápagos mouse, Nesoryzomys swarthi
    - Genus Noronhomys - Vespucci's rodent †
      - Vespucci's rodent, Noronhomys vespuccii †
    - Genus Oecomys - Arboreal rice rats
      - North Amazonian arboreal rice rat, Oecomys auyantepui
      - Bicolored arboreal rice rat, Oecomys bicolor
      - Atlantic Forest oecomys, Oecomys catherinae
      - Cleber's arboreal rice rat, Oecomys cleberi
      - Unicolored rice rat, Oecomys concolor
      - Yellow arboreal rice rat, Oecomys flavicans
      - Mamore arboreal rice rat, Oecomys mamorae
      - Brazilian arboreal rice rat, Oecomys paricola
      - Dusky arboreal rice rat, Oecomys phaeotis
      - King arboreal rice rat, Oecomys rex
      - Robert's arboreal rice rat, Oecomys roberti
      - Red arboreal rice rat, Oecomys rutilus
      - Venezuelan arboreal rice rat, Oecomys speciosus
      - Foothill arboreal rice rat, Oecomys superans
      - Oecomys sydandersoni
      - Long-furred rice rat, Oecomys trinitatis
    - Genus Oligoryzomys - pygmy rice rats
      - Andean pygmy rice rat, Oligoryzomys andinus
      - Sandy pygmy rice rat, Oligoryzomys arenalis
      - Brenda's colilargo, Oligoryzomys brendae
      - Chacoan pygmy rice rat, Oligoryzomys chacoensis
      - Destructive pygmy rice rat, Oligoryzomys destructor
      - Yellow pygmy rice rat, Oligoryzomys flavescens
      - Fornes' colilargo, Oligoryzomys fornesi
      - Fulvous pygmy rice rat, Oligoryzomys fulvescens
      - Grayish pygmy rice rat, Oligoryzomys griseolus
      - Long-tailed pygmy rice rat, Oligoryzomys longicaudatus
      - Magellanic pygmy rice rat, Oligoryzomys magellanicus
      - Small-eared pygmy rice rat, Oligoryzomys microtis
      - Oligoryzomys moojeni
      - Black-footed pygmy rice rat, Oligoryzomys nigripes
      - Oligoryzomys rupestris
      - Straw-colored pygmy rice rat, Oligoryzomys stramineus
      - Sprightly pygmy rice rat, Oligoryzomys vegetus
      - St. Vincent pygmy rice rat, Oligoryzomys victus †
    - Genus Oreoryzomys
      - Oreoryzomys balneator
    - Genus Oryzomys - rice rats
      - Oryzomys albiventer
      - Jamaican rice rat, Oryzomys antillarum †
      - Coues' rice rat, Oryzomys couesi
      - Thomas's rice rat, Oryzomys dimidiatus
      - Gorgas's rice rat, Oryzomys gorgasi
      - Oryzomys nelsoni †
      - Marsh rice rat, Oryzomys palustris
      - Lower California rice rat, Oryzomys peninsulae ?†
    - Genus Pseudoryzomys - false rice rats
      - Brazilian false rice rat, Pseudoryzomys simplex
    - Genus Scolomys- New World spiny mice
      - South American spiny mouse, Scolomys melanops
      - Ucayali spiny mouse, Scolomys ucayalensis
    - Genus Sigmodontomys - rice water rats
      - Alfaro's rice water rat, Sigmodontomys alfari
    - Genus Sooretamys
      - Rat-headed rice rat, Sooretamys angouya
    - Genus Tanyuromys
      - Harris's rice water rat, Tanyuromys aphrastus
      - Lee's long-tailed montane rat, Tanyuromys thomasleei
    - Genus Transandinomys
      - Long-whiskered rice rat, Transandinomys bolivaris
      - Transandinomys talamancae
    - Genus Zygodontomys - cane mice
      - Short-tailed cane mouse, Zygodontomys brevicauda
      - Colombian cane mouse, Zygodontomys brunneus
  - Tribe Thomasomyini
    - Genus Abrawayaomys - Ruschi's rat
      - Ruschi's rat, Abrawayaomys ruschii
    - Genus Aepeomys - montane mice
      - Olive montane mouse, Aepeomys lugens
      - Reig's montane mouse, Aepeomys reigi
    - Genus Chilomys - Columbian forest mouse
      - Colombian forest mouse, Chilomys instans
    - Genus Delomys - Atlantic Forest rats
      - Montane Atlantic Forest rat, Delomys collinus
      - Striped Atlantic Forest rat, Delomys dorsalis
      - Pallid Atlantic Forest rat, Delomys sublineatus
    - Genus Phaenomys - Rio de Janeiro arboreal rat
      - Rio de Janeiro arboreal rat, Phaenomys ferrugineus
    - Genus Rhagomys - arboreal mice
      - Long-tongued arboreal mouse, Rhagomys longilingua
      - Brazilian arboreal mouse, Rhagomys rufescens
    - Genus Rhipidomys - climbing mice
      - Southern climbing mouse, Rhipidomys austrinus
      - Cariri climbing mouse, Rhipidomys cariri
      - Cauca climbing mouse, Rhipidomys caucensis
      - Coues's climbing mouse, Rhipidomys couesi
      - Eastern Amazon climbing mouse, Rhipidomys emiliae
      - Buff-bellied climbing mouse, Rhipidomys fulviventer
      - Gardner's climbing mouse, Rhipidomys gardneri
      - Broad-footed climbing mouse, Rhipidomys latimanus
      - White-footed climbing mouse, Rhipidomys leucodactylus
      - MacConnell's climbing mouse, Rhipidomys macconnelli
      - Cerrado climbing mouse, Rhipidomys macrurus
      - Atlantic Forest climbing mouse, Rhipidomys mastacalis
      - Peruvian climbing mouse, Rhipidomys modicus
      - Splendid climbing mouse, Rhipidomys nitela
      - Yellow-bellied climbing mouse, Rhipidomys ochrogaster
      - Venezuelan climbing mouse, Rhipidomys venezuelae
      - Charming climbing mouse, Rhipidomys venustus
      - Wetzel's climbing mouse, Rhipidomys wetzeli
    - Genus Thomasomys - Oldfield mice
      - Anderson's Oldfield mouse, Thomasomys andersoni
      - Apeco Oldfield mouse, Thomasomys apeco
      - Golden Oldfield mouse, Thomasomys aureus
      - Beady-eyed mouse, Thomasomys baeops
      - Silky Oldfield mouse, Thomasomys bombycinus
      - White-tipped Oldfield mouse, Thomasomys caudivarius
      - Ashy-bellied Oldfield mouse, Thomasomys cinereiventer
      - Ash-colored Oldfield mouse, Thomasomys cinereus
      - Cinnamon-colored Oldfield mouse, Thomasomys cinnameus
      - Daphne's Oldfield mouse, Thomasomys daphne
      - Peruvian Oldfield mouse, Thomasomys eleusis
      - Wandering Oldfield mouse, Thomasomys erro
      - Slender Oldfield mouse, Thomasomys gracilis
      - Hudson's Oldfield mouse, Thomasomys hudsoni
      - Woodland Oldfield mouse, Thomasomys hylophilus
      - Inca Oldfield mouse, Thomasomys incanus
      - Strong-tailed Oldfield mouse, Thomasomys ischyrus
      - Kalinowski's Oldfield mouse, Thomasomys kalinowskii
      - Ladew's Oldfield mouse, Thomasomys ladewi
      - Soft-furred Oldfield mouse, Thomasomys laniger**
      - Large-eared Oldfield mouse, Thomasomys macrotis
      - Unicolored Oldfield mouse, Thomasomys monochromos
      - Snow-footed Oldfield mouse, Thomasomys niveipes
      - Distinguished Oldfield mouse, Thomasomys notatus
      - Ashaninka Oldfield mouse, Thomasomys onkiro
      - Montane Oldfield mouse, Thomasomys oreas
      - Paramo Oldfield mouse, Thomasomys paramorum
      - Popayán Oldfield mouse, Thomasomys popayanus
      - Cajamarca Oldfield mouse, Thomasomys praetor
      - Thomas's Oldfield mouse, Thomasomys pyrrhonotus
      - Rhoads's Oldfield mouse, Thomasomys rhoadsi
      - Rosalinda's Oldfield mouse, Thomasomys rosalinda
      - Forest Oldfield mouse, Thomasomys silvestris
      - Taczanowski's Oldfield mouse, Thomasomys taczanowskii
      - Ucucha Oldfield mouse, Thomasomys ucucha
      - Dressy Oldfield mouse, Thomasomys vestitus
      - Pichincha Oldfield mouse, Thomasomys vulcani
    - Genus Wilfredomys - Wilfred's mice
      - Greater Wilfred's mouse, Wilfredomys oenax
  - Tribe Wiedomyini
    - Genus Cholomys †
      - Cholomys pearsoni †
    - Genus Wiedomys - red-nosed mouse
      - Cerrado red-nosed mouse, Wiedomys cerradensis
      - Red-nosed mouse, Wiedomys pyrrhorhinos
  - Tribe Abrotrichini
    - Genus Abrothrix
      - Andean altiplano mouse, Abrothrix andinus
      - Hershkovitz's grass mouse, Abrothrix hershkovitzi
      - Gray grass mouse, Abrothrix illuteus
      - Jelski's altiplano mouse, Abrothrix jelskii
      - Woolly grass mouse, Abrothrix lanosus
      - Long-haired grass mouse, Abrothrix longipilis
      - Olive grass mouse, Abrothrix olivaceus
      - Sanborn's grass mouse, Abrothrix sanborni
    - Genus Chelemys - long-clawed mice
      - Magellanic long-clawed akodont, Chelemys delfini
      - Andean long-clawed mouse, Chelemys macronyx
      - Large long-clawed mouse, Chelemys megalonyx
    - Genus Geoxus - long-clawed mole mouse
      - Long-clawed mole mouse, Geoxus valdivianus
      - Pearson's long-clawed mouse, Geoxus annectens
    - Genus Notiomys - Edward's long-clawed mouse
      - Edwards's long-clawed mouse, Notiomys edwardsii
  - Tribe Akodontini
    - Genus Akodon - South American grass mice
      - Highland grass mouse, Akodon aerosus
      - Colombian grass mouse, Akodon affinis
      - White-bellied grass mouse, Akodon albiventer
      - Azara's grass mouse, Akodon azarae
      - Bolivian grass mouse, Akodon boliviensis
      - Budin's grass mouse, Akodon budini
      - Akodon caenosus
      - Cursor grass mouse, Akodon cursor
      - Day's grass mouse, Akodon dayi
      - Dolorous grass mouse, Akodon dolores
      - Smoky grass mouse, Akodon fumeus
      - Akodon glaucinus
      - Intelligent grass mouse, Akodon iniscatus
      - Junín grass mouse, Akodon juninensis
      - Koford's grass mouse, Akodon kofordi
      - Lindbergh's grass mouse, Akodon lindberghi
      - Altiplano grass mouse, Akodon lutescens
      - Thespian grass mouse, Akodon mimus
      - Molina's grass mouse, Akodon molinae
      - Soft grass mouse, Akodon mollis
      - Montane grass mouse, Akodon montensis
      - Caparaó grass mouse, Akodon mystax
      - Neuquén grass mouse, Akodon neocenus
      - El Dorado grass mouse, Akodon orophilus
      - Paraná grass mouse, Akodon paranaensis
      - Tarija akodont, Akodon pervalens
      - Philip Myers's akodont, Akodon philipmyersi
      - Akodon polopi
      - Reig's grass mouse, Akodon reigi
      - São Paulo grass mouse, Akodon sanctipaulensis
      - Serra do Mar grass mouse, Akodon serrensis
      - Cochabamba grass mouse, Akodon siberiae
      - White-throated grass mouse, Akodon simulator
      - Spegazzini's grass mouse, Akodon spegazzinii
      - Puno grass mouse, Akodon subfuscus
      - Silent grass mouse, Akodon surdus
      - Forest grass mouse, Akodon sylvanus
      - Akodon tartareus
      - Chaco grass mouse, Akodon toba
      - Cloud forest grass mouse, Akodon torques
      - Variable grass mouse, Akodon varius
    - Genus Neomicroxus
      - Bogotá grass mouse, Neomicroxus bogotensis
      - Ecuadorian grass mouse, Neomicroxus latebricola
    - Genus Bibimys - crimson-nosed rats
      - Chaco crimson-nosed rat, Bibimys chacoensis
      - Large-lipped crimson-nosed rat, Bibimys labiosus
      - Torres's crimson-nosed rat, Bibimys torresi
    - Genus Blarinomys - Brazilian shrew-mouse
      - Brazilian shrew-mouse, Blarinomys breviceps
    - Genus Brucepattersonius
      - Grey-bellied brucie, Brucepattersonius griserufescens
      - Guaraní brucie, Brucepattersonius guarani
      - Red-bellied brucie, Brucepattersonius igniventris
      - Ihering's hocicudo, Brucepattersonius iheringi
      - Misiones brucie, Brucepattersonius misionensis
      - Arroyo of Paradise brucie, Brucepattersonius paradisus
      - Soricine brucie, Brucepattersonius soricinus
    - Genus Deltamys - Kemp's grass mouse
      - Kemp's grass mouse, Deltamys kempi
    - Genus Juscelinomys - burrowing mice
      - Candango mouse, Juscelinomys candango †
      - Rio Guaporé mouse, Juscelinomys guaporensis
      - Huanchaca mouse, Juscelinomys huanchacae
    - Genus Kunsia - giant rats
      - Fossorial giant rat, Kunsia fronto
      - Woolly giant rat, Kunsia tomentosus
    - Genus Lenoxus - Andean rat
      - Andean rat, Lenoxus apicalis
    - Genus Necromys - bolo mice
      - Pleasant bolo mouse, Necromys amoenus
      - Argentine bolo mouse, Necromys benefactus
      - Rufous-bellied bolo mouse, Necromys lactens
      - Hairy-tailed bolo mouse, Necromys lasiurus
      - Paraguayan bolo mouse, Necromys lenguarum
      - Dark bolo mouse, Necromys obscurus
      - Spotted bolo mouse, Necromys punctulatus
      - Temchuk's bolo mouse, Necromys temchuki
      - Northern grass mouse, Necromys urichi
    - Genus Oxymycterus - hocicudos
      - Argentine hocicudo, Oxymycterus akodontius
      - Amazon hocicudo, Oxymycterus amazonicus
      - Angular hocicudo, Oxymycterus angularis
      - Caparao hocicudo, Oxymycterus caparaoe
      - Atlantic Forest hocicudo, Oxymycterus dasytrichus
      - Spy hocicudo, Oxymycterus delator
      - Small hocicudo, Oxymycterus hiska
      - Hispid hocicudo, Oxymycterus hispidus
      - Quechuan hocicudo, Oxymycterus hucucha
      - Incan hocicudo, Oxymycterus inca
      - Cook's hocicudo, Oxymycterus josei
      - Long-nosed hocicudo, Oxymycterus nasutus
      - Paramo hocicudo, Oxymycterus paramensis
      - Quaestor hocicudo, Oxymycterus quaestor
      - Robert's hocicudo, Oxymycterus roberti
      - Red hocicudo, Oxymycterus rufus
      - Oxymycterus wayku
    - Genus Podoxymys - Roraima mouse
      - Roraima mouse, Podoxymys roraimae
    - Genus Scapteromys - swamp rat
      - Argentine swamp rat, Scapteromys aquaticus
      - Waterhouse's swamp rat, Scapteromys tumidus
    - Genus Thalpomys - cerrado mice
      - Cerrado mouse, Thalpomys cerradensis
      - Hairy-eared cerrado mouse, Thalpomys lasiotis
    - Genus Thaptomys - ebony akodont
      - Blackish grass mouse, Thaptomys nigrita
  - Tribe Phyllotini
    - Genus Andalgalomys - chaco mice
      - Olrog's chaco mouse, Andalgalomys olrogi
      - Pearson's chaco mouse, Andalgalomys pearsoni
      - Roig's chaco mouse, Andalgalomys roigi
    - Genus Andinomys - Andean mouse
      - Andean mouse, Andinomys edax
    - Genus Auliscomys - big-eared mice
      - Bolivian big-eared mouse, Auliscomys boliviensis
      - Painted big-eared mouse, Auliscomys pictus
      - Andean big-eared mouse, Auliscomys sublimis
    - Genus Calassomys
      - Calassomys apicalis
    - Genus Calomys - vesper mice
      - Bolivian vesper mouse, Calomys boliviae
      - Crafty vesper mouse, Calomys callidus
      - Large vesper mouse, Calomys callosus
      - Calomys cerqueirai
      - Caatinga vesper mouse, Calomys expulsus
      - Fecund vesper mouse, Calomys fecundus
      - Hummelinck's vesper mouse, Calomys hummelincki
      - Small vesper mouse, Calomys laucha
      - Andean vesper mouse, Calomys lepidus
      - Drylands vesper mouse, Calomys musculinus
      - Peruvian vesper mouse, Calomys sorellus
      - Delicate vesper mouse, Calomys tener
      - Tocantins vesper mouse, Calomys tocantinsi
      - Córdoba vesper mouse, Calomys venustus
    - Genus Chinchillula - altiplano chinchilla mouse
      - Altiplano chinchilla mouse, Chinchillula sahamae
    - Genus Eligmodontia - silky desert mice
      - Monte gerbil mouse, Eligmodontia moreni
      - Andean gerbil mouse, Eligmodontia puerulus
      - Eligmodontia hirtipes (recently separated from Eligmodontia puerulus)
      - Morgan's gerbil mouse, Eligmodontia morgani
      - Eastern Patagonian laucha, Eligmodontia typus
      - Highland gerbil mouse, Eligmodontia (typus) bolsonensis
    - Genus Euneomys - chinchilla mice
      - Patagonian chinchilla mouse, Euneomys chinchilloides
      - Burrowing chinchilla mouse, Euneomys fossor
      - Biting chinchilla mouse, Euneomys mordax
      - Peterson's chinchilla mouse, Euneomys petersoni
    - Genus Galenomys - Garlepp's mouse
      - Garlepp's mouse, Galenomys garleppi
    - Genus Graomys - leaf-eared mice
      - Central leaf-eared mouse, Graomys centralis
      - Pale leaf-eared mouse, Graomys domorum
      - Edith's leaf-eared mouse, Graomys edithae
      - Gray leaf-eared mouse, Graomys griseoflavus
    - Genus Ichthyurodon †
      - Ichthyurodon ameghinoi †
    - Genus Irenomys - Chilean climbing mouse
      - Chilean climbing mouse, Irenomys tarsalis
    - Genus Loxodontomys
      - Southern big-eared mouse, Loxodontomys micropus
      - Pikumche pericote, Loxodontomys pikumche
    - Genus Neotomys - Andean swamp rat
      - Andean swamp rat, Neotomys ebriosus
    - Genus Olympicomys †
      - Olympicomys vossi †
    - Genus Phyllotis - leaf-eared mice
      - Friendly leaf-eared mouse, Phyllotis amicus
      - Andean leaf-eared mouse, Phyllotis andium
      - Anita's leaf-eared mouse, Phyllotis anitae
      - Buenos Aires leaf-eared mouse, Phyllotis bonariensis
      - Capricorn leaf-eared mouse, Phyllotis caprinus
      - Darwin's leaf-eared mouse, Phyllotis darwini
      - Definitive leaf-eared mouse, Phyllotis definitus
      - Haggard's leaf-eared mouse, Phyllotis haggardi
      - Lima leaf-eared mouse, Phyllotis limatus
      - Master leaf-eared mouse, Phyllotis magister
      - Osgood's leaf-eared mouse, Phyllotis osgoodi
      - Bunchgrass leaf-eared mouse, Phyllotis osilae
      - Wolffsohn's leaf-eared mouse, Phyllotis wolffsohni
      - Yellow-rumped leaf-eared mouse, Phyllotis xanthopygus
    - Genus Punomys - puna mouse
      - Eastern puna mouse, Punomys kofordi
      - Puna mouse, Punomys lemminus
    - Genus Reithrodon - bunny rat
      - Bunny rat, Reithrodon auritus
      - Naked-soled conyrat, Reithrodon typicus
    - Genus Salinomys
      - Delicate salt flat mouse, Salinomys delicatus
    - Genus Tafimys †
      - Tafimys powelli
    - Genus Tapecomys - primordial tapecua
      - Primordial tapecua, Tapecomys primus

Incertae sedis

- Genus Juliomys
  - Juliomys ossitenuis
  - Juliomys pictipes
  - Juliomys rimofrons
- Genus Megaoryzomys †
  - Galápagos giant rat, Megaoryzomys curioi †
- Genus Cordimus †
  - Cordimus debuisonjei † (type species)
  - Cordimus hooijeri †
  - Cordimus raton †

== See also ==
- New World rats and mice
