= Big-headed rice rat =

Big-headed rice rat may refer to either of two oryzomyine rodents:

- Euryoryzomys legatus, Tarija oryzomys
- Euryoryzomys russatus, russet oryzomys or russet rice rat
