= Nephelomys childi =

Scientific classification
- Domain: Eukaryota
- Kingdom: Animalia
- Phylum: Chordata
- Class: Mammalia
- Order: Rodentia
- Family: Cricetidae
- Subfamily: Sigmodontinae
- Genus: Nephelomys
- Species: N. childi

Binomial name
- Nephelomys childi (Thomas, 1895)

Synonyms
- Oryzomys childi Thomas, 1895; Oryzomys o'connelli J.A. Allen, 1913 [Nephelomys] childi: Weksler, Percequillo, and Voss, 2006

Species of rodent

Nephelomys childi is a species of rodent in the genus Nephelomys of family Cricetidae. The type locality is at Bogotá, Colombia, and the type locality of its junior synonym, oconnelli, is at a place known as Buenavista, about 50 miles (80 km) southeast of Bogotá. It was named after Mr. George D. Child, who assisted in obtaining the type series.

The holotype is a medium-sized animal with a long tail. The fur on the back is relatively long, at 11 to 12 millimetres (0.43 to 0.47 in). The upperparts are generally grey–brown in color, with a darker patch at the middle of the back. There is a clear separation in color between the upperparts and the underparts, which have light grey hairs with white tips. The upper surface of the long feet is whitish. The large ears are black and covered with fine hairs. The tail is brown above and near-white below. The head and body length is 131 millimetres (5.16 in), the tail length is 143 millimetres (5.63 in), the hindfoot length is 31 millimetres (1.22 in), and the ear length is 16 millimetres (0.63 in).

Both N. childi and its synonym oconnelli were originally described as species of Oryzomys, Oryzomys childi and Oryzomys o'connelli. They were compared, respectively, to O. meridensis (currently Nephelomys meridensis) and O. pectoralis (currently Nephelomys pectoralis). Later they were submerged in a broadly defined Oryzomys albigularis (currently Nephelomys albigularis), but when the genus Nephelomys was extracted from Oryzomys in 2006, N. childi was reinstated as a separate species.

== Literature cited ==
- Allen, J.A. 1913. New South American Muridae. Bulletin of the American Museum of Natural History 32:597–604.
- Musser, G.G. and Carleton, M.D. 2005. Superfamily Muroidea. Pp. 894–1531 in Wilson, D.E. and Reeder, D.M. (eds.). Mammal Species of the World: a taxonomic and geographic reference. 3rd ed. Baltimore: The Johns Hopkins University Press, 2 vols., 2142 pp. ISBN 978-0-8018-8221-0
- Thomas, O. 1895. On small mammals from Nicaragua and Bogota. Annals and Magazine of Natural History (6)16:55–60.
- Weksler, M.; Percequillo, A. R.; Voss, R. S. (2006-10-19). "Ten new genera of oryzomyine rodents (Cricetidae: Sigmodontinae)" (PDF). American Museum Novitates (3537). American Museum of Natural History: 1–29. doi:10.1206/0003-0082(2006)3537[1:TNGOOR]2.0.CO;2. hdl:2246/5815. S2CID 84088556.
