= Posterolateral palatal pits =

Gaps at the back of the bony palate in rodents

In anatomy, posterolateral palatal pits are gaps at the sides of the back of the bony palate, near the last molars. Posterolateral palatal pits are present, in various degrees of development, in several members of the rodent family Cricetidae. Many members of the family lack them or have only simple pits, but Arvicolinae (voles, lemmings, and relatives) and Oryzomyini (rice rats and relatives) have more highly developed posterolateral palatal pits. Posterolateral palatal pits are also present in some other rodents, including Glis, Jaculus, Hystrix, Abrocoma, Ctenomys, Chinchilla, and Lagidium.

== Sigmodontinae ==
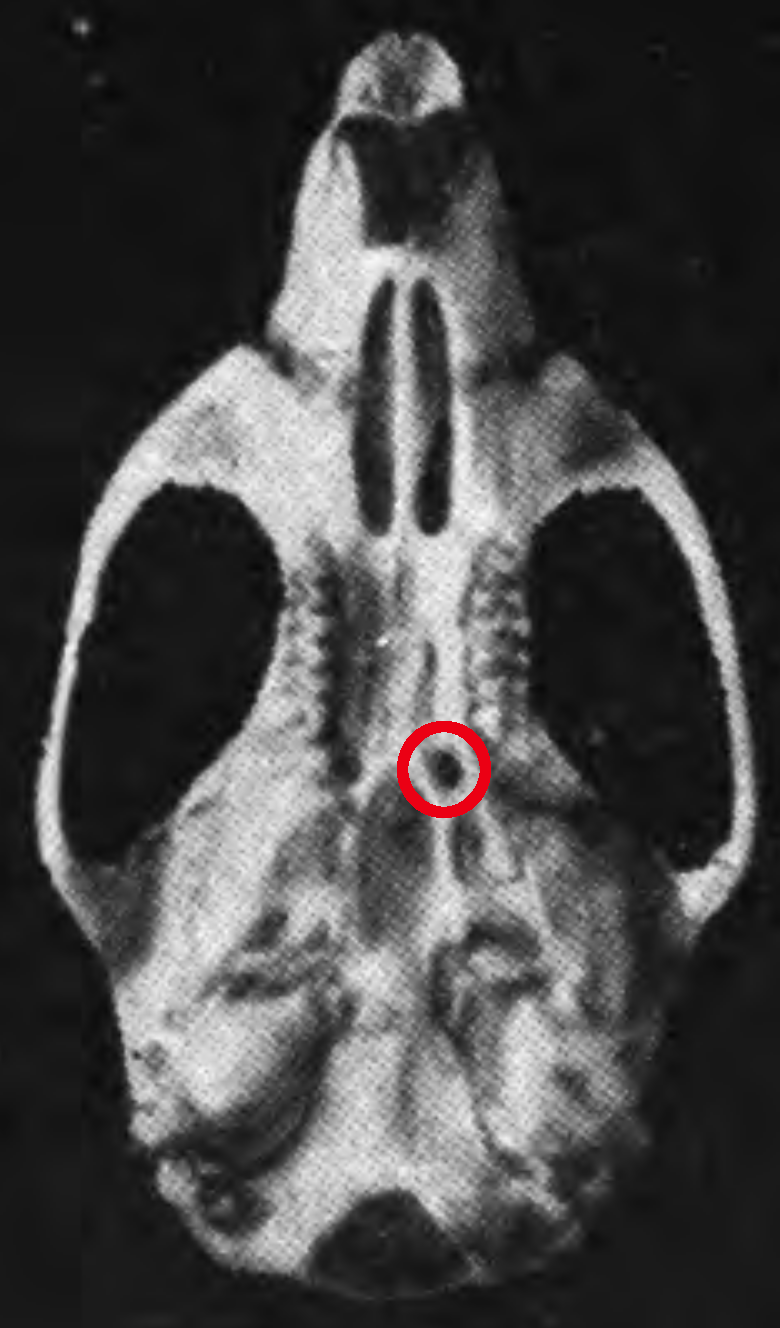
The western Mexican oryzomyine Oryzomys peninsulae (skull, seen from below, with left posterolateral palatal pits indicated by a red circle) has the pits recessed into a fossa.

Many members of the mainly South American cricetid subfamily Sigmodontinae have posterolateral palatal pits.

In Oryzomyini (rice rats), the largest tribe of the Sigmodontinae, all but some species—Mindomys hammondi and Sigmodontomys aphrastus usually have only one small pit on each side of the palate—have prominent posterolateral palatal pits, often more than one on each side of the palate. In many oryzomyines, the pits are located in a deep depression or fossa. This depression has been termed the "palatal fossa" in the genus Cerradomys; its varying depth serves as a diagnostic character separating some of the species. The presence of complex posterolateral palatal pits is a synapomorphy either of Oryzomyini or of Oryzomyini minus Mindomys. Members of the genus Nephelomys usually have complex posterolateral palatal pits, recessed into deep fossae, but N. caracolus and N. nimbosus have simpler pits. One of the putative subdivisions within Oryzomyini, Clade D, has posterolateral palatal pits recessed into a fossa as one of its synapomorphies, although the feature is reversed in several subgroups. The extinct island endemic Noronhomys vespuccii also had smaller pits, perhaps because of its short palate.

Among members of the tribe Thomasomyini, posterolateral palatal pits are small or absent. Aepeomys lacks them, but Rhagomys longilingua does have posterolateral palatal pits. The possible thomasomyine Abrawayaomys chebezi has small posterolateral palatal pits.

Members of the Phyllotini tribe always have posterolateral palatal pits. In some species, they are displaced to the back from their usual position just before the mesopterygoid fossa into the fossa. The condition of the pits has been used to separate species of Phyllotis.

The tribe Ichthyomyini is characterized by inconspicuous posterolateral palatal pits.

== Arvicolinae ==
Arvicolinae, a group that includes the voles and lemmings, usually have posterolateral palatal pits, but the configuration of the pits is variable. In some species, the pits do not extend to the ventral face of the palate.

== Neotominae ==
Posterolateral palatal pits are poorly developed or absent in many members of the mostly North American subfamily Neotominae, including Peromyscus (deer mice) and related genera.

== Cladistics ==
The presence and development of posterolateral palatal pits has been used as a character in cladistic analyses of oryzomyines by Weksler (2006), Carleton and Olson (1999), and Carleton and Musser (1989); neotomines by Carleton (1980); and phyllotines by Steppan (1995).

== Literature cited ==
- Carleton, M.D. (1980). "Phylogenetic relationships in neotomine-peromyscine rodents (Muroidea) and a reappraisal of the dichotomy within New World Cricetinae". Miscellaneous Publications. 157: i–vii+1–146. hdl:2027.42/56401.
- Carleton, M.D. 1989. Systematics and evolution. Pp. 7–141 in Kirkland, G.L. and Layne, J.N. (eds.). Advances in the study of Peromyscus (Rodentia). Lubbock: Texas Tech University Press.
- Carleton, Michael D; Arroyo-Cabrales, Joaquin (2009). "Chapter 3. Review of the Oryzomys couesi Complex (Rodentia: Cricetidae: Sigmodontinae) in Western Mexico" (PDF). Bulletin of the American Museum of Natural History. 331: 94–127. CiteSeerX 10.1.1.666.8921. doi:10.1206/582-3.1. hdl:10088/8667. S2CID 42256389.
- Carleton, Michael D.; Musser, Guy G. (1989). "Systematic studies of oryzomyine rodents (Muridae, Sigmodontinae): a synopsis of Microryzomys". Bulletin of the American Museum of Natural History. 191: 1–83. hdl:2246/953.
- Carleton, Michael D.; Olson, Storrs L. (1999). "Amerigo Vespucci and the rat of Fernando de Noronha: a new genus and species of Rodentia (Muridae, Sigmodontinae) from a volcanic island off Brazil's continental shelf". American Museum Novitates (3256): 1–59. hdl:2246/3097.
- Goldman, Edward Alphonso (1918). The rice rats of North America. North American Fauna, volume 43. U.S. Government Printing Office.
- Hershkovitz, Philip (1962). "Evolution of neotropical cricetine rodents (Muridae) with special reference to the phyllotine group". Fieldiana. Zoology. 46. doi:10.5962/bhl.title.2781.
- Hooper, E.T.; Hart, B.S. (1962). "A synopsis of recent North American microtine rodents". Miscellaneous Publications. 120: 1–68. hdl:2027.42/56364.
- Jenkins, Paulina D.; Kilpatrick, C. William; Robinson, Mark F.; Timmins, Robert J. (2005). "Morphological and molecular investigations of a new family, genus and species of rodent (Mammalia: Rodentia: Hystricognatha) from Lao PDR". Systematics and Biodiversity. 2 (4): 419. doi:10.1017/S1477200004001549. hdl:10141/62742. S2CID 86411689.
- Luna, L. and Patterson, B.D. 2003. A remarkable new mouse (Muridae: Sigmodontinae) from southeastern Peru: with comments on the affinities of Rhagomys rufescens (Thomas, 1886). Fieldiana Zoology 101:1–24.
- Pardiñas, U.F.J., Teta, P. and D'Elía, G. 2009. Taxonomy and distribution of Abrawayaomys (Rodentia: Cricetidae), an Atlantic Forest endemic with the description of a new species. Zootaxa 2128:39–60.
- Percequillo, Alexandre R.; Hingst-Zaher, Erika; Bonvicino, Cibele R. (2008). "Systematic Review of Genus Cerradomys Weksler, Percequillo and Voss, 2006 (Rodentia: Cricetidae: Sigmodontinae: Oryzomyini), with Description of Two New Species from Eastern Brazil". American Museum Novitates (3622): 1. doi:10.1206/495.1. hdl:2246/5927. S2CID 86186786.
- Steppan, S.J. 1995. Revision of the tribe Phyllotini (Rodentia: Sigmodontinae), with a phylogenetic hypothesis for the Sigmodontinae. Fieldiana Zoology 80:1–112.
- Voss, Robert S. (1988). "Systematics and ecology of ichthyomyine rodents (Muroidea): patterns of morphological evolution in a small adaptive radiation". Bulletin of the American Museum of Natural History. 188: 259–493. hdl:2246/927.
- Voss, Robert S.; Carleton, Michael D. (1993). "A new genus for Hesperomys molitor Winge and Holochilus magnus Hershkovitz (Mammalia, Muridae) with an analysis of its phylogenetic relationships". American Museum Novitates (3085): 1–39. hdl:2246/4982.
- Voss, Robert S.; Lunde, Darrin P.; Simmons, Nancy B. (2001). "The Mammals of Paracou, French Guiana: A Neotropical Lowland Rainforest Fauna Part 2. Nonvolant Species". Bulletin of the American Museum of Natural History. 263: 3–236. doi:10.1206/0003-0090(2001)263<0003:TMOPFG>2.0.CO;2. hdl:2246/386. S2CID 83659613.
- Voss, Robert S.; Gómez-Laverde, Marcela; Pacheco, Victor (2002). "A New Genus for Aepeomys fuscatus Allen, 1912, and Oryzomys intectus Thomas, 1921: Enigmatic Murid Rodents from Andean Cloud Forests". American Museum Novitates (373): 1–42. doi:10.1206/0003-0082(2002)373<0001:ANGFAF>2.0.CO;2. hdl:2246/2862. S2CID 53477868.
- Weksler, Marcelo (2006). "Phylogenetic Relationships of Oryzomine Rodents (Muroidea: Sigmodontinae): Separate and Combined Analyses of Morphological and Molecular Data". Bulletin of the American Museum of Natural History. 296: 1–149. doi:10.1206/0003-0090(2006)296[0001:PROORM]2.0.CO;2. hdl:2246/5777. S2CID 86057173.
- Weksler, Marcelo; Percequillo, Alexandre Reis; Voss, Robert S. (2006). "Ten New Genera of Oryzomyine Rodents (Cricetidae: Sigmodontinae)". American Museum Novitates (3537): 1. doi:10.1206/0003-0082(2006)3537[1:TNGOOR]2.0.CO;2. hdl:2246/5815. S2CID 84088556.
