= Nephelomys moerex =

Scientific classification
- Domain: Eukaryota
- Kingdom: Animalia
- Phylum: Chordata
- Class: Mammalia
- Order: Rodentia
- Family: Cricetidae
- Subfamily: Sigmodontinae
- Genus: Nephelomys
- Species: N. moerex

Binomial name
- Nephelomys moerex (Thomas, 1914)

Synonyms
- Oryzomys albigularis moerex Thomas, 1914 [Nephelomys] moerex: Weksler, Percequillo, and Voss, 2006

Species of rodent

Nephelomys moerex is a species of rodent in the genus Nephelomys of family Cricetidae. The type locality is at Mindo in western Ecuador, where it has been recorded together with three other rodents of the oryzomyine group, Sigmodontomys aphrastus, Mindomys hammondi, and Handleyomys alfaroi, as well as three opossums, Chironectes minimus and unidentified species of Didelphis and Marmosa. Mindo is a "tiny agricultural community" located at 0°02'S, 78°48'W and 1,264 metres (4,150 ft) above sea level. It was originally described by Oldfield Thomas as a subspecies of Oryzomys albigularis. It remained synonymized under this species until it was recognized as a separate species when the genus Nephelomys was established for Oryzomys albigularis and related species in 2006.

Unlike in the type species of the genus, N. albigularis, the lacrimal bone of the skull is connected primarily to the maxillary bone, not equally to the maxillary and frontal bones. The incisive foramina, perforations in the palate between the incisors and the molars, are shorter than in some other Nephelomys species, not extending between the molars, and closer to the molars they are wider than further to the front, also unlike in some other species of the genus. These foramina are similar in shape to those in N. nimbosus. The alisphenoid strut, an extension of the alisphenoid bone of the skull which separates two openings in the skull, the buccinator–masticatory foramen and the accessory oval foramen, is usually present, although it is more commonly absent in other Nephelomys.

== Literature cited ==
- Anthony, H.E. 1926. Preliminary report on Ecuadorean mammals. No. 7. American Museum Novitates 240:1–6.
- Ellerman, J.R. 1941. The families and genera of living rodents. Vol. 2. Family Muridae. London: British Museum of Natural History, 690 pp.
- McCain, C.M., Timm, R.M. and Weksler, M. 2007. Redescription of the enigmatic long-tailed rat Sigmodontomys aphrastus (Cricetidae: Sigmodontinae) with comments on taxonomy and natural history. Proceedings of the Biological Society of Washington 120:117–136.
- Musser, G.G. and Carleton, M.D. 2005. Superfamily Muroidea. Pp. 894–1531 in Wilson, D.E. and Reeder, D.M. (eds.). Mammal Species of the World: a taxonomic and geographic reference. 3rd ed. Baltimore: The Johns Hopkins University Press, 2 vols., 2142 pp. ISBN 978-0-8018-8221-0
- Weksler, M.; Percequillo, A. R.; Voss, R. S. (19 October 2006). "Ten new genera of oryzomyine rodents (Cricetidae: Sigmodontinae)". American Museum Novitates (3537). American Museum of Natural History: 1–29. doi:10.1206/0003-0082(2006)3537[1:TNGOOR]2.0.CO;2. hdl:2246/5815. S2CID 84088556.
