= Ecuadorian rice rat =

Ecuadorian rice rat or Ecuadorian oryzomys (in various spellings) can refer to two species of rice rats:

- Nephelomys auriventer, Golden-bellied oryzomys
- Oreoryzomys balneator, Peruvian rice rat or Ecuadoran oryzomys
