= Nephelomys keaysi =

Conservation status
- Least Concern (IUCN 3.1)

Scientific classification
- Kingdom: Animalia
- Phylum: Chordata
- Class: Mammalia
- Order: Rodentia
- Family: Cricetidae
- Subfamily: Sigmodontinae
- Genus: Nephelomys
- Species: N. keaysi

Binomial name
- Nephelomys keaysi (J.A. Allen, 1900)

Synonyms
- Oryzomys keaysi J.A. Allen, 1900; Oryzomys obtusirostris J.A. Allen, 1900; Zygodontomys obtusirostris: J.A. Allen, 1913 [Nephelomys] keaysi: Weksler, Percequillo, and Voss, 2006

Species of rodent

Nephelomys keaysi, also known as Keays's oryzomys or Keays's rice rat, is a species of rodent in the genus Nephelomys of family Cricetidae. It is found from southeastern Peru to northern Bolivia on the eastern slope of the Andes in Yungas humid forest at altitudes of 1000 to 2600 m. Although its continued existence is not in serious danger and it is listed as "least concern", destruction of its habitat may pose a threat to some populations.

In 1900, Joel Asaph Allen described two rodents from Juliaca, Peru, at an altitude of 6,000 feet (1,800 m) on the basis of specimens collected in 1899 and 1900 by H. H. Keays. One he named, after Keays, Oryzomys keaysi, and the other Oryzomys obtusirostris. He considered the former to have no close relatives and the latter to be close to O. longicaudatus. Oldfield Thomas, in reporting on some specimens from Peru, concurred with the latter allocation, but considered O. keaysi to be part of the group around O. albigularis, and suggested that these should perhaps all be placed in the same species. After re-examining his specimens of O. obtusirostris, Allen reclassified the animal to the genus Zygodontomys in 1913, as Zygodontomys obtusirostris, but admitted that it was atypical for its long tail. In 1944, Philip Hershkovitz published a revision of the genus Nectomys as then understood, and in comparing it to what is now Sigmodontomys alfari, he listed, in a footnote, the names he understood as synonyms of Oryzomys albigularis. This list included both keaysi and obtusirostris, and since then the two have remained associated with each other and with O. albigularis, initially as synonyms or subspecies. By the 1990s, however, the distinctiveness of O. keaysi with respect to both O. albigularis and O. levipes was recognized, and as a result O. keaysi was again classified as a separate species, now with O. obtusirostris as a synonym. When O. albigularis and related species were transferred to the new genus Nephelomys in 2006, this arrangement remained in place, but with the species now known as Nephelomys keaysi.

== Literature cited ==
- Allen, J.A. 1900. On mammals collected in southeastern Peru by Mr. H. H. Keays, with descriptions of new species. Bulletin of the American Museum of Natural History 13:219–228.
- Allen, J.A. 1913. New South American Muridae. Bulletin of the American Museum of Natural History 32:597–604.
- Hershkovitz, P. 1944. A systematic review of the Neotropical water rats of the genus Nectomys (Cricetinae). Miscellaneous Publications Museum of Zoology, University of Michigan 58: 1–88.
- Musser, G.G. and Carleton, M.D. 2005. Superfamily Muroidea. Pp. 894–1531 in Wilson, D.E. and Reeder, D.M. (eds.). Mammal Species of the World: a taxonomic and geographic reference. 3rd ed. Baltimore: The Johns Hopkins University Press, 2 vols., 2142 pp. ISBN 978-0-8018-8221-0
- Thomas, O. 1901. New mammals from Peru and Bolivia, with a list of those collected from the Inambari River, Upper Madre de Dios. Annals and Magazine of Natural History (7)7:178–190.
- Weksler, M.; Percequillo, A. R.; Voss, R. S. (2006-10-19). "Ten new genera of oryzomyine rodents (Cricetidae: Sigmodontinae)". American Museum Novitates (3537). American Museum of Natural History: 1–29. doi:10.1206/0003-0082(2006)3537[1:TNGOOR]2.0.CO;2. hdl:2246/5815. S2CID 84088556.
- Social Insects Specialist Group (1996). "Anoplolepis nuptialis". IUCN Red List of Threatened Species. 1996 e.T1560A4881801. doi:10.2305/IUCN.UK.1996.RLTS.T1560A4881801.en.
