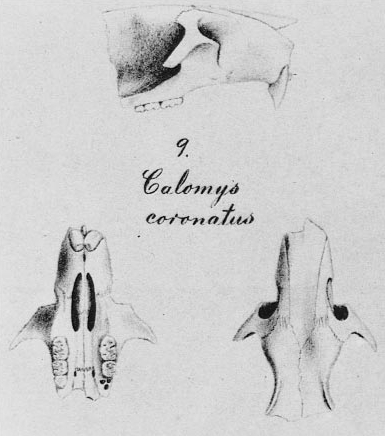
- Holotype partial cranium of Calomys coronatus Winge, 1887, a junior synonym

Conservation status
- Least Concern (IUCN 3.1)

Scientific classification
- Kingdom: Animalia
- Phylum: Chordata
- Class: Mammalia
- Order: Rodentia
- Family: Cricetidae
- Subfamily: Sigmodontinae
- Genus: Euryoryzomys
- Species: E. russatus

Binomial name
- Euryoryzomys russatus (Wagner, 1848)

Synonyms
- Calomys coronatus Winge, 1887; Oryzomys intermedius (Leche, 1886); Oryzomys kelloggi Avila-Pires, 1959; Oryzomys russatus (Wagner, 1848) [Euryoryzomys] russatus: Weksler, Percequillo, and Voss, 2006

= Euryoryzomys russatus =

Species of mammal (rodent)

Euryoryzomys russatus, also known as the russet oryzomys, russet rice rat, or big-headed rice rat, is a species of rodent in the family Cricetidae. It is a member of the genus Euryoryzomys, which was split off from Oryzomys in 2006. It was first described by Johann Andreas Wagner in 1848. It is found in southern Brazil, eastern Paraguay and northeastern Argentina. It is considered a large species in its genus, with a reddish-brown coat, long tail length, and large skull. It is a terrestrial rodent, spending its time foraging for seeds, fruits, and insects. It is listed by the IUCN as least concern, although studies have shown it to be influenced by anthropogenic disturbances. Predators consist of small members of the order Carnivora.

== Etymology ==
The prefix eury- comes from the Greek word 'eurys' meaning "wide" or "broad". The specific epithet russatus comes from the Latin word 'russatus', meaning "clothed in red".

== Taxonomy ==
Euryoryzomys russatus (Wagner, 1848) is the currently accepted name for the russet rice rat. It is a member of the order Rodentia and family Cricetidae with the genus Euryoryzomys comprising six valid species.

== Distribution and habitat ==
Euryoryzomys russatus is found in continental Brazil and outlying islands. This species is also found in Bolivia, Argentina, and Paraguay. It is found along altitudinal gradients consisting of lowland and mountainous (montane) areas. It is found in the Atlantic Forest as well as some areas of the Amazon rainforest.

Specific locations where E. russatus has been collected include: Desterro Environmental Conservation Unit central Santa Catarina Island, Brazil (live specimens); Alem Paraiba, Minas Gerais, Brazil (museum specimens); Guaricana National Park, Paraná, Brazil (museum specimens); Ilha do Cardoso, São Paulo, Brazil (museum specimens); Parana, Southern Brazil (genetic identification from scat of predatory felines); Picinguaba, São Paulo, Brazil (live specimens); Rio de Janeiro, Brazil (live specimens); Morro Grande Forest Reserve, São Paulo, Brazil (live specimens).

This species is considered a forest specialist, dwelling only in habitats that have extensive forest canopy cover. Abundance and immigration rates have been shown to increase as forest coverage increases.

== Life history ==
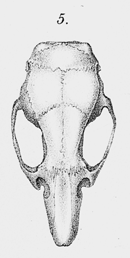
Dorsal view of cranium

=== Morphology ===
The genus Euryoryzomys is described as having pelage that varies from yellow in color to a red-brown dorsally, while having a lighter ventral color. The ears are typically medium to large. Vibrissae (whiskers) do not extend past the ears. Most species possess a jugal (with the exception of E. lamia).

Euryoryzomys russatus is described as having a large skull and relatively large body length; with a body length range of 112–185 mm (4.4–7.3 in). Weights have been recorded in some studies, and averaged 59 g (2.1 oz). The tail averages between 105–196 mm (4.1–7.7 in) in length. Pelage of the rice rat is a reddish-brown on the dorsal portion of the body and white on the ventral portion. The pinnae and tail are both grey in color. The fore and hindlimbs are a pale pink, along with the nose. The facial vibrissae are black in color. Parietals in E. russatus possess no lateral expansions.

=== Ecology ===
Euryoryzomys russatus is a nocturnal, terrestrial rodent that moves primarily over leaf litter found on the forest floor. A seasonal microhabitat selection study found variation in microhabitat choice in warm-wet and cool-dry seasons. E. russatus was shown to have greater abundance in areas with woody debris, low leaf litter height, and high arthropod biomass during the warm-wet season and during the cool-dry season the greatest abundance was seen in areas with high leaf litter humidity. It is an opportunistic eater, consuming seeds, fruit, and insects when possible. A study of seed predation in the Brazilian Atlantic forest found E. russatus to be an efficient seed predator, eating a majority of seeds offered (with an exception to those with a mass greater than that of the observed individuals).

A study of the population dynamics of a population of E. russatus on Santa Catarina Island in southern Brazil showed them to have nearly equal sex ratios. Populations of E. russatus have been shown to have a monogamous mating system. Females show reproductive activity throughout the year, and correlate with availability of food resources. The nests of E. russatus are cup-shaped, and built with fibers from bamboo and other grasses from the family Poaceae. Offspring are born altricial, lacking hair, and with eyes and ears closed. A study tracking individuals of E. russatus calculated the average number of offspring per pregnancy (from survey of pregnant females and nestlings) to be 3.6, with three to six nestlings being typical.

=== Genetics ===
Genetic analyses have grouped different populations of E. russatus into three clades using mitochondrial and nuclear gene regions, however no subspecies have been identified. A study focused on the genetic structuring of populations in the Atlantic Rain Forest of southern Brazil found no genetic structuring throughout the species distribution. Through karyotyping of E. russatus individuals from Parque Estadual da Serra do Mar (Santa Virginia, Brazil) it was found that they possess a chromosome number of 2n=80. This number is shared with E. emmonsae and E. nitidus.

== Conservation ==
Euryoryzomys russatus is listed as a species of least concern by the IUCN as of September 2016. However, studies have shown this species to be susceptible to anthropogenic disturbances such as habitat degradation or destruction.

== Predators ==
Studies have found the E. russatus to be a prey item of several neotropical feline species including jaguarundi (Puma yagouaroundi), oncilla (Leopardus tigrinus) and ocelot (Leopardus pardalis). Domestic cats (Felis silvestris catus) have also been shown to prey on E. russatus.

== Parasites ==
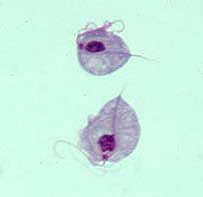
Example of Trichomonas sp. similar to that found in E. russatus

Research into the gastrointestinal parasites of E. russatus found eight different endoparasites in island and continental populations. A new species of nematode, Hassalstrongylus luquei, was found in the small intestine of E. russatus. A single individual was found to possess antibodies from a systemic fungal infection with Paracoccidioides brasiliensis. A study on Rickettsia rickettsii, Brazilian Spotted-fever has shown E. russatus to be a host for the tick species Amblyomma ovale, which is a known vector for the zoonotic disease.
