= Nephelomys nimbosus =

Scientific classification
- Kingdom: Animalia
- Phylum: Chordata
- Class: Mammalia
- Order: Rodentia
- Family: Cricetidae
- Subfamily: Sigmodontinae
- Genus: Nephelomys
- Species: N. nimbosus

Binomial name
- Nephelomys nimbosus (Anthony, 1926)

Synonyms
- Oryzomys auriventer nimbosus Anthony, 1926 [Nephelomys] nimbosus: Weksler, Percequillo, and Voss, 2006

Species of rodent

Nephelomys nimbosus is a species of rodent in the genus Nephelomys of family Cricetidae. Its type locality is at San Antonio on the northeastern slope of the Tungurahua in the Andes of Ecuador, at an altitude of about 6,700 feet (2,000 m). The type series included five individuals.

The fur of the upperparts is brown to blackish, becoming lighter towards the sides. The underparts are grayish, with a white patch at the throat. The long tail virtually lacks hairs and is darker above than below. In the holotype, the total length is 304 millimetres (11.97 in), the head and body length is 140 millimetres (5.51 in), the combined length of the tail vertebrae is 164 millimetres (6.46 in), the hindfoot length (including claws) is 34 millimetres (1.34 in), and the length of the skull is 35.5 millimetres (1.40 in). In most species of Nephelomys, the posterolateral palatal pits, perforations of the palate near the third molar, are conspicuous and receded into a depression or fossa, but in N. nimbosus and N. caracolus, they are much smaller.

It was first described, in 1926, by American zoologist H. E. Anthony as a subspecies of Oryzomys auriventer. It is smaller than that animal and differs in coloration and in the shape of the incisive foramina, which resembles that seen in N. moerex. In his description, Anthony anticipated that O. auriventer would eventually be demoted to a subspecies of Oryzomys albigularis, which was indeed done in the early 1960s. Subsequently, O. auriventer was reinstated as a species separate from, though related to, O. albigularis, and nimbosus was considered to belong to the same species. When the members of the Oryzomys albigularis group, including O. auriventer, were transferred to the new genus Nephelomys in 2006, N. nimbosus was recognized as a separate species.

== Literature cited ==
- Anthony, H.E. 1926. Preliminary report on Ecuadorean mammals. No. 7. American Museum Novitates 240:1–6.
- Musser, G.G. and Carleton, M.D. 2005. Superfamily Muroidea. Pp. 894–1531 in Wilson, D.E. and Reeder, D.M. (eds.). Mammal Species of the World: a taxonomic and geographic reference. 3rd ed. Baltimore: The Johns Hopkins University Press, 2 vols., 2142 pp. ISBN 978-0-8018-8221-0
- Weksler, M.; Percequillo, A. R.; Voss, R. S. (2006-10-19). "Ten new genera of oryzomyine rodents (Cricetidae: Sigmodontinae)". American Museum Novitates (3537). American Museum of Natural History: 1–29. doi:10.1206/0003-0082(2006)3537[1:TNGOOR]2.0.CO;2. hdl:2246/5815. S2CID 84088556.
