= Nephelomys caracolus =

Conservation status
- Least Concern (IUCN 3.1)

Scientific classification
- Kingdom: Animalia
- Phylum: Chordata
- Class: Mammalia
- Order: Rodentia
- Family: Cricetidae
- Subfamily: Sigmodontinae
- Genus: Nephelomys
- Species: N. caracolus

Binomial name
- Nephelomys caracolus (Thomas, 1914)

Synonyms
- Oryzomys caracolus Thomas, 1914 [Nephelomys] caracolus: Weksler, Percequillo, and Voss, 2006

Species of rodent

Nephelomys caracolus, also known as the Costa Central oryzomys or caracol rice rat, is a species of rodent in the genus Nephelomys of family Cricetidae. It is found in cloud forest in the Cordillera de la Costa Central of Aragua, Miranda, and the Distrito Federal in north-central Venezuela at elevations from 1000 to 2500 m. It is nocturnal and terrestrial, and has a varied diet. In most Nephelomys species, the posterolateral palatal pits, perforations of the palate near the third molar, are conspicuous and receded into a fossa, but in N. caracolus and the Ecuadorian species N. nimbosus, the pits are much smaller.

Oldfield Thomas originally described the species, in 1914, as a member of Oryzomys, Oryzomys caracolus. From 1960 on, it was included in Oryzomys capito, the current Hylaeamys megacephalus, and subsequently in Oryzomys albigularis. In the 1990s, studies of the Venezuelan populations of the O. albigularis group, based on data from karyotypes and morphometrics, provided evidence for the distinctiveness of O. caracolus and the other Venezuelan species of the group, O. meridensis. The patterns recovered differ in details among the studies, however, and some authors chose to retain O. caracolus and O. meridensis as subspecies of O. albigularis, suggesting a need for further study on the classification of Venezuelan members of the group. When the members of the O. albigularis group were transferred to the new genus Nephelomys in 2006, caracolus was retained as a species, Nephelomys caracolus.

== Literature cited ==
- Aguilera, M. (2016). "Nephelomys caracolus". IUCN Red List of Threatened Species. 2016 e.T136833A22332280. IUCN. doi:10.2305/IUCN.UK.2016-2.RLTS.T136833A22332280.en.
- Musser, G. G.; Carleton, M. D. (2005). "Superfamily Muroidea". In Wilson, D. E.; Reeder, D. M. (eds.). Mammal Species of the World: A Taxonomic and Geographic Reference (3rd ed.). Johns Hopkins University Press. pp. 1146–1147. ISBN 978-0-8018-8221-0. OCLC 62265494.
- Weksler, M.; Percequillo, A. R.; Voss, R. S. (2006-10-19). "Ten new genera of oryzomyine rodents (Cricetidae: Sigmodontinae)". American Museum Novitates (3537). American Museum of Natural History: 1–29. doi:10.1206/0003-0082(2006)3537[1:TNGOOR]2.0.CO;2. hdl:2246/5815.
