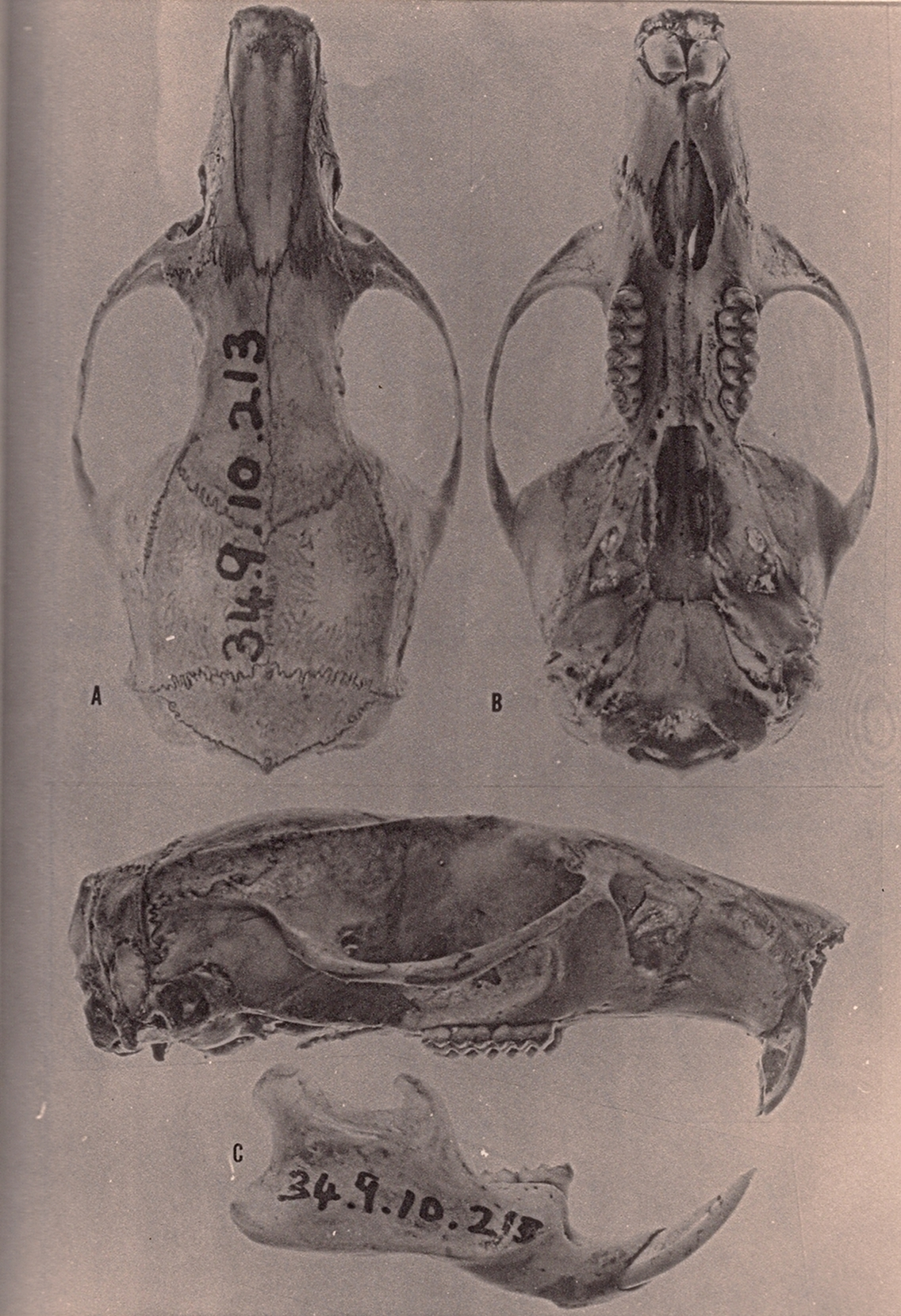
- Skull and mandible

Conservation status
- Endangered (IUCN 3.1)

Scientific classification
- Kingdom: Animalia
- Phylum: Chordata
- Class: Mammalia
- Order: Rodentia
- Family: Cricetidae
- Subfamily: Sigmodontinae
- Genus: Mindomys
- Species: M. hammondi

Binomial name
- Mindomys hammondi (Thomas, 1913)
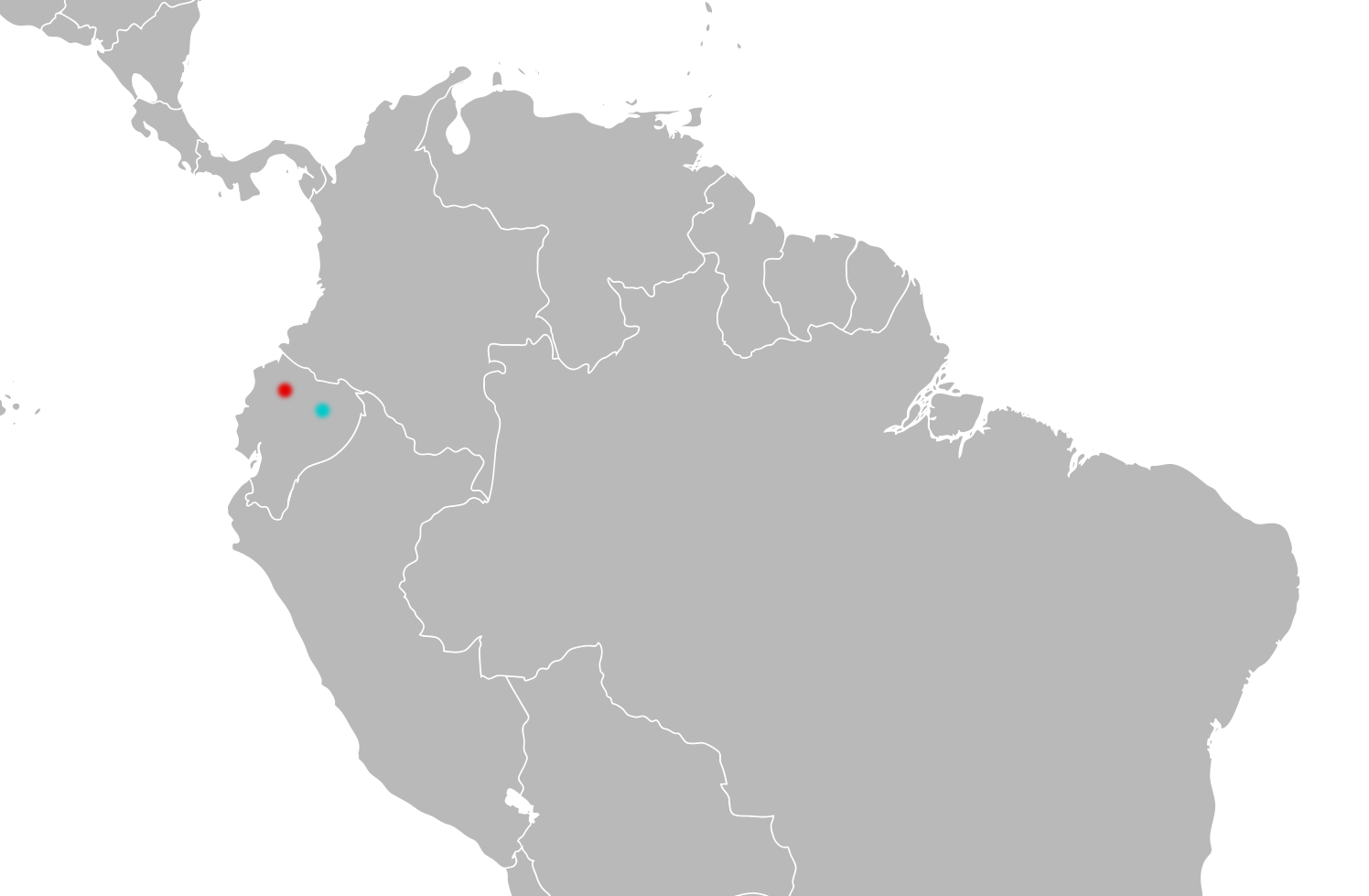
- Distribution of Mindomys: Mindo (type locality) in red; Concepción (dubious second locality) in blue.

Synonyms (Note: In this list of synonyms, new combinations (the first use of a given combination of a genus and species name) are indicated by a colon between the name combination and the authority which first used the combination. No colon is used when the name is entirely new.)
- Nectomys hammondi Thomas, 1913; O[ryzomys]. hammondi: Hershkovitz, 1948; Macruroryzomys hammondi: Steadman and Ray, 1982; [Mindomys] hammondi: Weksler, Percequillo, and Voss, 2006

= Hammond's rice rat =

Species of rodent from Ecuador

Mindomys hammondi, also known as Hammond's rice rat or Hammond's oryzomys, is an endangered species of rodent in the tribe Oryzomyini of family Cricetidae. Formerly considered to be related with Nectomys, Sigmodontomys, Megalomys, or Oryzomys, it is now placed in then genus Mindomys, but its relationships remain obscure; some evidence supports a placement near Oecomys or as a basal member of Oryzomyini.

Mindomys hammondi is known only from Ecuador, where it occurs in montane forest; a record from the Amazon basin lowlands is dubious. Reportedly, it lives on the ground and is associated with water; others suggest it lives in trees. A large, long-tailed, and long-whiskered rat, its fur is buff above and abruptly lighter below. The front part of the skull (rostrum) is heavily built.

The species is named after the collector who first found it, Gilbert Hammond. He supplied natural history specimens to Oldfield Thomas and others.

== Taxonomy ==
=== Discovery and classification in Nectomys ===
In 1913, Oldfield Thomas of the British Museum of Natural History (BMNH) in London published the first description of Mindomys hammondi, using two specimens collected at Mindo in Pichincha Province, Ecuador, in the same year by Gilbert Hammond. He named the species Nectomys hammondi, classifying it in the genus Nectomys, which at the time included not only the large water rats currently placed in it, but also Sigmodontomys alfari and Oryzomys dimidiatus. He considered the animal to be most closely related to Nectomys russulus, a species he had himself described in 1897 and which is now recognized as a synonym of Sigmodontomys alfari.

In his 1941 review The Families and Genera of Living Rodents, Sir John Ellerman retained N. hammondi as a species of Nectomys, but noted that the features of its teeth were atypical for the genus, as "the cusps appear to show no tendency to become suppressed." Reviewing the genus Nectomys in 1944, Philip Hershkovitz listed N. hammondi among species of Nectomys incertae sedis (of uncertain position), and considered its placement in Nectomys as dubious. Characters he listed as conflicting with a Nectomys identity of the species included the short hindfoot with a long fifth toe, the weakly developed posterolateral palatal pits (perforations of the palate near the third molars), and the orientation of the zygomatic plate.

=== Classification in Oryzomys ===
Hershkovitz published again on Nectomys in 1948 after examining additional material, including the holotype of N. hammondi. He now considered the latter to be a species of Oryzomys (at the time a large genus that included most of the current members of the tribe Oryzomyini), but distinctive enough to be placed in its own subgenus. Noting that the species was "extremely long-tailed", he introduced the subgeneric name Macruroryzomys for hammondi. He also wrote that Oryzomys aphrastus (currently Sigmodontomys aphrastus), then known only from Costa Rica, may be the closest relative of hammondi.

In his 1962 Ph.D. thesis, Clayton Ray considered O. hammondi to be most closely related to Megalomys, which includes giant rats from the Caribbean, and classified it as a member of the subgenus Megalomys of genus Oryzomys. In 1970, Hershkovitz treated the species in another publication and noted that his name Macruroryzomys was a nomen nudum ("naked name") because he had not explicitly mentioned characters differentiating it from other taxa in his 1948 publication. Nevertheless, he did not do anything to rectify the situation, and Macruroryzomys remains a nomen nudum. Hershkovitz rejected any relationship between O. hammondi and Nectomys or O. aphrastus and instead argued that O. hammondi was closely similar to Megalomys and may be close to the ancestor of Megalomys. In 1982, Steadman and Ray mentioned the animal in passing under the name Macruroryzomys hammondi and reaffirmed its relationship to Megalomys. In the 2005 third edition of Mammal Species of the World, Guy Musser and Michael Carleton listed O. hammondi as an Oryzomys of obscure affinities, but suggested that it may be related to Megalomys.

=== Classification in Mindomys ===
In 2006, Marcelo Weksler published a large-scale cladistic analysis of Oryzomyini ("rice rats"), the group (tribe) to which hammondi and the related species mentioned above belong. He used both morphological and molecular characters, but had only morphological data for Oryzomys hammondi. The placement of the species in his results was unstable; some trees placed it close to the tree rice rats, Oecomys, within clade B and others placed it as an isolated lineage, basal to all other Oryzomyini.

Traits of O. hammondi that supported the latter placement include: a relatively short palate that does not extend behind the maxillary bones; simple posterolateral palatal pits; absence of a capsular process (a raising of the bone of the mandible, or lower jaw, at the back end of the incisor); and presence of the posteroloph on the upper third molar (a crest at the back of the tooth). In these characters, O. hammondi differs from many or most Oryzomyini and is similar to some species outside Oryzomyini, but all traits of O. hammondi are present in at least one other member of the tribe. Traits shared by O. hammondi and Oecomys included: tail with the same coloration above and below (unicolored); parietal bones extending to the sides of the skull; narrow zygomatic plate, without a zygomatic notch; posteroloph present on upper third molar; mesoflexus (a valley in the molar crown in front of the mesoloph crest) on upper second molar not divided in two. (Note: In his 2006 paper, Weksler lists O. hammondi as having an undivided mesoflexus on the upper second molar and lists this character as a synapomorphy (shared derived trait) of the Oecomys–O. hammondi group, but later studies note that Mindomys does have a divided mesoflexus.)

In Weksler's analysis, species placed in Oryzomys did not form a coherent (monophyletic) group, but instead were found at various positions across the oryzomyine tree, and he suggested that most of these species, including O. hammondi, should be placed in new genera. Later in 2006, Weksler and others described ten new genera for species formerly placed in Oryzomys, including Mindomys for hammondi. Noting its "enigmatic distribution" and uncertain but perhaps basal position within Oryzomyini, they labeled the species an "extraordinary rat" worthy of continued inquiry. The generic name refers to Mindo, the type locality of M. hammondi.

Mindomys is now one of about 28 genera in the tribe Oryzomyini, which includes well over a hundred species distributed mainly in South America, including nearby islands such as the Galápagos Islands and some of the Antilles. Oryzomyini is one of several tribes recognized within the subfamily Sigmodontinae, which encompasses hundreds of species found across South America and into southern North America. Sigmodontinae itself is the largest subfamily of the family Cricetidae, other members of which include voles, lemmings, hamsters, and deermice, all mainly from Eurasia and North America.<

== Description ==
Mindomys hammondi is a large rice rat; all other rats known within its range are smaller. The fur is relatively short and woolly and is buffy with a grayish tone above and much paler—yellow or white—below, with the bases of the hairs grey. It has a long snout and small, dark ears that appear hairless. The vibrissae (whiskers) are long. The very long tail is dark both above and below and has rectangular scales. The hindfeet are broad, with long, narrow digits. They have poorly developed ungual tufts, patches of hair between the digits and along the plantar margins. The squamae, small structures resembling scales that cover the soles of the hindfeet in many oryzomyines, are indistinct. The fifth digit reaches to about half the length of the second phalange of the fourth. As in most oryzomyines, females have eight mammae. In specimens with published measurements, head and body length is 173 to 203 mm (6.8 to 8.0 in), tail length is 251 mm (9.9 in), hindfoot length is 41 to 42 mm (1.6 to 1.7 in), ear length is 18 mm (0.71 in), and greatest length of skull is 39.4 to 43.9 mm (1.55 to 1.73 in). (Note: Measurements are listed by Hershkovitz and Weksler. Head and body length, as given by Weksler, is based on an unknown number of specimens in the BMNH. The other four measurements are given by Hershkovitz and are of the holotype and four other specimens in the BMNH (skull and hindfoot length) or of the holotype only (tail and ear length).)

=== Skull ===
In the skull, the rostrum (front part) is large and robust. The nasal bones are short, not extending further back than the lacrimals, and the premaxillaries extend about as far back as the nasals. The zygomatic plate is narrow and lacks a zygomatic notch, an extension of the plate at the front. The plate's back margin is level with the front of the first upper molar. The narrowest part of the interorbital region, located between the eyes, is to the front and its margins exhibit strong beading. Various crests develop on the long braincase, especially in old animals. The parietal bones form part of the roof of the braincase and, unlike in some other rice rats, also extend to the sides of the braincase.

The incisive foramina, perforations of the palate between the incisors and the molars, are short, not extending between the molars. The condition of the posterolateral palatal pits is variable, with some individuals having small pits and others having larger pits that may be recessed into a fossa (depression). The palate is moderately long, extending beyond the molars but not beyond the posterior margins of the maxillary bone. In most specimens, the roof of the mesopterygoid fossa, the gap behind the back of the palate, is not perforated by sphenopalatine vacuities and thus it is fully ossified; if present, these vacuities are small. Mindomys lacks an alisphenoid strut; in some other oryzomyines, this extension of the alisphenoid bone separates two openings (foramina) in the skull, the masticatory–buccinator foramen and the foramen ovale accessorium. There are no openings in the mastoid bone. The squamosal bone lacks a suspensory process that contacts the tegmen tympani, the roof of the tympanic cavity, a defining character of oryzomyines.

In the mandible, the mental foramen, an opening in the mandible just before the first molar, opens to the outside, not upwards as in a few other oryzomyines. The upper and lower masseteric ridges, which anchor some of the chewing muscles, join at a point below the first molar and do not extend forward beyond that point. There is no capsular process of the lower incisor, a trait Mindomys shares with only a few other oryzomyines.

=== Molars ===
The molars are bunodont (with the cusps higher than the connecting crests) and brachydont (low-crowned). On the upper first and second molar, the outer and inner valleys between the cusps and crests interpenetrate. Many accessory crests are present, including the mesolophs and mesolophids. The anterocone and anteroconid, the front cusps on the upper and lower first molar, are not divided into smaller outer and inner cusps. Unlike in Nectomys, Oryzomys, and Megalomys, the first upper and lower molars usually lack accessory roots, so that each of the three upper molars has two roots on the outer side and one on the inner side and each of the lower molars has one root at the front and one at the back.

== Distribution and ecology ==
A rare species, Mindomys hammondi is known only from Ecuador. Between 1913 and 1980, eight specimens were collected at Mindo, a "tiny agricultural community" at 1,264 m (4,147 ft) elevation in Pichincha Province, northwestern Ecuador. Another specimen is labeled as having been collected on July 27, 1929, by the Olalla family of professional collectors in Concepción, a locality in the Amazon basin lowlands of Napo Province, around 300 to 500 m (980 to 1,640 ft) above sea level. If this record is correct, Mindomys would be unique among small, non-flying mammals native to Ecuador in occurring at relatively low elevations on both sides of the Andes. Furthermore, other collectors working in the same area in Napo have failed to find Mindomys, and the date the specimen was reportedly collected does not accord with the dates reported for the visit of the Olallas to Concepción, rendering its provenance dubious. There are two other locations named "Concepción" in northwestern Ecuador, and Diego Tirira suggested in 2007 that the specimen may instead be from one of these. Another specimen is known from Chaco, Imbabura Province, at an altitude of 630 m (2,070 ft).

Citing unpublished work by Tirira and Percequillo, the 2009 IUCN Red List reports that Mindomys is known from eleven specimens collected at four localities in northwestern Ecuador, and that its altitudinal range extends from 1,200 to 2,700 m (3,900 to 8,900 ft) above sea level, but does not give details. The species occurs in moist, montane forest on the foothills of the western Andes.

Almost nothing is known of the biology of Mindomys. In 1999, Eisenberg and Redford suggested that the species may live in trees; in 2007, Tirira agreed, citing the animal's broad feet. Tirira also suggested that it is nocturnal (active during the night) and solitary and eats fruits, seeds, and insects. According to the 2009 IUCN Red List, it lives on the ground and "apparently has some affinity with water".

== Conservation status ==
The IUCN Red List lists Mindomys hammondi as "endangered" in view of its small known distribution and a continuing decline in the extent and quality of its habitat. Up to 40% of its habitat may already have been destroyed, and the species was last recorded in 1980. It is not known to occur in any protected areas, but has been recorded close to the protected forest of Mindo-Nambillo. It prefers well-conserved primary forest.
