= Nephelomys pectoralis =

Scientific classification
- Domain: Eukaryota
- Kingdom: Animalia
- Phylum: Chordata
- Class: Mammalia
- Order: Rodentia
- Family: Cricetidae
- Subfamily: Sigmodontinae
- Genus: Nephelomys
- Species: N. pectoralis

Binomial name
- Nephelomys pectoralis (J.A. Allen, 1912)

Synonyms
- Oryzomys pectoralis J.A. Allen, 1912 [Nephelomys] pectoralis: Weksler, Percequillo, and Voss, 2006

Species of rodent

Nephelomys pectoralis is a species of rodent in the genus Nephelomys of family Cricetidae. Its type locality is 40 miles (64 km) west of the city of Popayán, Cauca Department, Colombia, at an altitude of 10,340 feet (3,150 m). American zoologist Joel Asaph Allen first described it in 1912 on the basis of 112 specimens from several locations in the Cordillera Occidental. He classified it as a species of Oryzomys, Oryzomys pectoralis, but later subsumed into the species Oryzomys albigularis. When that species was transferred to the new genus Nephelomys in 2006, N. pectoralis was recognized as a separate species.

N. pectoralis is larger than various other Nephelomys species, but smaller than N. maculiventer. Its upperparts are yellowish brown, and at the sides there is a distinct yellow line. Younger specimens may have some black hairs interspersed in the fur of the upperparts. The hairs of the underparts are grey at the bases and white at the tips, but those in a region of variable size on the chest are completely white. The underparts become lighter in color with age. The ears are dark brown and mostly naked. The tail is grayish brown and there is scarcely any difference in color between the upper and lower side. The hindfeet are covered with thin pale hairs. Juvenile individuals are dark brown to blackish, with the underparts dark gray in color, except for the well-defined white patch at the chest. In 41 specimens, the total length ranges from 300 to 330 millimetres (11.81 to 12.99 in), the head and body length from 136 to 166 millimetres (5.35 to 6.54 in), the hindfoot length from 33.5 to 38 millimetres (1.32 to 1.50 in), and the skull length from 34 to 37 millimetres (1.34 to 1.46 in).

== Literature cited ==
- Allen, J.A. 1912. Mammals from western Colombia. Bulletin of the American Museum of Natural History 31:71-95.
- Musser, G.G. and Carleton, M.D. 2005. Superfamily Muroidea. Pp. 894–1531 in Wilson, D.E. and Reeder, D.M. (eds.). Mammal Species of the World: a taxonomic and geographic reference. 3rd ed. Baltimore: The Johns Hopkins University Press, 2 vols., 2142 pp. ISBN 978-0-8018-8221-0
- Weksler, M.; Percequillo, A. R.; Voss, R. S. (2006-10-19). "Ten new genera of oryzomyine rodents (Cricetidae: Sigmodontinae)". American Museum Novitates (3537). American Museum of Natural History: 1–29. doi:10.1206/0003-0082(2006)3537[1:TNGOOR]2.0.CO;2. hdl:2246/5815. S2CID 84088556.
