= Nephelomys levipes =

Conservation status
- Least Concern (IUCN 3.1)

Scientific classification
- Kingdom: Animalia
- Phylum: Chordata
- Class: Mammalia
- Order: Rodentia
- Family: Cricetidae
- Subfamily: Sigmodontinae
- Genus: Nephelomys
- Species: N. levipes

Binomial name
- Nephelomys levipes (Thomas, 1902)

Synonyms
- Oryzomys levipes Thomas, 1902 [Nephelomys] levipes: Weksler, Percequillo, and Voss, 2006

Species of rodent

Nephelomys levipes, also known as the nimble-footed oryzomys or light-footed rice rat, is a species of rodent in the genus Nephelomys of family Cricetidae. It is found on the eastern slope of the Andes from southeastern Peru into west-central Bolivia in cloud forest at elevations from 1,800 to 3,200 metres (5,900 to 10,500 ft). It occurs in the same general area as its congener N. keaysi, but at higher altitudes.

In 1902, Oldfield Thomas first described this species, under the name Oryzomys levipes, on the basis of specimens from both Peru and Bolivia. He compared it to the previously described O. keaysi, the current Nephelomys keaysi, of which he considered it to be a "smaller form". In 1944, Philip Hershkovitz relegated both O. levipes and O. keaysi to the synonymy of O. albigularis, where it remained until it was reinstated a species in the early 1990s on the basis of genetic and other differences. When O. albigularis and related species were reclassified into a new genus, Nephelomys, in 2006, it was retained as a separate species, but under the name of Nephelomys levipes.

It is similar to N. keaysi, but smaller, and the fur on the underparts is buffy instead of whitish in the specimens Thomas examined. The interorbital region of the skull is narrow. The incisive foramina, which perforate the palate between the incisors and the molars, are long and narrow. The bony palate is short, with its posterior end often located between the third molars. The alisphenoid strut, an extension of the alisphenoid bone of the skull that separates two foramina (openings) in the skull, is present in some individuals. The mastoid bone usually contains some openings. In the holotype, the head and body length is 130 mm, the tail length is 160 mm, the hindfoot length (without claws) is 31 mm, the ear length is 27 mm, and the skull length is 35.7 mm.

== Literature cited ==
- Hershkovitz, P. 1944. A systematic review of the Neotropical water rats of the genus Nectomys (Cricetinae). Miscellaneous Publications Museum of Zoology, University of Michigan 58: 1–88.
- Don E. Wilson (2005). Mammal Species of the World: A Taxonomic and Geographic Reference. ISBN 978-0-8018-8221-0.
- Thomas, O. 1901. New mammals from Peru and Bolivia, with a list of those collected from the Inambari River, Upper Madre de Dios. Annals and Magazine of Natural History (7)7:178–190.
- Weksler, M.; Percequillo, A. R.; Voss, R. S. (2006-10-19). "Ten new genera of oryzomyine rodents (Cricetidae: Sigmodontinae)". American Museum Novitates (3537). American Museum of Natural History: 1–29. doi:10.1206/0003-0082(2006)3537[1:TNGOOR]2.0.CO;2. hdl:2246/5815. S2CID 84088556.
- Zeballos, H., Vargas, J. and Weksler, M. 2008. Nephelomys levipes. In IUCN. 2008 IUCN Red List of Threatened Species. Retrieved on April 24, 2009.
