= Nephelomys maculiventer =

Scientific classification
- Domain: Eukaryota
- Kingdom: Animalia
- Phylum: Chordata
- Class: Mammalia
- Order: Rodentia
- Family: Cricetidae
- Subfamily: Sigmodontinae
- Genus: Nephelomys
- Species: N. maculiventer

Binomial name
- Nephelomys maculiventer (J.A. Allen, 1899)

Synonyms
- Oryzomys maculiventer J.A. Allen, 1899 [Nephelomys] maculiventer: Weksler, Percequillo, and Voss, 2006

Species of rodent

Nephelomys maculiventer is a species of rodent in the genus Nephelomys of family Cricetidae. The type locality is in Colombia, at "Sierra El Libano, alt. 6000 ft, Santa Marta District". It was originally described on the basis of 47 specimens, including 34 from Sierra El Libano and 13 from "Valparaiso".

N. maculiventer has long and soft fur that is rufous in color on the upperparts and becomes lighter towards the sides. This coloration changes abruptly into that of the underparts, which are pure white in some adults. Juveniles are darker in color, with the underparts dark gray. As the animal matures, the gray fur of the underparts is gradually replaced by white fur. The ears are brown and nearly unhaired. The hindfeet are gray. The tail is brown above and lighter below. In 29 individuals of both sexes, the total length varies from 302 to 345 millimetres (11.89 to 13.58 in), the tail length from 162 to 194 millimetres (6.38 to 7.64 in), and the hindfoot length (including claws) from 29 to 36 millimetres (1.14 to 1.42 in). On average, males are slightly larger than females.

Joel Asaph Allen, who named the species, classified it as a member of Oryzomys, Oryzomys maculiventer, and compared it to the species now known as Nephelomys meridensis and Nephelomys albigularis. He described it as one of the largest members of Oryzomys as he understood the genus and also noted its distinctive coloration and the relatively short incisive foramina. Later, it was submerged in a broadly defined Oryzomys albigularis (currently Nephelomys albigularis), but when the genus Nephelomys was extracted from Oryzomys in 2006, N. maculiventer was reinstated as a separate species.
