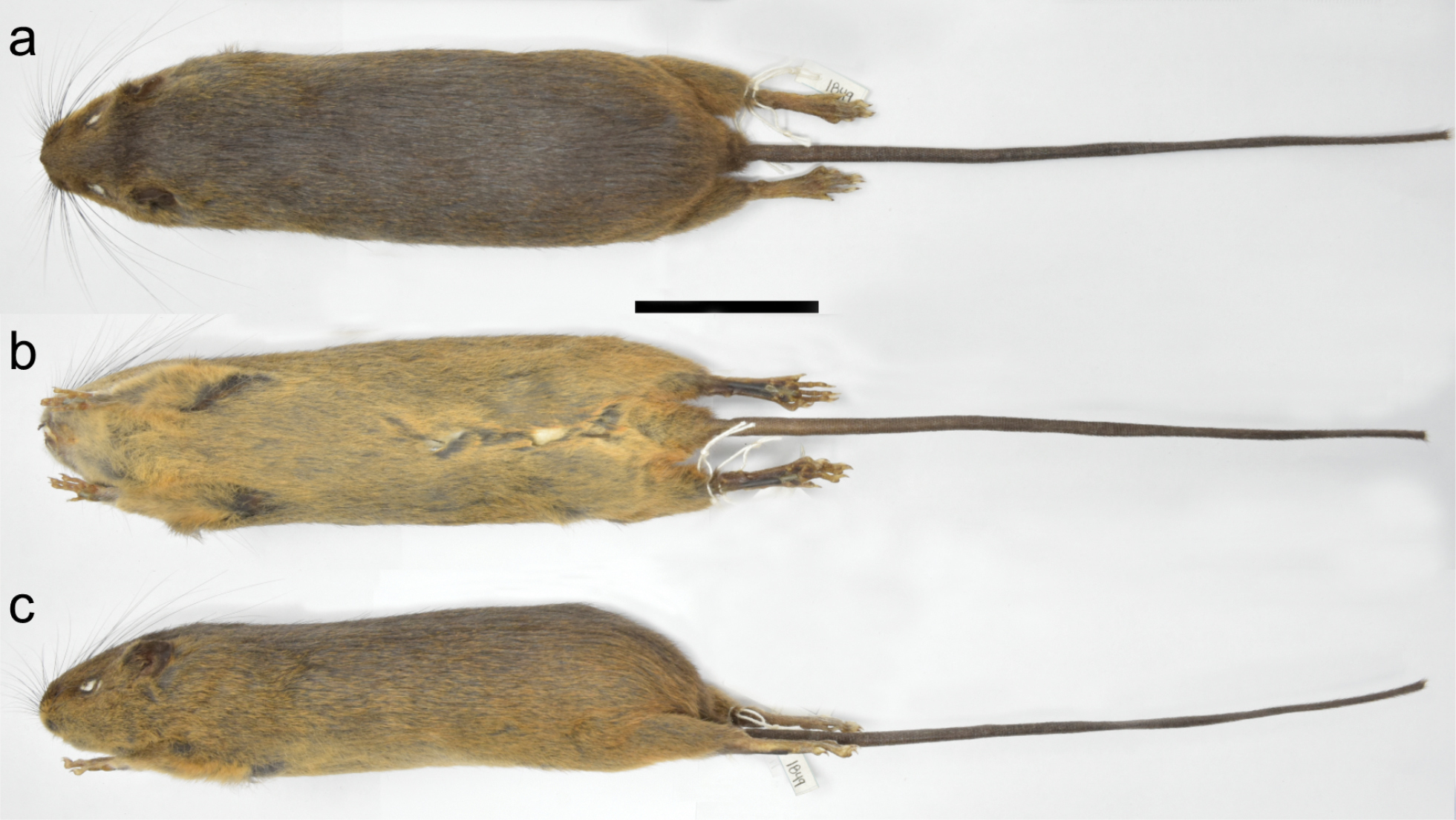

Scientific classification
- Kingdom: Animalia
- Phylum: Chordata
- Class: Mammalia
- Order: Rodentia
- Family: Cricetidae
- Subfamily: Sigmodontinae
- Genus: Mindomys
- Species: M. kutuku

Binomial name
- Mindomys kutuku Molina, Koch, Tinoco & Pardiñas, 2022

= Kutukú rat =

Species of mammal

The Kutukú rat (Mindomys kutuku) is a species of sigmodontine rodent in the tribe Oryzomyini found in the isolated Kutukú Mountains of eastern Ecuador.

== See also ==
- List of living mammal species described in the 2020s
- List of mammals of Ecuador
