= Nephelomys ricardopalmai =

Scientific classification
- Kingdom: Animalia
- Phylum: Chordata
- Class: Mammalia
- Order: Rodentia
- Family: Cricetidae
- Subfamily: Sigmodontinae
- Genus: Nephelomys
- Species: N. ricardopalmai

Binomial name
- Nephelomys ricardopalmai Ruelas & Pacheco & Inche & Tinoco 2021

Species of rodent

Nephelomys ricardopalmai is a species of rat in the genus Nephelomys. It is named after Ricardo Palma and is found in South America.

== See also ==
- List of living mammal species described in the 2020s
