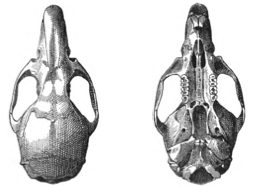
- Skull of the holotype of Nephelomys devius, a young adult female from Boquete, Panama.

Scientific classification
- Domain: Eukaryota
- Kingdom: Animalia
- Phylum: Chordata
- Class: Mammalia
- Order: Rodentia
- Family: Cricetidae
- Subfamily: Sigmodontinae
- Tribe: Oryzomyini
- Genus: Nephelomys; Weksler et al., 2006

Type species
- Hesperomys albigularis Tomes, 1860

Species
- Nephelomys albigularis; Nephelomys auriventer; Nephelomys caracolus; Nephelomys childi; Nephelomys devius; Nephelomys keaysi; Nephelomys levipes; Nephelomys maculiventer; Nephelomys meridensis; Nephelomys moerex; Nephelomys nimbosus; Nephelomys pectoralis; Nephelomys pirrensis; Nephelomys ricardopalmai

= Nephelomys =

Genus of rodents

Nephelomys is a genus of South American oryzomyine rodents found in the Andes from Bolivia to Venezuela, with a westward extension into the mountains of Costa Rica. Its generic name is derived from the Ancient Greek word nephelê "mist", referring to the cloud forest habitat of the members of the genus.

The species in this genus have historically been placed in Oryzomys, but in 2006, Brazilian zoologist Marcelo Weksler and coworkers described it as a separate genus, because it is not closely related to the type species of Oryzomys. They are most closely related to other members of clade B, including Euryoryzomys, Transandinomys, Hylaeamys, Oecomys, and Handleyomys, with some weak evidence supporting a sister-group relationship to Transandinomys. Oryzomys appears in a different part of the oryzomyine evolutionary radiation, perhaps close to Holochilus and related genera.

Nephelomys species have yellowish- to reddish-brown upperparts, and they are variable in the coloration of the underparts, with some possessing light, nearly white, fur, which is separated from the color of the upperparts by an abrupt change in color, but others having ochraceous coloring which changes more gradually from the coloring on the back. Small patches of pure white fur may also be present on the underparts in some species. The ears are small, but the tail is long, and it is bicolored to a smaller or greater extent, depending on the species. Several pads are prominently present.

Weksler and coworkers provided detailed comparisons among Euryoryzomys, Hylaeamys, Nephelomys, and Transandinomys. Among those genera, Nephelomys is unique in its short ears; in the relatively long claw on the fifth digit of the hindfoot; and in that the anterocone, the major cusp located at the front of the upper first molar, is divided into two smaller cusps. The divided anterocone appears to be a synapomorphy of the genus. Additionally, Nephelomys species are larger than those in Transandinomys and they have additional roots on the lower first molar that Transandinomys species lack.

In 1961, all current Nephelomys species were classified under the single species Oryzomys albigularis, but subsequently, the distinctiveness of various others was recognized. In 2005, seven species were listed under the O. albigularis group. When Nephelomys was described as a separate species in 2006, six former synonyms were accorded specific status, so that a total of thirteen species are now recognized as valid.

== Literature cited ==
- Bangs, O. 1902. Chiriqui Mammalia. Bulletin of the Museum of Comparative Zoology 39:15–52.
- Musser, G.G. and Carleton, M.D. 2005. Superfamily Muroidea. Pp. 894–1531 in Wilson, D.E. and Reeder, D.M. (eds.). Mammal Species of the World: a taxonomic and geographic reference. 3rd ed. Baltimore: The Johns Hopkins University Press, 2 vols., 2142 pp. ISBN 978-0-8018-8221-0
- Weksler, M. 2006. Phylogenetic relationships of oryzomyine rodents (Muroidea: Sigmodontinae): separate and combined analyses of morphological and molecular data. Bulletin of the American Museum of Natural History 296:1–149.
- Weksler, M., Percequillo, A.R. and Voss, R.S. 2006. Ten new genera of oryzomyine rodents (Cricetidae: Sigmodontinae). American Museum Novitates 3537:1–29.
