= Cerqueira's rice rat =

Scientific classification
- Kingdom: Animalia
- Phylum: Chordata
- Class: Mammalia
- Order: Rodentia
- Family: Cricetidae
- Subfamily: Sigmodontinae
- Genus: Euryoryzomys
- Species: E. cerqueirai

Binomial name
- Euryoryzomys cerqueirai Percequillo & Weksler, 2023

Species of mammal

Cerqueira's rice rat (Euryoryzomys cerqueirai) is a newly described species of rice rat that is endemic to Brazil.

== See also ==
- List of living mammal species described in the 2020s
