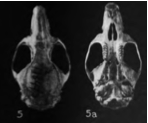
- Skull of the holotype, an adult male from Mount Pirri, Panama

Scientific classification
- Domain: Eukaryota
- Kingdom: Animalia
- Phylum: Chordata
- Class: Mammalia
- Order: Rodentia
- Family: Cricetidae
- Subfamily: Sigmodontinae
- Genus: Nephelomys
- Species: N. pirrensis

Binomial name
- Nephelomys pirrensis (Goldman, 1913)

Synonyms
- Oryzomys pirrensis Goldman, 1913 [Nephelomys] pirrensis: Weksler, Percequillo, and Voss, 2006

= Nephelomys pirrensis =

Species of rodent

Nephelomys pirrensis, also known as the Mount Pirre rice rat, is a species of rodent in the genus Nephelomys of family Cricetidae. Its type locality is at Mount Pirri or Pirre in eastern Panama, at an altitude of 4,500 feet (1,400 m), and it has also been recorded on Mount Tacarcuna.

N. pirrensis is a relatively large species. The color of the upperparts is brown and becomes lighter towards the sides. The throat is gray and the other parts of the underparts are buffy. The nose, ears, and forefeet are blackish and the thinly haired hindfeet are dark brown. The tail is dark brown above and a little paler below. Juveniles have darker fur. It is similar in size to N. devius, which occurs further west in Costa Rica, but is somewhat darker and has smaller auditory bullae. In six specimens, the total length ranges from 309 to 340 millimetres (12.17 to 13.39 in), the length of the tail vertebrae from 159 to 185 millimetres (6.26 to 7.28 in), and the hindfoot length from 34 to 38 millimetres (1.34 to 1.50 in).

It lives in holes under rocks and logs along streams. Several specimens were caught in animal runways. On Mount Tacarcuna, it occurs together with the much more common Isthmomys pirrensis, which is similar in appearance, but has longer ears and a hairier tail.

It was first described, in 1913, as a species of Oryzomys, Oryzomys pirrensis, but later synonymized under Oryzomys albigularis (currently Nephelomys albigularis). When that species was transferred to the new genus Nephelomys in 2006, N. nimbosus was recognized as a separate species.

== Literature cited ==
- Goldman, E.A. 1913. Descriptions of new mammals from Panama and Mexico. Smithsonian Miscellaneous Collections 60(22):1–20.
- Goldman, E.A. 1918. The rice rats of North America. North American Fauna 43:1–100.
- Goldman, E.A. 1920. The mammals of Panama. Smithsonian Miscellaneous Collections 69(5):1–309.
- Musser, G.G. and Carleton, M.D. 2005. Superfamily Muroidea. Pp. 894–1531 in Wilson, D.E. and Reeder, D.M. (eds.). Mammal Species of the World: a taxonomic and geographic reference. 3rd ed. Baltimore: The Johns Hopkins University Press, 2 vols., 2142 pp. ISBN 978-0-8018-8221-0
- Weksler, M.; Percequillo, A. R.; Voss, R. S. (2006-10-19). "Ten new genera of oryzomyine rodents (Cricetidae: Sigmodontinae)". American Museum Novitates (3537). American Museum of Natural History: 1–29. doi:10.1206/0003-0082(2006)3537[1:TNGOOR]2.0.CO;2. hdl:2246/5815. S2CID 84088556.
