= Nephelomys auriventer =

Conservation status
- Least Concern (IUCN 3.1)

Scientific classification
- Kingdom: Animalia
- Phylum: Chordata
- Class: Mammalia
- Order: Rodentia
- Family: Cricetidae
- Subfamily: Sigmodontinae
- Genus: Nephelomys
- Species: N. auriventer

Binomial name
- Nephelomys auriventer (Thomas, 1899)

Synonyms
- Oryzomys auriventer Thomas, 1899 [Nephelomys] auriventer: Weksler, Percequillo, and Voss, 2006

Species of rodent

Nephelomys auriventer, also known as the golden-bellied oryzomys or Ecuadorian rice rat, is a species of rodent in the genus Nephelomys of family Cricetidae. Oldfield Thomas originally described it, in 1899, as a species of Oryzomys, Oryzomys auriventer, and considered it most similar to Oryzomys aureus (currently Thomasomys aureus). In 1926, a subspecies was described from an Ecuadorian locality, Oryzomys auriventer nimbosus, and it was suggested that O. auriventer was closely related to O. albigularis. This proposal was formalized in 1961 by including O. auriventer within the species O. albigularis, but by 1976 O. auriventer was recognized again as a separate species. In 2006, Oryzomys albigularis and related species, including O. auriventer, were transferred to the new genus Nephelomys. Simultaneously, the former subspecies nimbosus was recognized as a separate species, Nephelomys nimbosus.

N. auriventer is a fairly large species, though it is somewhat smaller than the black rat (Rattus rattus). It has fine, not woolly fur which is about 10 millimetres (0.39 in) in length at the back. The upperparts are blackish, becoming lighter towards the sides. The coloration of the upperparts is sharply divided from that of the underparts, which is ochraceous. The large ears are brown. The tail is long and almost lacks hairs; it is dark brown above and slightly lighter below. The holotype, an old male, has head and body length 147 millimetres (5.79 in), tail length 160 millimetres (6.30 in), hindfoot length (without claws) 35 millimetres (1.38 in) and ear length 23 millimetres (0.91 in).

The form of the interorbital region of the skull is distinctive, featuring distinctly beaded margins that converge towards the front. Unusually for a Nephelomys, the jugal bone of the skull is large. The alisphenoid strut, an extension of the alisphenoid bone of the skull which separates two openings in the skull, is sometimes present. The subsquamosal fenestra, an opening in the posterior part of the skull, is relatively small. The mastoid bone is completely ossified, lacking the openings that are present in most species of the genus.

It is found in eastern Ecuador and northern Peru on the eastern slope of the Andes at elevations from 1000 to 2900 m. It is uncommon in Ecuador, and so far it has been found in only one locality in Peru, far to the south of its Ecuadorian range. It occurs in páramo and a variety of forest habitats.

== Literature cited ==
- Anthony, H.E. 1926. Preliminary report on Ecuadorean mammals. No. 7. American Museum Novitates 240:1–6.
- Musser, G.G. and Carleton, M.D. 2005. Superfamily Muroidea. Pp. 894–1531 in Wilson, D.E. and Reeder, D.M. (eds.). Mammal Species of the World: a taxonomic and geographic reference. 3rd ed. Baltimore: The Johns Hopkins University Press, 2 vols., 2142 pp. ISBN 978-0-8018-8221-0
- Thomas, O. 1899. Descriptions of new rodents from the Orinoco and Ecuador. Annals and Magazine of Natural History (7)4:378–382.
- Weksler, M.; Percequillo, A. R.; Voss, R. S. (2006-10-19). "Ten new genera of oryzomyine rodents (Cricetidae: Sigmodontinae)". American Museum Novitates (3537). American Museum of Natural History: 1–29. doi:10.1206/0003-0082(2006)3537[1:TNGOOR]2.0.CO;2. hdl:2246/5815. S2CID 84088556.
- Weksler, M., Tirira, D. and Boada, C. 2008. Nephelomys auriventer. In IUCN. 2008 IUCN Red List of Threatened Species. IUCN. Retrieved on November 2, 2009.
