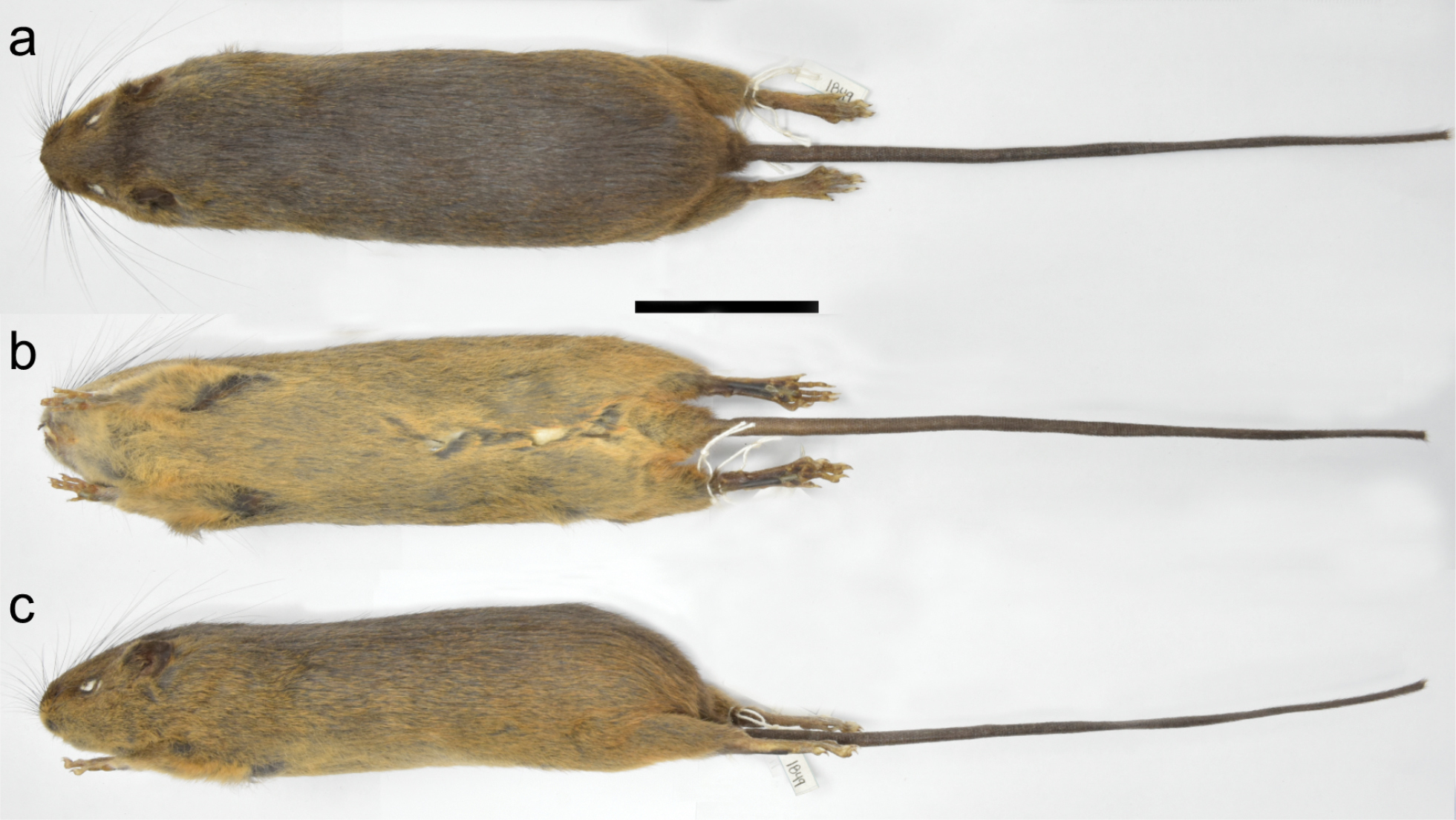
- Kutukú rat (Mindomys kutuku)

Scientific classification
- Kingdom: Animalia
- Phylum: Chordata
- Class: Mammalia
- Order: Rodentia
- Family: Cricetidae
- Subfamily: Sigmodontinae
- Tribe: Oryzomyini
- Genus: Mindomys; Weksler, Percequillo & Voss, 2006

Type species
- Mindomys hammondi (Thomas, 1913)

Species
- Mindomys hammondi; Mindomys kutuku

= Mindomys =

Genus of mammals

Mindomys is a genus of sigmodontine rodents in the family Cricetidae. It includes two species known only from Ecuador, Hammond's rice rat (Mindomys hammondi) and the Kutukú rat (Mindomys kutuku).

== See also ==
- List of mammals of Ecuador
