= Abrawayaomys chebezi =

Scientific classification
- Kingdom: Animalia
- Phylum: Chordata
- Class: Mammalia
- Order: Rodentia
- Family: Cricetidae
- Subfamily: Sigmodontinae
- Genus: Abrawayaomys
- Species: A. chebezi

Binomial name
- Abrawayaomys chebezi Teta, Palacio, Pardiñas, 2009

Species of rodent

Abrawayaomys chebezi is a species of South American rodent that is found in the Argentinian province of Misiones. Its name was given in honour of the Argentinian naturalist Juan Carlos Chébez.
