= Euryoryzomys legatus =

Conservation status
- Least Concern (IUCN 3.1)

Scientific classification
- Kingdom: Animalia
- Phylum: Chordata
- Class: Mammalia
- Order: Rodentia
- Family: Cricetidae
- Subfamily: Sigmodontinae
- Genus: Euryoryzomys
- Species: E. legatus

Binomial name
- Euryoryzomys legatus (Thomas, 1925)

Synonyms
- Oryzomys legatus Thomas, 1925 [Euryoryzomys] legatus Weksler, Percequillo, and Voss, 2006

Species of rodent

Euryoryzomys legatus, also known as the Tarija oryzomys or big-headed rice rat, is a species of rodent in the family Cricetidae. It now belongs to the genus Euryoryzomys, having previously been placed in Oryzomys. It is found in the eastern Andes of northwestern Argentina and southern Bolivia.

== Literature cited ==
- Musser, G. G. and M. D. Carleton. 2005. Superfamily Muroidea. pp. 894–1531 in Mammal Species of the World a Taxonomic and Geographic Reference. D. E. Wilson and D. M. Reeder eds. Johns Hopkins University Press, Baltimore.
- Weksler, M.; Percequillo, A. R.; Voss, R. S. (2006-10-19). "Ten new genera of oryzomyine rodents (Cricetidae: Sigmodontinae)". American Museum Novitates (3537). New York: American Museum of Natural History: 1–29. doi:10.1206/0003-0082(2006)3537[1:TNGOOR]2.0.CO;2. hdl:2246/5815. ISSN 0003-0082. S2CID 84088556.
