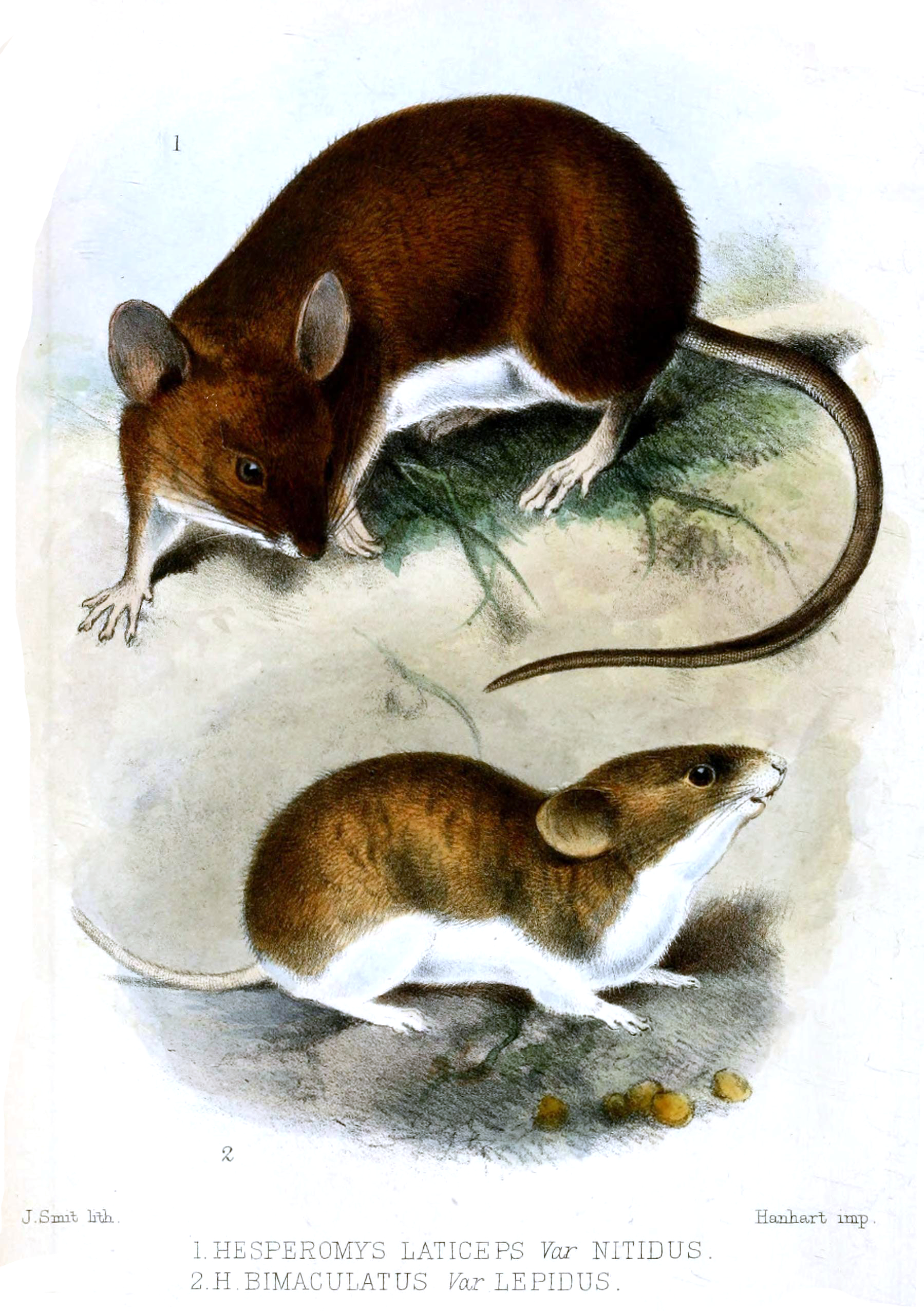
- E. nitidus (top) and Calomys laucha (bottom)

Conservation status
- Least Concern (IUCN 3.1)

Scientific classification
- Kingdom: Animalia
- Phylum: Chordata
- Class: Mammalia
- Order: Rodentia
- Family: Cricetidae
- Subfamily: Sigmodontinae
- Genus: Euryoryzomys
- Species: E. nitidus

Binomial name
- Euryoryzomys nitidus (Thomas, 1884)
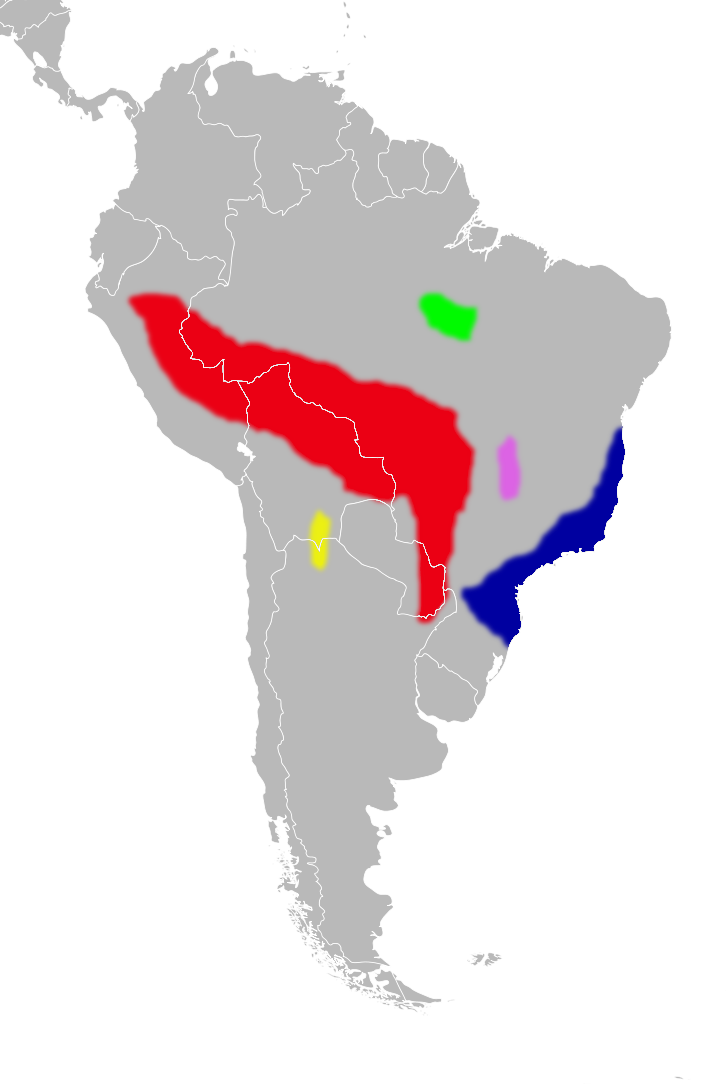
- Distribution of several Euryoryzomys species Elegant Rice Rat (Euryoryzomys nitidus)

Synonyms
- Oryzomys nitidus Thomas, 1884 [Euryoryzomys] nitidus: Weksler, Percequillo, and Voss, 2006

= Euryoryzomys nitidus =

Species of rodent

Euryoryzomys nitidus, also known as the elegant oryzomys or elegant rice rat, is a rodent species in the family Cricetidae. Previously it was known as Oryzomys nitidus, but it is not closely related to Oryzomys as that genus is now constructed. Its range includes Bolivia, Brazil and Peru to the east of the Andes, in lowland tropical rainforest as well as forest in the eastern foothills of the mountains, at elevations from 50 to 2,000 m (200 to 6,600 ft).

== Description ==
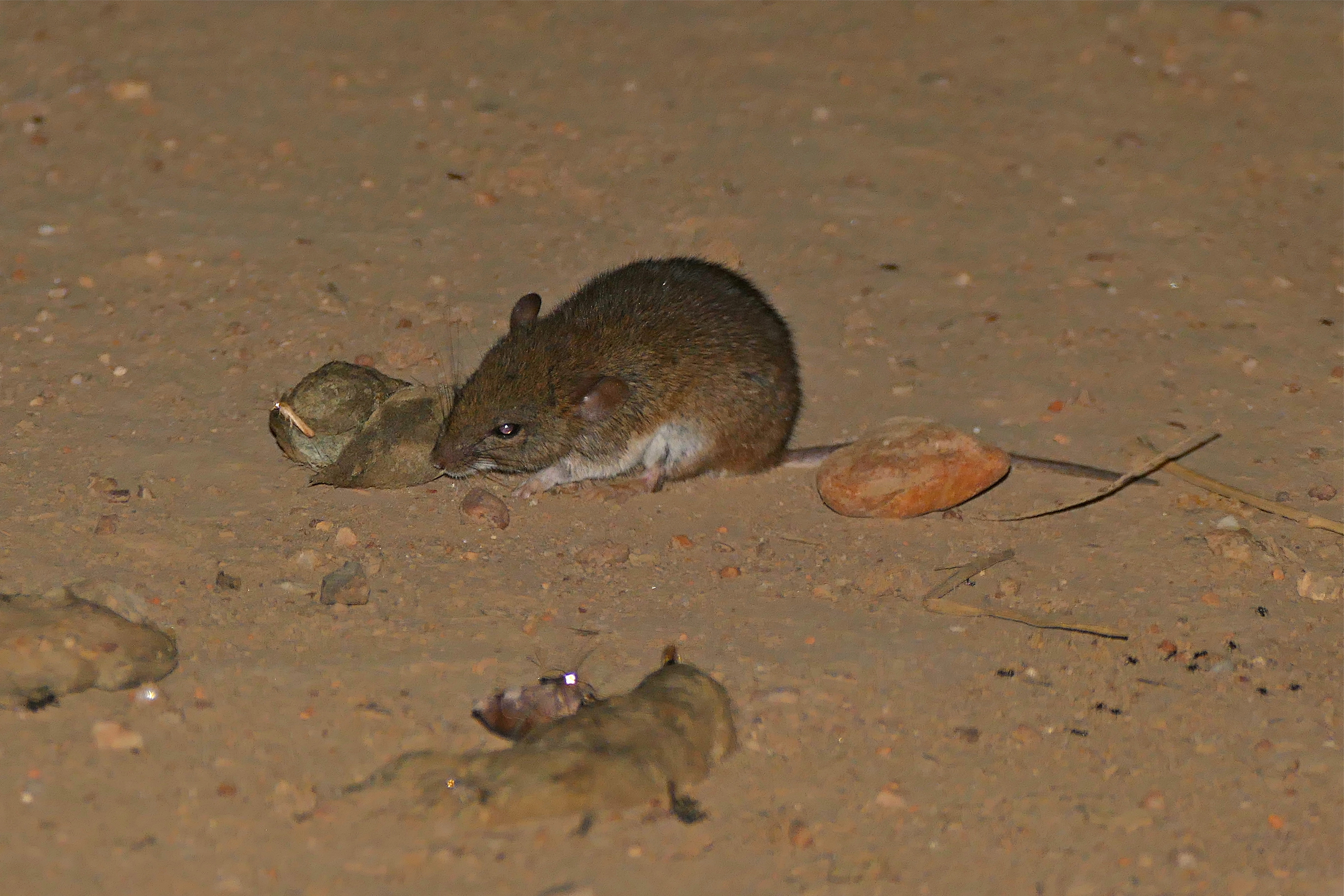
Elegant Rice Rat

Euryoryzomys nitidus is a medium-sized rice rat with a head-and-body length of about 136 mm (5.4 in) and a similar length tail. The short dense fur on the head and back is tawny or tawny-brown, the sides of the head and flanks being tinged with ochre. The underparts are whitish-grey. The tail is a uniform colour apart from the underside near the tip which is mottled. The upper surfaces of both fore- and hind-feet are clad in white hair, and the nails are hidden by tufts of hair growing between them.

== Distribution and habitat ==
The main population of E. nitidus is in the Andean foothills of Peru, Bolivia and western Brazil and adjoining lowlands. However outlying individuals have been identified at scattered locations in south-central Brazil, Paraguay and northeastern Argentina. In the upper Amazon basin, this species shares its range with the closely related Euryoryzomys macconnelli. Its altitudinal range is between about 50 and 2,000 m (200 and 6,600 ft) and its typical habitat is tropical and sub-tropical rainforest. It also occurs in secondary forest and seems able to tolerate a considerable amount of habitat degradation. Other places where it has been recovered include primary and secondary dry deciduous forests, riverine gallery forests, savannah with palm trees, swamp forests and the environs of villages, among cropland, pasture and sporting venues. It is also present in the foothills of an isolated massif in Mato Grosso do Sul on the western border of the Pantanal. It is a terrestrial species.

== Andes Hantavirus variant ==
A study of small rodents in Peru found that E. nitidus is the fourth most frequently caught species, with 35 individuals trapped out of a total of 362 rodents; six of this total harboured a hantavirus variant, IgG, including an adult male E. nitidus. Hantaviruses can cause hantavirus pulmonary syndrome in the human population, and although the occurrence of this syndrome is currently low, when it occurs, this zoonotic disease is often fatal.

== Status ==
E. nitidus is a common species with a wide distribution. It is present in a number of protected areas and no particular threats to the species have been identified. For these reasons, the International Union for Conservation of Nature has assessed its conservation status as being of "least concern".

== Literature cited ==
- Musser, G. G.; Carleton, M. D. (2005). "Superfamily Muroidea". In Wilson, D. E.; Reeder, D. M. (eds.). Mammal Species of the World: A Taxonomic and Geographic Reference (3rd ed.). Johns Hopkins University Press. p. 1152. ISBN 978-0-8018-8221-0. OCLC 62265494.
- Weksler, M.; Percequillo, A. R.; Voss, R. S. (2006-10-19). "Ten new genera of oryzomyine rodents (Cricetidae: Sigmodontinae)". American Museum Novitates (3537). American Museum of Natural History: 1–29. doi:10.1206/0003-0082(2006)3537[1:TNGOOR]2.0.CO;2. hdl:2246/5815. S2CID 84088556.
