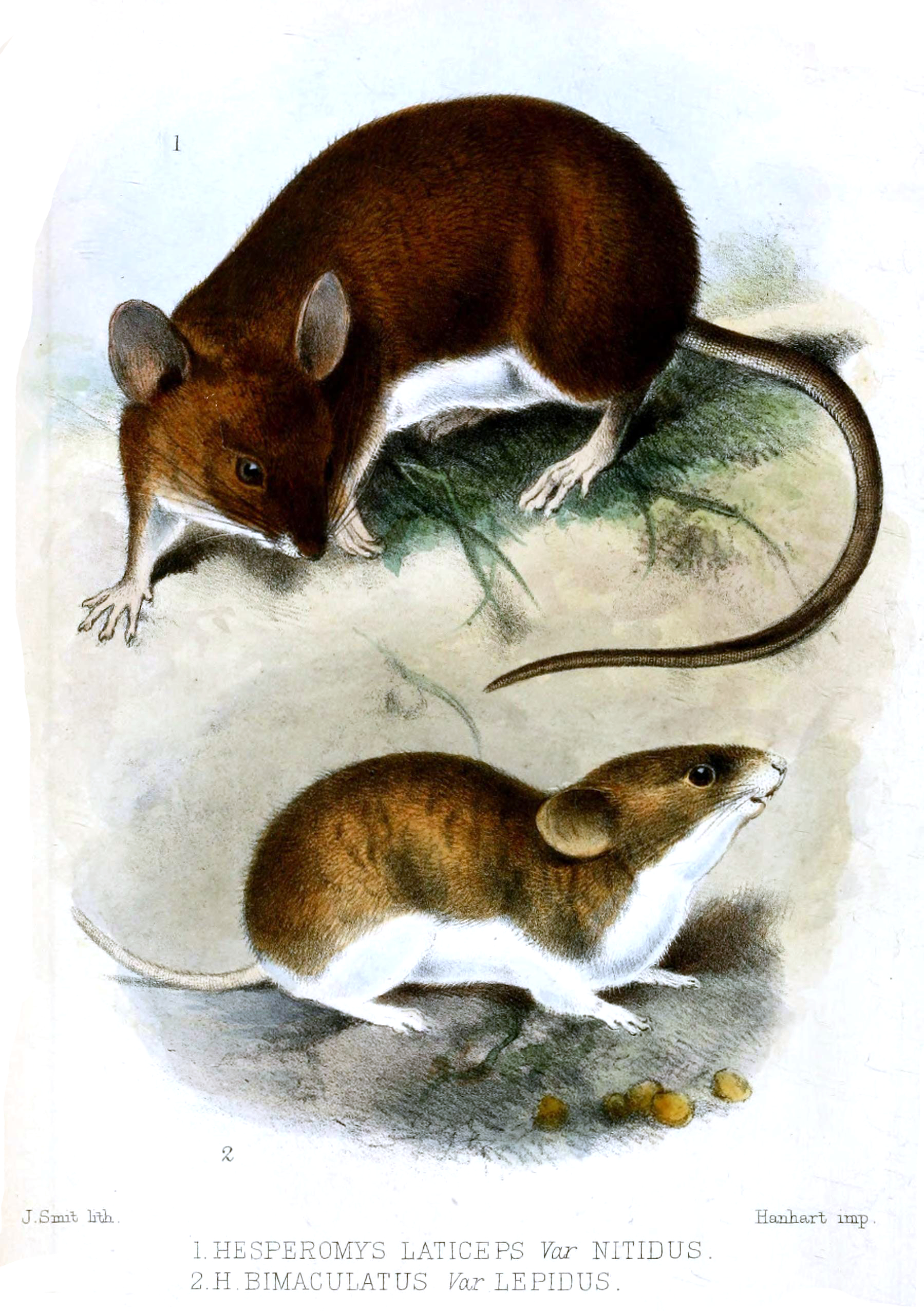
- Euryoryzomys nitidus (top) and Calomys laucha (bottom)

Scientific classification
- Domain: Eukaryota
- Kingdom: Animalia
- Phylum: Chordata
- Class: Mammalia
- Order: Rodentia
- Family: Cricetidae
- Subfamily: Sigmodontinae
- Tribe: Oryzomyini
- Genus: Euryoryzomys; Weksler et al., 2006

Type species
- Oryzomys macconnelli Thomas, 1910

= Euryoryzomys =

Genus of rodents

Euryoryzomys is a genus of rodents in the tribe Oryzomyini of family Cricetidae. It includes seven species, which are distributed in South America. Until 2006, its members were included in the genus Oryzomys, but they are not closely related to the type species of that genus, and therefore they were placed in a new genus. They are most closely related to genera like Hylaeamys and Transandinomys; many members of these genera were previously placed in a single species, known as Oryzomys capito. The genus name, Euryoryzomys, combines the name "Oryzomys" with the Ancient Greek word eurus "broad", referring to the broad range in distribution of the genus.

It includes the following species:

- Euryoryzomys emmonsae (Musser, Carleton, Brothers & Gardner, 1998)
- Euryoryzomys lamia (Thomas, 1901)
- Euryoryzomys legatus (Thomas, 1925)
- Euryoryzomys macconnelli (Thomas, 1910)
- Euryoryzomys nitidus (Thomas, 1884)
- Euryoryzomys russatus (Wagner, 1848)
- Euryoryzomys cerqueirai Percequillo & Weksler, 2023
