= Euryoryzomys lamia =

Conservation status
- Vulnerable (IUCN 3.1)

Scientific classification
- Kingdom: Animalia
- Phylum: Chordata
- Class: Mammalia
- Order: Rodentia
- Family: Cricetidae
- Subfamily: Sigmodontinae
- Genus: Euryoryzomys
- Species: E. lamia

Binomial name
- Euryoryzomys lamia (Thomas, 1901)
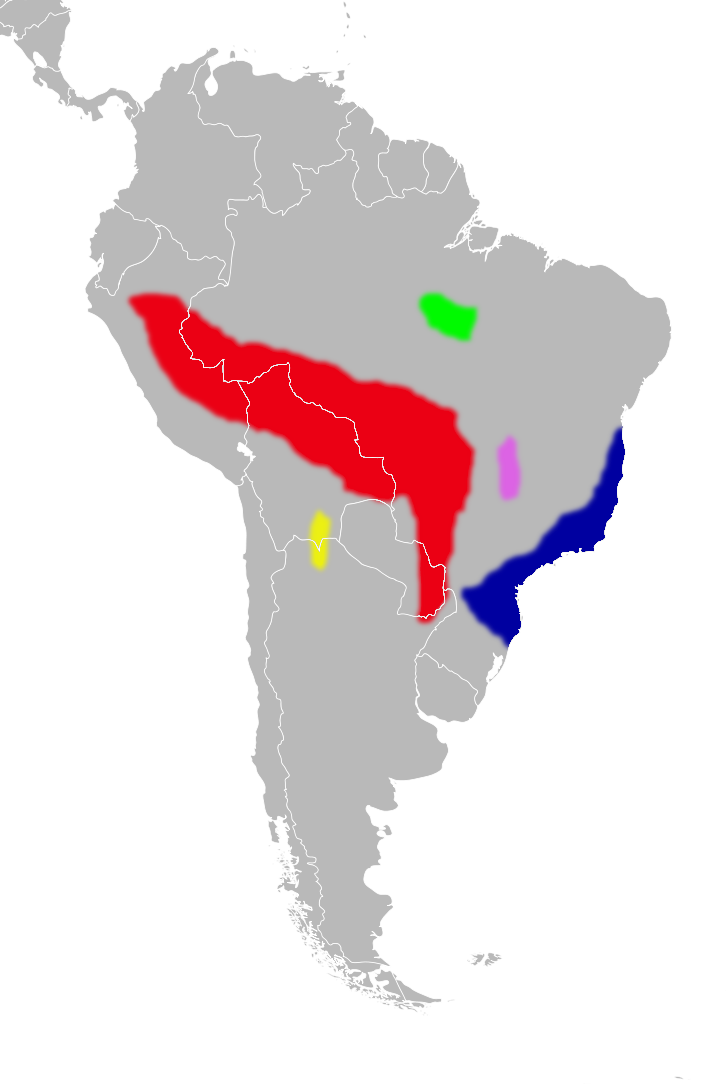
- Distribution of several Euryoryzomys species Euryoryzomys lamia

Synonyms
- Oryzomys lamia Thomas, 1901 [Euryoryzomys] lamia Weksler, Percequillo, and Voss, 2006

Species of rodent

Euryoryzomys lamia, also known as the buffy-sided oryzomys or monster rice rat, is a species of rodent in the family Cricetidae. It is found only in central Brazil, where it lives in forest enclaves within the cerrado. The species' known altitudinal range is from 700 to 900 m. The main threats to its survival are the destruction and fragmentation of its forest habitat.

== Literature cited ==
- Musser, G. G.; Carleton, M. D. (2005). "Superfamily Muroidea". In Wilson, D. E.; Reeder, D. M. (eds.). Mammal Species of the World: A Taxonomic and Geographic Reference (3rd ed.). Johns Hopkins University Press. p. 1149. ISBN 978-0-8018-8221-0. OCLC 62265494.
- Weksler, M.; Percequillo, A. R.; Voss, R. S. (2006-10-19). "Ten new genera of oryzomyine rodents (Cricetidae: Sigmodontinae)". American Museum Novitates (3537). New York: American Museum of Natural History: 1–29. doi:10.1206/0003-0082(2006)3537[1:TNGOOR]2.0.CO;2. hdl:2246/5815. ISSN 0003-0082. S2CID 84088556.
