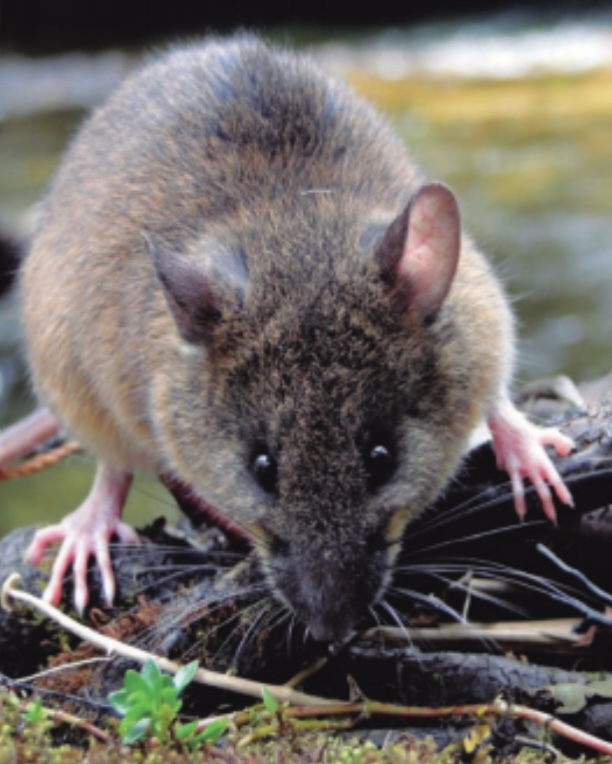

Conservation status
- Least Concern (IUCN 3.1)

Scientific classification
- Kingdom: Animalia
- Phylum: Chordata
- Class: Mammalia
- Infraclass: Placentalia
- Order: Rodentia
- Family: Cricetidae
- Subfamily: Sigmodontinae
- Genus: Nephelomys
- Species: N. albigularis

Binomial name
- Nephelomys albigularis (Tomes, 1860)

Synonyms
- Hesperomys albigularis Tomes, 1860; Oryzomys albigularis: Thomas, 1894 [Nephelomys] albigularis: Weksler, Percequillo, and Voss, 2006

= Nephelomys albigularis =

Species of rodent

Nephelomys albigularis, also known as the white-throated oryzomys or Tomes's rice rat, is a species of rodent in the genus Nephelomys of family Cricetidae. Described in 1860, it was the first Nephelomys species to be discovered. It was originally described in the defunct genus Hesperomys as Hesperomys albigularis and considered related to the much smaller H. longicaudatus (currently Oligoryzomys longicaudatus). By 1894, it was placed in Oryzomys, as Oryzomys albigularis, and associated with what is now Nephelomys meridensis. In the early 1960s, the scope of the species was considerably expanded to include most of the species that are now in Nephelomys, as well as a single name, boliviae, that is currently a synonym of Euryoryzomys nitidus. From 1976 on, several of these were reinstated as separate species.

In 2006, a phylogenetic analysis by Marcelo Weksler of the oryzomyine tribe, in which both Oryzomys and Nephelomys are classified, provided strong evidence that Oryzomys as recognized then was a polyphyletic genus. O. albigularis and one of its former synonyms, O. levipes, were included; they consistently clustered into a single group within a larger group that included species now placed in Hylaeamys, Euryoryzomys, Transandinomys, Handleyomys, and Oecomys. Accordingly, the group of species around O. albigularis was reclassified into a new genus, Nephelomys, with albigularis as its type species. Since then, the species has been known as Nephelomys albigularis. Of the seven synonyms still placed under N. albigularis in 2005, five were reclassified as separate species, N. childi, N. maculiventer, N. moerex, N. pectoralis, and N. pirrensis, one (oconnelli) was placed under N. childi, and the last (villosus) was not mentioned.

Before the other five species were recognized as separate, it was recorded as being distributed from northern Peru via the Andes of Ecuador and Colombia into eastern Panama and northwestern Venezuela. No revised distribution has been published taking into account the recognition of the other species. These have type localities in Panama, Colombia, and western Ecuador; the type locality of N. albigularis itself is also in Ecuador. It is known from montane forest at altitudes of 900 to 3300 m. It is nocturnal and omnivorous.

== Literature cited ==
- Musser, G.G. and Carleton, M.D. 2005. Superfamily Muroidea. Pp. 894–1531 in Wilson, D.E. and Reeder, D.M. (eds.). Mammal Species of the World: a taxonomic and geographic reference. 3rd ed. Baltimore: The Johns Hopkins University Press, 2 vols., 2142 pp. ISBN 978-0-8018-8221-0
- Reid, F., Samudio, R., Tirira, D., Boada, C., Weksler, M., Anderson, R.P., Rivas, B., Delgado, C. and Gómez-Laverde, M. 2008. Nephelomys albigularis. In IUCN. 2008 IUCN Red List of Threatened Species. Retrieved on April 24, 2009.
- Thomas, O. 1894. Descriptions of some new Neotropical Muridae. Annals and Magazine of Natural History (6)14:346–365.
- Tomes, R.F. 1860. Notes on a third collection of Mammalia made by Mr. Fraser in the republic of Ecuador. Proceedings of the Zoological Society of London 28:260–268.
- Weksler, M. 2006. Phylogenetic relationships of oryzomyine rodents (Muroidea: Sigmodontinae): separate and combined analyses of morphological and molecular data. Bulletin of the American Museum of Natural History 296:1–149.
- Weksler, M.; Percequillo, A. R.; Voss, R. S. (2006-10-19). "Ten new genera of oryzomyine rodents (Cricetidae: Sigmodontinae)" (PDF). American Museum Novitates (3537). American Museum of Natural History: 1–29. doi:10.1206/0003-0082(2006)3537[1:TNGOOR]2.0.CO;2. hdl:2246/5815. S2CID 84088556.
