= Nephelomys meridensis =

Conservation status
- Least Concern (IUCN 3.1)

Scientific classification
- Kingdom: Animalia
- Phylum: Chordata
- Class: Mammalia
- Order: Rodentia
- Family: Cricetidae
- Subfamily: Sigmodontinae
- Genus: Nephelomys
- Species: N. meridensis

Binomial name
- Nephelomys meridensis (Thomas, 1894)

Synonyms
- Oryzomys meridensis Thomas, 1894 [Nephelomys] meridensis: Weksler, Percequillo, and Voss, 2006

Species of rodent

Nephelomys meridensis, also known as the Mérida oryzomys, is a species of rodent in the genus Nephelomys of family Cricetidae. It is found in cloud forest in the Sierra Nevada de Mérida of western Venezuela at elevations from 1100 to 4000 m. It is solitary, nocturnal and terrestrial, and has a varied diet.

N. meridensis has thick fur, which is about 11 mm long at the back. The color of the upperparts is rufous, with brown on the head, and becomes lighter towards the sides. The coloration of the underparts, which is well demarcated from that of the upper parts, is greyish, with a pure white area at the chest. The very large ears are covered with thin dark hairs. The hand and feet, whitish in color, are sparsely haired. The tail is brown above and somewhat paler below, and is not well-furred. The incisive foramina, openings in the palate before the molars, are short. In the holotype, the head and body length is 139 millimetres (5.47 in), the tail length is 143 millimetres (5.63 in), the hindfoot length is 30.7 millimetres (1.21 in), the ear length is 21 millimetres (0.83 in), and the skull length is 34.5 millimetres (1.36 in).

It was first described in 1894 by Oldfield Thomas, who named it Oryzomys meridensis and considered it to be close to O. albigularis (currently Nephelomys albigularis) and O. velutinus (currently included in Hylaeamys megacephalus). In the next two decades, various other species were described in the group of O. albigularis and O. meridensis, which were eventually, in 1944, all consolidated under O. albigularis by Philip Hershkovitz. Because of differences in karyotype and morphology, it was reinstated as a species separate from both O. albigularis and the other Venezuelan member of the group, O. caracolus, in the 1990s. When the species of the O. albigularis group were reclassified into the new genus Nephelomys in 2006, it was retained as a species, now named Nephelomys meridensis. In Táchira, populations with a different karyotype occur, which may represent a different species.

== Literature cited ==
- Percequillo, A. (2016). "Nephelomys meridensis". IUCN Red List of Threatened Species. 2016 e.T136328A22332459. IUCN. doi:10.2305/IUCN.UK.2016-2.RLTS.T136328A22332459.en.
- Hershkovitz, P. 1944. A systematic review of the Neotropical water rats of the genus Nectomys (Cricetinae). Miscellaneous Publications Museum of Zoology, University of Michigan 58: 1–88.
- Musser, G. G.; Carleton, M. D. (2005). "Superfamily Muroidea". In Wilson, D. E.; Reeder, D. M. (eds.). Mammal Species of the World: A Taxonomic and Geographic Reference (3rd ed.). Johns Hopkins University Press. p. 1151. ISBN 978-0-8018-8221-0. OCLC 62265494.
- Thomas, O. 1894. Descriptions of some new Neotropical Muridae. Annals and Magazine of Natural History (6)14:346–365.
- Weksler, M.; Percequillo, A. R.; Voss, R. S. (2006-10-19). "Ten new genera of oryzomyine rodents (Cricetidae: Sigmodontinae)". American Museum Novitates (3537). American Museum of Natural History: 1–29. doi:10.1206/0003-0082(2006)3537[1:TNGOOR]2.0.CO;2. hdl:2246/5815. S2CID 84088556.
