= List of Cumacea literature =

Extensive literature list on Cumaceans.

== A ==
- AAAS (A.S. Pearse)., (1947). Zoological Names/ A List of/ Phyla, Classes, and Orders. Durham, North Carolina, USA.
- Abdollapour Bereya, H., K. Abbasi, A. Keyvan, & J. Sabkara., (2007). Studying Caspian shad (Alosa caspia caspia) diet in southwest coastal area of the Caspian Sea, Guilan Province waters. Iranian Scientific Fisheries Journal 16 (1): 115–128.
  - عبدالله پور بی ریا, حمید; عباسی, کیوان; کیوان, امین; سبک آرا, جلیل (2007). "بررسی رژیم غذایی ماهی پوزانوک خزری ( Alosa caspia caspia ) در سواحل استان گیلان". مجله علمی شیلات ایران. 16 (1). doi:10.22092/isfj.2007.114977.
- Abele, L., (1982). Biogeography. Pages 241–304, In: Abele, L.G. (ed.), Systematics, the Fossil Record, and Biogeography. Volume 1, In: Bliss, D.E. (ed.), The Biology of Crustacea. Academic Press, New York.
- Abookire, A.A., J.T. Duffy-Anderson, & C.M. Jump., (2007). Habitat associations and diet of young-of-the-year Pacific cod (Gadus macrocephalus) near Kodiak, Alaska.- Marine Biology 150 (4): 713–726.
- Akiyama, T., (1991). Biological rhythms synchronized with tidal cycles and seasonal modifications of their patterns.- Aquabiology 13 (4): 262–265 (in Japanese with English abstract).
- Akiyama, T., (1995). Circatidal swimming activity rhythm in a subtidal cumacean Dimorphostylis asiatica (Crustacea). Marine Biology 123: 251–255.
- Akiyama, T., (1997). Tidal adaptation of a circadian clock controlling a crustacean swimming behavior.- Zoological Science (Tokyo) 14 (6): 901–906.

Technical abstract bulletin:A periodical containing indicative and/or informative abstracts of newly published or released technical literature. The abstracts are usually arranged in subject order, and alphabetical subject and/or author indexes are provided.(TABINDA NAVEED)

- Akiyama, T., (2004). Entrainment of the circatidal swimming activity rhythm in the cumacean Dimorphostylis asiatica (Crustacea) to 12.5-hour hydrostatic pressure cycles.- Zoological Science (Tokyo) 21 (1): 29–38.
- Akiyama, T. and M. Yamamoto, (2004a). Life history of Nippoleucon hinumensis (Crustacea: Cumacea: Leuconidae) in Seto Inland Sea of Japan. I. summer diapause and molt cycle. Marine Ecology Progress Series 284: 211–225.
- Akiyama, T. and M. Yamamoto, (2004b). Life history of Nippoleucon hinumensis (Crustacea: Cumacea: Leuconidae) in Seto Inland Sea of Japan. II. Nondiapausing sub-population. Marine Ecology Progress Series 284: 227–235.
- Akiyama, T., & M. Yoshida., (1990). The nocturnal emergence activity rhythm in the cumacean Dimorphostylis asiatica (Crustacea). Biological Bulletin 179: 178–182.
- Akiyama, T., and S. Gamo., (2005). A new species of deep-sea cumacean genus Eudrella [sic] from Okinawa Trough, Northwest Pacific. Pages 261–269, In: Hasegawa, K., G. Shinohara, & M. Takeda (eds.), Deep-Sea Fauna and Pollutants in Nansei Islands. National Science Museum Monographs, No. 29.
- Akiyama, T., and S. Gamo., (2006). A new species of Eudrella [sic] (Crustacea, Cumacea) from the Seto Inland Sea, Japan. Bulletin of the National Science Museum Series A (Zoology) 32 (2): 39–46.
- Alberico N.A., Roccatagliata D., (2008). Diastylis fabrizioi, a new species and brief redescription of D. planifrons Calman, 1912 (Crustacea: Cumacea: Diastylidae) from South America. Journal of Natural History 42 (13): 1039–1063.
- Alberico, N.A., M.G. Arias, & D. Roccatagliata., (2007). On a Copepoda nicothoid parasitic on the cumacean Diastylis fabrizioi n.sp. [nomen nudum] from the southwestern Atlantic Ocean (unpublished abstract). The Crustacean Society Mid-Year Meeting, (Coquimbo, Chile, 14–17 October 2007): 69.
- Aldevig, H., (1917). Die Amphipoden, Isopoden und Cumaceen des Eisfjordd. Almqvist & Wiksell, Stockholm. Alexandrov, B., A. Boltachev, T. Kharchenko, A. Lyashenko, M. Son, P. Tsarenko, & V. Zhukinsky. 2007. Trends of aquatic alien species invasions in Ukraine. Aquatic Invasions 2 (3): 215–242.
- Alfonso, M.I., M.E. Bandera, P.J. Lopez-Gonzalez, & J.C. Garcia-Gomez., (1998). The cumacean community associated with a seaweed as a bioindicator of environmental conditions in the Algeciras Bay (Strait of Gibraltar). Cahiers de Biologie Marine 39 (2): 197–205.
- Alfonso, M.I., M.E. Bandera, P.J. López-González, & J.C. García-Gómez., (1996). Distribución espacio-temporal de los cumáceos asociados a Halopteris scoparis (L.) Sauvag. en la bahía de Algecirs. Pages 288–289, In: Resum. IX Simp. Ibér. Estud. Bent. Mar.
- Aliev, A.D., & G.M. Pyatakova., (1969). [Benthos of the eastern coast of the Middle Caspian Sea and its seasonal dynamic]. Gidrobiologicheskii Zhurnal 5 (3): 71–75.
- Aligadzhiev, G.A., (1987a). [Quantitative distribution and characteristics of the ecology of several Cumacea crustaceans from the western part of the central Caspian Sea]. Pages 31–37, In: Saidov, Y.S., & G.M. Mokhov (eds), Biologiya osnovnykh promyslovykh ryb srednego Kaspiya i sostoyanie ikh kormovoi bazy. [The biology of basic commercial fish from the central Caspian Sea and the status of their food base.] Academy of Sciences of the USSR, Makhachkala.
- Aligadzhiev, G.A., (1987b). [Quantitative distribution of some crustaceans in the western part of the middle Caspic]. Ekologiya 1987 (4): 82–84.
- Allcock, L., S. Lockharr, K. Ellingsen, R. Mooi, & C. de Broyer., (2007). Introduction to work at sea. Pages 52–55, In: Cruise Report Ant-XIX/3 and ANT-XIX/4 (ANDEEP I and II).
- Alldredge, A., & J.M. King., (1977). Distribution, abundance and substrate preferences of demersal reef zooplankton at Lizard Island Lagoon, Great Barrier Reef. Marine Biology 41: 317–333.
- Anger, K, and Valentin, C., (1976). In situ studies on the diurnal activity pattern of Diastylis rathkei (Cumacea, Crustacea) and its importance to the 'hyperbenthos'. Helgolander wiss. Meeresunters. 28: 138–144.
- Angsupanich, S., & R. Kuwabara., (1999). Distribution of macrobenthic fauna in Phawong and U-Taphao canals flowing into a lagoonal lake, Songkhla, Thailand. Lakes and Reservoirs: Research and Management 4: 1–13.
- Anokhina, L.L., (2005). Seasonal dynamics of diel changes in inshore benthopelagic communities of the Black Sea by the example of the Golumaya Bay (Gelendzhik Town). Biology Bulletin 32 (3): 288–300.
- Anokhina, L.L., (2006). Influence of moonlight on the vertical migrations of benthopelagic organisms in the near-shore area of the Black Sea. Oceanology 46 (3): 385–395.
- Antsulevich, A. E., (2005). First finding of Cumacea crustaceans in the Gulf of Finland. Vestnik Sankt-Peterburgskogo Universiteta: Seriia 3—Biologiia 1: 84–87.
- Apstein, C., (1893). Die während der Fahrt zur Untersuchung der Nordsee. Pages 191–198, In: In: Sechster Bericht der Commission zur Wissenschaftlichen Untersuchung der Deutschen Meere, in Kiel für die Jahre 1887 bis 1891. XVII. bis XXI. Jahrgang. III. Heft. Paul Parey, Berlin.
- Araújo, F.J., (1984). Hábitos alimentares de três espécies de trés bagres marinhos (Ariidae) no estuário da Lagoa dos Patos (RS), Brasil.- Atlântica 7: 47–63.
- Ariyama, Hiroyuki., (2003). Osaka-wan chubu enganiki ni okeru Makogarei chigyo no bumpu oyobi shokusei ni tsuite [Distribution and food habit of juvenile marbled sole Pleuronectes yokohamae in the middle coast of Osaka bay].- Bulletin of the Osaka Prefectural Fisheries Experimental Station, No. 14: 17–28.
- Arnaud, P.M., (1974). Contribution a la bionomie marine benthique des régions antarctiques et subantarctiques. Téthys 6 (3): 467–653 (in French with summary in English).
- Arntz, W.E., (1971a). Biomasse und produktion des Makrobenthos in den tieferen Teilen der Kieler Bucht im Jahr 1968.- Kieler Meeresforschungen 27: 36–72.
- Arntz, W.E., (1971b). Die Nahrung der Kliesche (Limanda limanda [L.]) in der Kieler Bucht. Berichte der Deutschen Wissenschaftlichen Kommission für Meeresforschung 22: 129–183.
- Arntz, W.E., (1974). Die Nahrung juveniler Dorsche (Gadus morhua L.) in der Kieler Bucht. Berichte der Deutschen Wissenschaftlichen Kommission für Meeresforschung 23: 97–120.
- Arntz, W.E., (1978a). The food of adult cod (Gadus morhua L.) in the western Baltic. Berichte der Deutschen Wissenschaftlichen Kommission für Meeresforschung 26 (1–2): 60–69.
- Arntz, W.E., (1978b). Predation on benthos by flounders, Platichthys flesus (L.) in the deeper parts of Kiel Bay. Berichte der Deutschen Wissenschaftlichen Kommission für Meeresforschung 26 (1–2): 70–78.
- Arntz, W.E., (1999). Magellan - Antarctic: Ecosystems that drifted apart. Summary Review. Scientia Marina 63 (Supplement 1): 503–511.
- Arroyo, N.L., M. Maldonado, R. Pérez-Portela, & J. Benito., (2004). Distribution patterns of meiofauna associated with a sublittoral Laminaria bed in the Cantabrian Sea (north-eastern Atlantic). Marine Biology 144: 231–242.
- Audouin, M.V., (1829). Deuxieme partie. Crustaces. Pages 24–49, In: Histoire naturelle des Annélides, Crustacés, Arachnides et Myriapodes, contenant l´esquisse de l´organisation, des caractéres, des mœrs et de la description de ces animaux; précédée d´une introduction historique, et suivie d´une biographie, d´une bibliographie et d´un vocabulaire. Bureau de l´Encyclopédie Portative, Paris.

== B ==
- Baan, S.M. van der, & L.B. Holthuis., (1972). Short note on the occurrence of Cumacea in the surface plankton collected at the "Texel" lightship in the southern North Sea. Zoologische Bijdragen 13: 71–74.
- Bacescu, M., (1940). Les Mysidacés des eaux roumaines. Etude morphologique, taxonomique et bio-économique. Annales Scientifiques de l´Université de Jassy. 2. Ptie., Sciences Naturelles 26 (2): 453–804 (4 plates).
- Bacescu, M., (1942). Observatii biologice si faunistice în legatura cu Balta Greaca. Revista St. 'Adamachi' Iasi 28: 151–154.
- Bacescu, M., (1949). Données sur la faune carcinologique de la Mer Noire le long de la côte Bulgare. Travaux Station Biologique Maritine de Varna (Bulgarie) 14 (1948): 1–24 (in French).
- Bacescu, M., (1950a). Cumacei Mediteraneeni modification de mediul Pontic. Analele Academiei Republicii Populare Române 3 (2): 453–457.
- Bacescu, M., (1950b). Speciile de Iphinoe (Crustacei Cumacei) din Marea Neagra- Cu un studiu special asupra lui Iphinoe maeotica (Sov.) si descrierea unei noi specii Iphinoe elisae n.sp. Analele Academiei Republicii Populare Romane Seria:Geologie, Geografi, Biologie, Stiinte Tehnice si Agricole 3 (12): 461–515 (in Romanian with summaries in Russian and French).
- Bacescu, M., (1950c). Capturi de Cumacei facute in apele Românesti si studiui, a doua forme mai aparte; Bodotria arenosa mediterranea (Steuer) si Schizorhynchus scabriusculus danubialis n.f.- Lucrarile Sesiunii Generale Stiintifice 1950:742–755 (in Romanian with summaries in French and Russian).
- Bacescu, M., (1951a). Cumacea. Republicii Populare Române, Academia Republicii Populare Române 4 (1): 5–91.
- Bacescu, M., (1951b). Nannastacus euxinicus n. sp., Cumaceu nou gasit în apele marii negre. Comunicarile Academiei R.P.R 1 (7): 585–592.
- Bacescu, M., (1954). Mysidacea. Pages 1–126, In: Fauna Republicii Populare Romîne, Crustacea, IV (3). Academia Republicii Populare Romîne, Bucuresti.
- Bacescu, M., (1956). Cumopsis fagei n. sp., Cumacé nouveau, provenant des eaux du littoral Francais de la manche. Vie et Milieu 7 (3): 357–365.
- Bacescu, M., (1960a). Cîteva animale necunoscute înca în Marea Neagra si descrierea unor Malacostracei noi (Elaphognathia monodi n.sp. si Pontotanais borceai n.g. n.sp.), provenind din apele pontice prebosforice. Academia Republicii Populare Romîne, Studii si Cercetari de Biologie seria Biologie Animala 12: 107–124 (in Romanian). [Note:Bacescu, 1960b and Bacescu, 1960c are Russian and French versions of this article, respectively.]
- Bacescu, M., (1960b). Quelques animaux encore inconnus dans la Mer Noire; description de deux Malacostracés nouveaux Elaphognathia monodi n. sp., et Pontotanais borceai n. g., n. sp. provenant des eaux pontiques proches du Bosphore. Revue de Biologie 5: 233–248. [Note:this is the French version of Bacescu, 1960a.]
- Bacescu, M., (1960c). Novye vidy vyssich rakov, obnaruzennye v pribosforskich vodach cernogo morya.- Revue de Biologie 5:233–248. [Note:This is the Russian version of Bacescu, 1960a.]
- Bacescu, M., (1961a). Deux espèces nouvelles de Makrokylindrus sous-genre Vemakylindrus n. sp. (Crustacés, Cumacés) des eaux tropicales du Pacifique (Côte Américani). Academie de la Republique Populaire Romane 6 (3): 326–333.
- Bacescu, M., (1961b). Contribution a l'étude des Cumacés de la Méditerranée et particulièrement des côtes d'Israël. Rapports et Procès-verbaux des réunions de la C.I.E.S.M.M 16: 496–502.
- Bacescu, M., (1962). Contribution a la connaissance du Genre Makrokylindrus Stebbing (Crustacea, Cumacea). Abyssal Crustacea 1: 210–222.
- Bacescu, M., (1963). Contribution a la biocoenologie de la Mer Noire l´étage périazoïque et le faciès dreissenifère leurs caractéristiques. Rapports et Procès-Verbaux Commission Internationale Pour l´ Exploration Scientifique de la Mer Méditerranée 17 (2): 107–122.
- Bacescu, M., (1965). Bibliographie Roumaine de la Mer Noire. Commission Nationale de la République Populaire Roumaine Pour l´Unesco, Bucarest.
- Bacescu, M., (1969a). Deux Cumacés nouveaux: Diastyloides carpinei n. sp. dans la Méditerranée et Hemilamprops lotusae dans l'Atlantique Argentin. Revue Roumaine de Biologie, Academia Republicii Socialiste Romania 164–171.
- Bacescu, M., (1969b). Cumacea Kroyer, 1846. Pages 381–402, In: Mordukhai-Boltovskoi (ed.), Opredelitel' fauny Chernogo i Azovskogo Morei [Identification key to the fauna of the Black and Azov Seas]. Vol. 2. Free-living invertebrates; Crustacea. Akad. Nauk USSR, "Naukova Dumka", Kiev.
- Bacescu, M., (1971). Cumacea from the littoral waters of Florida (Caribbean Sea). Travaux du Muséum d'Histoire Naturelle Grigore Antipa 11: 7–23.
- Bacescu, M., (1972a). Cumella africana n. sp. and Makrokylindrus (Coalescuma) reyssi n. sp. (Cumacea, Crustacea) from the Saharan bottom of the Atlantic. Revue Roumaine de Biologie, Academia Republicii Socialiste Romania 17 (143–151).
- Bacescu, M., (1972b). Archaeocuma and Schizocuma, new genera of Cumacea from the American tropical waters. Revue Roumaine de Biologie, Academia Republicii Socialiste Romania 17: 241–250.
- Bacescu, M., (1972c). 7. Substratum 7.3 Animals. Pages 1291–1322, In: Kinne, O. (ed.), Marine Ecology, Vol. 1 (3) Environmental Factors. Wiley-Interscience.
- Bacescu, M., (1973). Bibliographia Cumanceorum. Cecetari Marine, I.R.C.M. 5,6: 226–261.
- Bacescu, M., (1975). Archaic species of Tanaidacea from the Tanzanian waters with the description of a new genus, Tanzanapseudes. Revue Roumaine de Biologie (Série de Zoologie), Bucarest 20: 81–91.
- Bacescu, M., (1976). Three new genera and six new species of Monokonophora (Crustacea, Tanaidacea) from the coral reefs of Tanzania. University Science Journal (University of Dar es Salaam) 2 (1): 3–24.
- Bacescu, M., (1978). Contribution to the knowledge of Monokonophora (Crustacea:Tanaidacea) from the NW of the Indian Ocean. Memoires Sectiunea de Stiintifice, Academie de Roumaine 4: 197–220.
- Bacescu, M., (1979). Heteroleucon heardi n. sp. from the Mexican Gulf. Revue Roumaine de Biologie, Academia Republicii Socialiste Romania 24: 95–97.
- Bacescu, M., (1980a). Apseudes bermudeus, n. sp. from caves around Bermude Islands. Acta Adriatica 21: 401–407.
- Bacescu, M., (1980b). Contributions to the knowledge of some Kalliapseudidae (Crustacea, Tanaidacea) from the NW of the Indian Ocean. Travaux du Muséum National d´Histoire naturelle "Grigore Antipa" 22 (2): 359–379.
- Bacescu, M., (1982a). Contributions a la connaissance de cumacés de la mer de Marmara et d'Égée (Ile Eubea). Travaux du Muséum d'Histoire Naturelle Grigore Antipa 24: 45–54.
- Bacescu, M., (1982b). Contribution a l'étude des Cumacés de la Méditerranée et particulièrement des côtes d'Israël. Rapports et Procès-verbaux des réunions de la C.I.E.S.M.M. 16 (2): 495–501.
- Bacescu, M., (1988). Cumacea I (Fam. Archaeocumatidae, Lampropidae, Bodotriidae, Leuconidae). The Hague, Academic Publishing.
- Bacescu, M., (1990). New Cumacea from Northern Australian waters. Beaufortia 41 (2): 9–13.
- Bacescu, M., (1991a). Campylaspis wardi n. sp. and Gynodiastylis nordaustraliana n. sp. from the littoral waters of Northern Australia. Travaux du Muséum d'Histoire Naturelle Grigore Antipa 31: 317–322.
- Bacescu, M., (1991b). Sous-marines des Bermudes. Revue Roumaine de Biologie, Academia Republicii Socialiste Romania 36: 1–5.
- Bacescu, M., (1992a). Cumacea II: Families Nannastacidae, Diastylidae, Pseudocumatidae, Gynodiastylidae et Ceratocumatidae. The Hague, Academic Publishing.
- Bacescu, M., (1992b). Sur quelques Cyclaspis (Crustacea, Cumacea) des eaux nw d'Australie. Travaux du Muséum d'Histoire Naturelle Grigore Antipa 32: 251–256.
- Bacescu, M., (1992c). Deux espèces nouvelles de Cumella (Crustacea, Cumacea) des grottes sous-marines de Bermuda. Travaux du Muséum d'Histoire Naturelle Grigore Antipa 32: 257–262.
- Bacescu, M., (1994). The list of taxa described by Mihai Bacescu. Travaux du Muséum d'Histoire Naturelle Grigore Antipa 34: 611–615.
- Bacescu, M., & A. Carausu., (1947). Apseudopsis ostroumovi n.sp. dans la Mer Noire (morphologie, affinités phylogénètiques, écologie). Bulletin de la Section Scientifique, Académie Roumaine 29:366–383.
- Bacescu, M. and L. B. Holthuis, (1988a). Iphinoe Bate, 1856 (Crustacea, Cumacea): proposed conservation. Bulletin of Zoological Nomenclature 45(4): 267–269.
- Bacescu, M. and L. B. Holthuis, (1988b). Bodotria Goodsir, 1843 (Crustacea, Cumacea): proposed conservation. Bulletin of Zoological Nomenclature 45 (4): 264–266.
- Bacescu, M. and L. B. Holthuis, (1988c). Leucon Krøyer, 1846 (Crustacea, Cumacea): proposed conservation. Bulletin of Zoological Nomenclature 45 (4): 270–271.
- Bacescu, M., & T. Iliffe., (1991). Nouvelles espèces de Cumella des grottes sous-marines de Bermude. Revue Roumaine de Biologie. Serie de Biologie Animale 36 (1–2): 9–13.
- Bacescu, M. and E. Lima De Quieroz, (1985). The contribution of Cumacea in the feeding of the Rajidae Sympterigia acuta and S. bonaparti from Rio Grande do Sul- S. Brazil. Travaux du Muséum d'Histoire Naturelle Grigore Antipa 27: 9–18.
- Bacescu, M., & C. Margineanu., (1959). Éléments méditerranéens nouveaux dans la faune de la Mer Noire, rencontrés dans les eaux de Roumélie (Nord-Ouest-Bosphore). Données nouvelles sur le problème du peuplement actuel de la Mer Noire. Archivio di Oceanografia e Limnologia 11 (Supplement): 63–74.
- Bacescu, M., & F. Mayer., (1960). Nouveaux cas de commensalisme (Colomastrix et Tritaeta) et de parasitieme (Rhizorhina) pour la Mer Noire et quelques observations sur l´Ampelisca des eaux prébosphoriques. Travaux du Muséum National d´Histoire naturelle "Grigore Antipa" 2: 87–96.
- Bacescu, M. and Z. Muradian, (1972a). Trois espèces nouvelles de Procampylaspis (Cumacea) des eaux de la Mauritanie (Atlantique Tropical de l'est). Revue Roumaine de Biologie, Academia Republicii Socialiste Romania 17 (3–13).
- Bacescu, M. and Z. Muradian, (1972b). Nouvelles espèces de Nannastacidae (Crustacés, Cumacés) dans les eaux Sahariennes de l'Atlantique. Rev. Trav. Inst. Pêches Marit 36 (3): 255–269.
- Bacescu, M., & Z. Muradian., (1973). Contributions à la connaissance des Cumacés de la mer Rouge. Rapports et Procès- Verbaux des Réunions 22 (4): 83.
- Bacescu, M. and Z. Muradian, (1974a). Floridocuma selvakumarani gen. nov., sp. nov. and Bathycumella est-Africana gen. nov., sp. nov.- new Nannastacidae (Cumacea) from over 200 m depth. Travaux du Muséum d'Histoire Naturelle Grigore Antipa: 103–110.
- Bacescu, M. and Z. Muradian, (1974b). Campylaspenis, Styloptocuma, Atlantocuma, new genera of Cumacea from the deep waters of the Atlantic. Revue Roumaine de Biologie, Academia Republicii Socialiste Romania 19 (2): 71–79.
- Bacescu, M. and Z. Muradian, (1974c). New Cumacea from the North-Western Atlantic: Ceratocuma panamensis n. sp., Cimmerius costlowi n. sp. and some comments upon Petalosarsia declivis (G. O. Sars). Revue Roumaine de Biologie, Academia Republicii Socialiste Romania 19: 217–227.
- Bacescu, M. and Z. Muradian, (1975). New Cumacea from the Red Sea. Travaux du Muséum d'Histoire Naturelle Grigore Antipa: 35–69.
- Bacescu, M. and Z. Muradian, (1976). Bathylamprops motasi, sp. n. from the West Atlantic and some considerations on the genus. Studii si Cominicari, Muzeul de Stiintele Naturii Bacau: 15–19.
- Bacescu, M. and Z. Muradian, (1977a). Species of the Genus Cumella (Cumacea, Nannastacidae) from the Western tropical Atlantic. Travaux du Muséum d'Histoire Naturelle Grigore Antipa 18: 89–101.
- Bacescu, M. and Z. Muradian, (1977b). Cubanocuma gutzui gen. et. sp. n. (Cumacea, Nannastacidae) from the tropical Western Atlantic. Revue Roumaine de Biologie, Academia Republicii Socialiste Romania 22 (1): 3–9.
- Bacescu, M., & Z. Muradian., (1977c). Contribution a la connaissance des Peracarides des eaux du nord-est de Libye. Rapports et Procès-Verbaux des Réunions (International Commission for the Scientific Exploration of the Mediterranean Sea) N.S., 24(4): 111–112.
- Bacescu, M. and Z. Muradian, (1978). Fontainella mediterranea gen. n., sp. n., Cumacé (Pseudocumatidae) trouvé en Méditerranée orientale. Revue Roumaine de Biologie, Academia Republicii Socialiste Romania 23: 3–7.
- Bacescu, M., & M. Ortiz., (1984). Contribution to the knowledge of the Mysidacea (Crustacea) of the Cuban insular shelf waters. Travaux du Muséum d´Histoire Naturelle "Grigore Antipa" 24: 15–23.
- Bacescu, M., & I. Petrescu., (1989). Contribution to the knowledge of the Campylaspis species (Crustacea, Cumacea) from the southern littoral waters of Brazil. Revue Roumaine de Biologie. Série de Biologie Animale 34 (2): 65–71.
- Bacescu, M. and I. Petrescu, (1991). New Cumacea (Crustacea, Peracarida) from the littoral waters of Brazil. Travaux du Muséum d'Histoire Naturelle Grigore Antipa 31: 327–340.
- Bacescu, M. and I. Petrescu, (1999). Traite de Zoologie, Anatomie, Systématique, Biologie. Mémoires de l'Institut Océanographique Monaco. P.-P. Grasse. Paris, Masson. 7, Fascicule IIIA.
- Bacescu, M., E. Dumitrescu, A. Marcus, G. Paladian, & R. Mayer., (1963). Données quantitatives sur la faune pétricole de la Mer Noire à Agigea (secteur Roumain), dans les conditions spéciales de l´année 1961. Travaux du Muséum National d´Histoire Naturelle "Grigore Antipa" 4: 131–155.
- Bacescu, M., G.I. Müller, & M.T. Gomoiu., (1971). Analiza cantitativa, calitativa si comparativa a faunei bentale pontice. Ecologie Marina 4: 1–357.
- Bacescu, M., H. Dumitrescu, V. Manea, F. Pór, & R. Mayer., (1957). Les sables a Corbulomya (Aloidis) maeotica Mil. base trophique de premier ordre pour les poissons de la Mer Noire. Aspect hivernal de la biocénose à Corbulomya des eaux roumaines. Travaux du Muséum National d´Histoire naturelle "Grigore Antipa" 1: 305–374.
- Bacescu, M., M.T. Gomoiu, N. Bodeanu, A. Petran, & G. Müller, & V. Manea., (1965). Studii asupra variatiei vietii marine in zona litorala nisipoasa la nord de Constanta. Ecologie Marina 1:5–139.
- Bacescu, M., M.T. Gomoiu, N. Bodeanu, A. Petran, G. Müller, & S. Stanescu., (1965). Recherches écologiques sur les fonds sablonneux de la Mer Noire (côte Roumaine). Travaux du Muséum d´Histoire Naturelle "Grigore Antipa" 5: 33–81.
- Bacescu-Mester, L., (1967). Contribution to the knowledge of the Genus Leptostylis Sars (Cumacea): three new species collected by the Vema expedition. Crustaceana 13 (18): 266–274.
- Bachmann, A.O., & A. Moguilevsky., (1973). Sobre la presencia de crustaceos cumaceos Nanastacidae en la Ribiera Argentina del Rio de la Plata. Physis, Section B, 32 (84): 139–140.
- Bachmayer F., (1960). Eine fossile Cumaceenart (Crustacea:Malacostraca) aus dem Callovien von La Voulte-sur-Rhone (Ardéche). Eclogae Geologicae Helvetiae 53: 422–426.
- Bailey, K., & J. Dunn., (1979). Spring and summer food of walleye pollock, Theragra chalcogramma, in the eastern Bering Sea. Fishery Bulletin 77 (1): 304–308.
- Baker, C.F., (1912). Notes on the Crustacea of Laguna Beach. Annual Report of the Laguna Marine Laboratory 1: 100–117.
- Bakir, K., & T. Katagan., (2005). Crustacean diversity of the coralligenous beds of Markiz Island (Aegean coast of Turkey). Crustaceana 78 (7): 873–883.
- Baldinger, A.J., (1999). The crustacean collection at the Museum of Comparative Zoology, Harvard University. Pages 45–59, In: Schram, F.R., & J.C. von Vaupel Klein (eds.), Crustaceans and The Biodiversity Crisis:Proceedings of the Fourth International Crustacean Congress, Amsterdam, the Netherlands, July 20–24, 1998, volume I. Koninklijke Brill NV, Leiden, Netherlands.
- Bally, R., (1983). Intertidal zonation on sandy beaches of the west coast of South Africa. Cahiers de Biologie Marine 24 (1): 85–103.
- Bamber, R.N., (1989). The marine fauna of the Sizewell area 2. The sublittoral benthos and 3. Sizewell Beach. National Power Research Report ESTD L R No. 119 1989:1–13.
- Bamber, R.N., (2005). The tanaidaceans (Arthropoda:Crustacea:Peracarida:Tanaidacea) of Esperance, Western Australia, Australia. Pages 613–728, In: Wells, F.E., D.I. Walker, & G.A. Kendrick (eds.), The Marine Flora and Fauna of Esperance, Western Australia. Western Australian Museum, Perth.
- Barber, S.B., (1961). Chemoreception and Thermoreception. Pages 109–132, In: Waterman, T.H. (ed.), The Physiology of Crustacea, Volume 2. Sense Organs, Integration and Behavior. Academic Press, New York.
- Barnard, J.L., (1970). Benthic ecology of Bahia de San Quintin, Baja California. Smithsonian Contributions to Zoology 44: 1–60.
- Barnard, J. and R. Given, (1961). Morphology and ecology of some sublittoral cumacean Crustacea of Southern California. Pacific Naturalist 2: 153–165.
- Barnard, J., R. Menzies, et al., (1962). Abyssal Crustacea. New York and London, Columbia University Press.
- Barnes, R.S.K., (1994). The Brackish-Water Fauna of Northwestern Europe: an Identification Guide to Brackish-Water Habitats, Ecology and Macrofauna for Field Workers, Naturalists and Students. Cambridge University Press, New York.
- Barrera-Oro, E.R., & G.L.M. Piacentino., (2007). Feeding habits of juvenile Trematomus newnesi (Pisces, Nototheniidae) at Potter Cove, South Shetland Islands, Antarctica. Polar Biology 30: 789–796.
- Bartulovic, V., D. Lucic, A. Conides, B. Glamuzina, J. Dulcic, D. Hafners, & M. Batistic., (2004). Food of sand smelt, Atherina boyeri Risso, 1810 (Pisces:Atherinidae) in the estuary of the Mala Neretva River (middle-eastern Adriatic, Croatia). Scientia Marina 68 (4): 597–603.
- Barysheva, K.P., (1965). K faune Kumovîh rakov zaliv Alaska.- Trudy Vsesoiuznogo Nauchno-Issledovatel'skogo Instituta Morskogo Rybnogo Khoziaistva i Okeanografii 58:79–84.
- Bassindale, R., & J.H. Barrett., (1957). The Dale Fort marine fauna. Proceedings of the Bristol Naturalists' Society 29 (3): 227–328.
- Bate, C.S., (1856a). On the British Diastylidae. The Annals and Magazine of Natural History 102: 446–465.
- Bate, C.S., (1856b). On the British Edriophthalmata. Rep. Brit. Assoc. Adv. Sci. Glasgow, 1855: 18–62
- Bate, C.S., (1856c). On the British Diastylidae (letter to the editors). The Annals and Magazine of Natural History, Series 2, 18: 187.
- Bate, C.S., (1858) On a new genus and new species of Diastylidae. Journal of the Royal Dublin Society 2: 101–104.
- Bate, C.S., (1878). XLVII.- Two new Crustacea from the coast of Aberdeen. The Annals and Magazine of Natural History, Ser. 5, 1: 409–411.
- Bate, S., (1859). On some British Diastylidae. The Annals and Magazine of Natural History 102 (3): 273–275.
- Bate, S., (1865). XI.- Carcinological gleanings.- No. I. The Annals and Magazine of Natural History, Ser. 3, 15 (86): 81–88 (Plate I).
- Bate, S., (1866). Nannastacidæ. The Record of the Zoological Literature. 1865. 2: 329.
- Bazin, F., (1966). Contribution a l´inventaire faunistique du littoral Normand:Cumacea et Mysidacea. Bulletin de la Société Linnéenne de Normandie, Series 10, 7: 170–179.
- Beaumont, W.I., (1900). Part II.- The benthos (dredging and shore-collecting). VII.- Report on the results of dredging and shore-collecting. In: Browne, E.T. et al.:The fauna and flora of Valencia Harbour on the west coast of Ireland. Proceedings of the Royal Irish Academy, Ser. 3, 5: 754–798.
- Bédard, J., (1969). Feeding of the least, crested and parakeet auklets around St. Lawrence Island, Alaska. Canadian Journal of Zoology 47: 1025–1050.
- Begun, T., & M.T. Gomoiu., (2002). Contributions to the knowledge of cumacean and mysid populations from the Ukrainian littoral and Dniestr, Burnas and Alibei limans. Pages, 213–220, In: Mustata G. (ed.), [Working Scientific Session:Life in Water and on land in the Third Millennium, (19–20 October 2001) at the Marine Biological Station "Prof. Dr. Ioan Borcea" Agigea. Homage Volume] Lucrarile Sesiunii Stiintifice:Viata in Apa si Pamant in Mileniul III (19–20 Octombrie 2001) a Statiunii Biologice Marine "Prof. Dr. Ioan Borcea" Agigea. Volumn Omagial. Editura Universitatii "Alexandru Ioan Cuza", Iasi.
- Behning, A., (1923). K. voprusu o recinîh Peracarida pontokaspiiskogo basseina. Russkii Gidrobiologicheskii Zhurnal 2: 11–12.
- Behning, A., (1924a). Zur Erforschung der am Flussboden der Wolga lebenden Organismen. Monographien der Biologischen Wolga-Station der Naturforscher-Gesellschaft zu Saratow 1: I-X, 1–398.
- Behning, A., (1924b). Studien über die Malakostraken des Wolgabassins. Internationale Revue der Gesamten Hydrobiologie und Hydrographie 12 (3–4): 228–247.
- Behning, A., (1940). Über das Benthos des Kaspiseemmrbusen Mertvy Kultuk und Kajdak. Ak. Nauk CCCR 155–182.
- Beling, D.E., (1929). La faune aquatique des fleuves méridionaux de l´Ukraïne en rapport avec la question de son origine. Verhandlungen der Internationalen Vereinigung für Theoretische und Angewandte Limnologie 4: 213–239.
- Bell, J.D., & M.L. Harmelin-Vivien., (1983). Fish fauna of French Mediterranean Posidonia oceanica seagrass meadows. 2. Feeding habits. Tethys 11 (1): 1–14.
- Bell, J.D., J.J. Burchmore, & D.A. Pollard., (1978). Feeding ecology of a scorpaenid fish, the fortescue Centropogon australis, from a Posidonia seagrass habitat in New South Wales. Australian Journal of Marine and Freshwater Research 29 (2): 175–185.
- Bell, T., (1853). A History of the British Stalk-Eyed Crustacea. John Van Voorst, London.
- Bell, T., (1855). Account of the Crustacea. Pages 403–405, In: The Last of the Arctic Voyages:Being a Narrative of the Expedition in H.M.S. Assistance, Under the Command of Captain Sir Edward Belcher, C.B., in Search of Sir John Franklin during the Years 1852–53–54. With Notes on the Natural History, by Sir John Richardson, Professor Owen, Thomas Bell, J.W. Salter, and Lovell Reeve. In Two Volumes. Vol. II. Lowell Reeve, London.
- Belloc, G., (1960). Catalogue des types de Cumacés et de Leptostracés du Musée océanographique de Monaco. Bulletin de l´Institut Océanographique, 1173: 1–4.
- Belyaev, G.M., (1966). Donnaya Fauna Naibol'shikh Gubin (Ul'traabissali) Mirovogo Okeana [Hadal Bottom Fauna of the World Ocean]. Izatel'stvo "Nauka", Moskva.
- Belyaev, G.M., (1968). The ultra-abyssal bottom fauna. Chapter 7 (pages 217–238), In: Zenkevitch, L.A., Glubokovodnaia donnaia fauna Pleuston, Part 2, In: Institut Okeanologii imp. P.P. Shirshova (corp. author), Biologiia Tikhogo Okeana [Biology of the Pacific Ocean]. Academy of Sciences, Moscow, USSR (translation 487, U.S. Naval Oceanographic Office, Washington, D.C.)
- Belyaev, G.M., (1989). (translated to English, 2004). Deep-Sea Ocean Trenches and Their Fauna. Nauka Publishing House, Moscow.
- Bemvenuti, C.E., (1997). Benthic invertebrates. Pages 43–46, In: Seeliger, U., C. Odebrecht, & J. Castello (eds.), Subtropical Convergence Environments/ The Coast and Sea in the Southwestern Atlantic. Springer Verlag, Heidelberg.
- Bemvenuti, C.E., & S. Netto., (1998). Distribution and seasonal patterns of the sublittoral benthic macrofauna of Patos Lagoon (South Brazil). Revista Brasiliera de Biologia 58 (2): 211–221.
- Bemvenuti, C.E., J.S. Rosa-Filho, & M. Elliott., (2003). Changes in soft-bottom macrobenthic assemblages after a sulphuric acid spill in the Rio Grande Harbor (RS, Brazil). Brazilian Journal of Biology 63 (2): 183–194.
- Bergmann, M. S.K. Wieczorek, P.G. Moore, & R.J.A. Atkinson., (2002). Utilisation of invertebrates discarded from the Nephrops fishery by variously selective benthic scavengers in the west of Scotland. Marine Ecology Progress Series 233: 185–198.
- Bertrand, H., (1940). Les Crustacés Malacostracés de la région Dinardaise. Bulletin du Laboratoire Maritime de Dinard 22: 8–33.
- Bertrand, H., (1941). Les Crustacés Malacostracés de la région Dinardaise (2e note). Bulletin du Laboratoire Maritime de Dinard 23: 3–23.
- Bertrand, H., (1944). Les Crustacés Malacostacés de la région Dinardaise (4e note). Bulletin du Laboratoire Maritime de Dinard 26: 2–6.
- Beyst, B., A. Cattrijsse, & J. Mees., (1999). Feeding ecology of juvenile flatfishes of the surf zone of a sandy beach. Journal of Fish Biology 55 :1171–1186.
- Beyst, B., D. Buysse, A. Dewicke, & J. Mees., (2001). Surf zone hyperbenthos of Belgian sandy beaches:seasonal patterns. Estuarine, Coastal and Shelf Science 53: 877–895.
- Bieri, R., & T. Tokioka., (1968). Dragonet II, an opening-closing quantitative trawl for the study of microvertical distribution of zooplankton and the meio-epibenthos. Publications of the Seto Marine Biology Laboratory 13: 373–390.
- Bij de Vaate, A., K. Jazdzewski, H.A.M. Ketelaars, S. Gollasch, & G. Van der Velde., (2002). Geographical patterns in range extension of Ponto-Caspian macroinvertebrate species in Europe. Canadian Journal of Fisheries and Aquatic Science 59: 1159–1174.
- Birstein, J.A., (1940). Cumacea. Jizn. Presnyh vod, I.M.-L. Zd. Ak. Nauk SSSR:411–413.
- Birstein, J.A. and N.N. Romanova, (1968). In: Atlas bespozvonochnykh Kaspiiskogo moria (Atlas of invertebrates from Caspian sea) Pishchevaia Promyshlennost, Moscow, 241–290.
- Bishop, J. D., (1980). Notes on the Genus Ceratocuma Calman (Crustacea, Cumacea), with a description of C. cyrtum sp. nov. Journal of Natural History 14: 373–388.
- Bishop, J. D., (1981a). A revised definition of the Genus Epileucon Jones (Crustacea, Cumacea), with descriptions of species from the deep Atlantic. The Royal Society 291 (1052): 353–409.
- Bishop, J. D., (1981b). Two new leuconids (Peracarida, Cumacea) of widespread occurrence in the deep Atlantic. Crustaceana 40: 144–159.
- Bishop, J. D., (1981c). Selection of lectotypes for species of Leucon Kroyer (Peracarida, Cumacea) described from the catch of the Ingolf expedition. Crustaceana 41: 317–318.
- Bishop, J. D., (1982a). Three new species of the Genus Leucon Krøyer, 1946 (Crustacea: Cumacea) from the continental slope off Surinam. Zoological journal of the Linnean Society 74: 345–357.
- Bishop, J. D. D., (1982b). The growth, development and reproduction of a deep sea cumacean (Crustacea: Peracarida). Zoological journal of the Linnean Society 74: 359–380.
- Bishop, J.D.D., & J.P. Hartley., (1986). A comparison of the fauna retained on 0.5 mm and 1.0 mm meshes from benthic samples taken in the Beatrice Oilfield, Moray Firth, Scotland. Proceedings of the Royal Society of Edinburgh 91B:247–262.
- Bishop, J. D. D. and S. H. Shalla, (1994). Discrete seasonal reproduction in an abyssal peracarid crustacean. Deep-Sea Research Part I 41 (11/12): 1798–1800.
- Björck, W., (1915). Biologisk-faunistiska undersökningar av Öresund/ II. Crustacea Malacostraca och Pantopoda. Kongl. Fysiografiska Sällskapets Handlingar, N.F., 26 (7): 1–98.
- Björck, W., (1916). Bidrag till kännedomen om Kattegatts fauna. I. Crustacea. Arkiv för Zoologi 10 (16): 1–14.
- Blaber, S.J.M., N.F. Kure, S. Jackson, & D.P. Cyrus., (1983). The benthos of South Lake, St Lucia following a period of stable salinities. Suid-Afrikaanse Tydskrif vir Dierkunde 18 (4): 311–319.
- Blackwelder, R.E., (1963). Classification of the Animal Kingdom. Southern Illinois University Press, Carbondale.
- Blake, C.H., (1929). Pt. 3/ Crustacea/ New Crustacea from the Mount Desert Region. In: Proctor, W., C.W. Johnson, & C.H. Blake, Biological Survey of the Mount Desert Region. Wistar Institute of Anatomy and Biology, Philadelphia, PA, USA.
- Blake, J.A., & J.F. Grassle., (1994). Benthic community structure on the U.S. South Atlantic slope off the Carolinas: Spatial heterogeneity in a current-dominated system. Deep-Sea Research Part II, Topical Studies in Oceanography 41 (4–6): 835–874.
- Blake, J.A., & L. Watling., (1994). Chapter Twelve. Life history studies of deep-sea benthic infauna: Polychaeta, Aplacophora, and Cumacea from the continental slope off Massachusetts. Pages 243–260, In: Young, C.M., & K.J. Eckelbarger (eds.), Reproduction, Larval, Biology, and Recruitment of the Deep-Sea Benthos. Columbia University Press, New York.
- Blake, J.A., B. Hecker, J.F. Grassle, N. Maciolek-Blake, B. Brown, M. Curran, B. Dade, S. Freitas, and R.E. Ruff., (1985). Study of Biological Processes on the U.S. South Atlantic Slope and Rise. Phase 1. Benthic Characterization Study. Vol. 2 - Final Report. Prepared for the U.S. Department of the Interior, Minerals Management Service, Reston, VA, under Contract No. 14–12–0001–30064.
- Blanc, H., (1884). 1885. Sur le développement de l'œuf et la formation des feuillets primitifs chez la Cuma rathkei Krøyer. Archives des Sciences Physiques et Naturelles, Ser. 3, 12: 430–432.
- Błażewicz, M. and R. Heard, (1999). First record of the family Gynodiastylidae Stebbing, 1912 (Crustacea: Malacostraca: Cumacea) from Antarctic waters with the description of Gynodiastylis jazdzewskii, a new species. Proceedings of the Biological Society of Washington 112 (2): 362–367.
- Błażewicz, M. and K. Jazdzewski, (1995). Cumacea (Crustacea, Malacostraca) of Admiralty Bay, King George Island: a preliminary note. Polish Polar Research 16 (1–2): 71–86.
- Blazewicz-Paszkowycz, M., (1999). Morphology, distribution and biology of Antarctic Cumacea i Tanaidacea in Admiralty Bay (King George Island, South Shetland Island, Antarctic). Dissertation, University of Lódz, Poland.
- Blazewicz-Paszkowycz, M., (2001). Remarks on the population structure of two Antarctic peracarid crustaceans:Eudorella splendida Zimmer, 1902 (Cumacea) and Nototanais antarcticus (Hodgson, 1902) (Tanaidacea). Polish Polar Research 22 (1): 35–44.
- Błażewicz -Paskowycz, M. and R. Ligowski, (2002). Diatoms as a food source indicator for some Antarctic Cumacea and Tanaidacea (Crustacea). Antarctic Science 14 (1): 11–15.
- Błażewicz -Paszkowycz, M. and R. Heard, (2001). Observations on Cumacea (Malacostraca: Peracarida) from Antarctic and subantarctic waters. I. Ekleptostylis debroyeri (Diastylidae), a new species from waters off the Antarctic Peninsula. Proceedings of the Biological Society of Washington 114 (4): 907–917.
- Błażewicz-Paszkowycz, M., and Heard R.W., (2005a). Observations on Cumacea (Malacostraca: Peracarida) from Antarctic and subantarctic waters. II. The rediscovery and redescriptions of Diastylis hammoniae Zimmer, 1902 and Diastylis planifrons Calman, 1912. Journal of Natural History 39 (18): 1483–1489.
- Błażewicz-Paszkowycz, M., and Heard R.W., (2005b). Observations on Cumacea (Crustacea: Malacostraca) from Antarctic and Subantarctic waters. III. Supplemental description Holostylis helleri (Zimmer, 1907) and the description of Holostylis spinicauda n. sp. (Crustacea: Malacostraca: Diastylidae) from subantarctic waters. Proc. Biol. Soc. Wash., 118 (4): 660–673.
- Boas, J.E.V., (1883). Studien über die Verwandtschaftsbeziehungen der Malakostraken. Morphologisches Jahrbuch 8: 485–579 (Plates XXI-XXIV).
- Bocquet-Védrine & Bourdon,, (1984). Cryptogaster cumacei n.g., n.sp., premier rhizocéphale parasite d´un Cumacé. Crustaceana 46 (3): 261–270.
- Boeck, A., (1864). Beskrivelse og fremlagde Tegninger af 4 norske Decapoder, undersøgte af Overlæge Danielssen og ham. Forhandlinger i Videnskafb-Selskabet i Christiania, 1863:189–190.
- Boesch, D.F., (1979). Chapter 6/ Benthic Ecological Studies: Macrobenthos. Special Report in Applied Marine Science and Ocean Engineering No. 194. Virginia Institute of Marine Science, Gloucester Point.
- Boesch, D.F., & R.J. Diaz., (1974). New records of peracarid crustaceans from oligohaline waters of the Chesapeake Bay. Chesapeake Science 15 (1): 56–59.
- Boesch, D.F., Kraeuter, J.N., & D.K. Serafy., (1977). Distribution and Structure of Communities of Macrobenthos on the Outer Continental Shelf of the Middle Atlantic Bight: 1975–1976 Investigations. Special Report in Applied Marine Science and Ocean Engineering No. 175. Virginia Institute of Marine Science, Gloucester Point, VA, USA.
- Boesch, D.F., R.J. Diaz, & R.W. Virnstein., (1976). Effects of tropical storm Agnes on soft-bottom macrobenthic communities of the James and York estuaries and the lower Chesapeake Bay. Chesapeake Science 17 (4): 246–259.
- Bogdanos, C., & J. Satsmadjis., (1987). The Patraikos Gulf bottom fauna. Thalassographica 10 (1): 37–71.
- Bonnier, J., (1896). Édriophthalmes, résultats scientifiques de la campagne du Caudan dans le Golfe de Gascogne, Août- Septembre 1895. Ann. Ani. de Lyon: 527–689.
- Bonnier, J., (1903). Sur deux types nouveaux d´Epicarides parasites d´un Cumacé et d´un Schizopode. Comptes Rendus Hebdomaires Seances des Academie des Science 136: 102–103.
- Boroditch, N.D., (1978). The Caspian Peracarida (Crustacea) in the Saratov Water Reservoir. Zoologicheskii Zhurnal 57 (5): 783–785.
- Boroditch, N.D., (1979). [The discovery of Caspiocuma campylaspoides G.O. Sars (Crustacea, Cumacea) in Kuibyshev Reservoir]. Biologiya Vnutrennikh Vod Informatsionnyi Byulleten No. 43: 29–31.
- Borowski, C., & H. Thiel., (1998). Deep-sea macrofaunal impacts of a large-scale physical disturbance experiment in the southeast Pacific. Deep-Sea Research Part II: Topical Studies in Oceanography 45: 55–81.
- Bossé, L., B. Sainte-Marie, & J. Fournier., (1996). Les invertébrés des fonds meubles et la biogéographie du fjord du Saguenay. Rapport Technique Canadien Sciences Halieutiques et Aquatiques 2132: 1–45.
- Boudaya, L., L. Neifar, A. Taktak, M. Ghorbel, & A. Bouain., (2007). Diet of Chelidonichthys obscurus and Chelidonichthys lastoviza (Pisces: Triglidae) from the Gulf of Gabes (Tunisia). Journal of Applied Ichthyology 23 (6): 646–653.
- Bousfield, E.L., (1958). Littoral marine arthropods and mollusks collected in western Nova Scotia, 1956. Proceedings of the Nova Scotia Institute of Science, 1956–1957, 24 (3): 303–325.
- Bousfield, E.L., (1962). Studies on littoral marine arthropods from the Bay of Fundy region. Bulletin (National Museum of Canada) 183: 42–62.
- Bousfield, E.L., (1982). Peracarida. Page 241, In: Parker, S.P. (ed.), Synopsis and Classification of Living Organisms. McGraw-Hill, New York.
- Bousfield, E.L., & A.H. Leim., (1960). The fauna of Minas Basin and Minas Channel. Bulletin (National Museum of Canada) 166: 1–30.
- Bowen, M.A., P.O. Smyth, D.F. Boesch, & J. van Montfrans., (1979). Comparative biogeography of benthic macrocrustaceans of the middle Atlantic (U.S.A.) continental shelf. Bulletin of the Biological Society of Washington 3: 214–255.
- Bowman, T.E., & L.G. Abele., (1982). Classification of the recent Crustacea. Pages 1–27, In: Abele, L.G. (ed.), Systematics, the Fossil Record, and Biogeography, Volume 1, In: Bliss, D.E. (ed.), The Biology of Crustacea. Academic Press, New York. Bowman, T.E. 1971. The case of the nonubiquitous telson and the fraudulent furca. Crustaceana 21: 165–175.
- Boxshall, G. A. and D. Defaye, (1995). Copépodes nouveaux (Siphonostomatoidea, Nicothoidae) parasites de cumacés et de décapodes profonds. Bulletin of the national Museum of Natural History, Paris. Section A 17 (3–4): 283–296.
- Boxshall, G.A., & R.J. Lincoln., (1987). The life cycle of the Tantulocarida (Crustacea). Philosophical Transactions of the Royal Society of London, Series B. Biological Sciences 315: 267–303.
- Boyden, C.R., & C. Little., (1973). Faunal distributions in soft sediments of the Severn Estuary. Estuarine and Coastal Marine Science 1:203–223.
- Boyden, C.R., J.H. Crothers, C. Little, & C. Mettam., (1977). The intertidal invertebrate fauna of the Severn Estuary. Field Studies 4:477–554.
- Boysen, H.O., (1975). Das Hyperbenthos in der Kieler Bucht - Zusammensetzung, Jahresgang und Verbreitung. Berichte der Deutschen Wissenschaftlichen Kommission für Meeresforschung 24:151–171.
- Brandt, A., (1993). Composition, abundance, and diversity of peracarid crustaceans on a transect of the Kolbeinsey Ridge, north of Iceland. Polar Biology 13 (8): 565–576.
- Brandt, A., (1995). Peracarid fauna (Crustacea, Malacostraca) of the Northeast Water Polynya off Greenland: documenting close benthic-pelagic coupling in the Westwind Trough. Marine Ecology Progress Series 121 (1–3): 39–51.
- Brandt, A., (1996). Peracarid crustaceans (Malacostraca) from a 'time-series station' in the Westwind Trough of the New- Polynya (Greenland):a benthic response to productivity. Crustaceana 69 (8): 985–1004.
- Brandt, A., (1997a). Abundance, diversity and community patterns of epibenthic- and benthic-boundary layer peracarid crustaceans at 75°N off East Greenland. Polar Biology 17: 159–174.
- Brandt, A., (1997b). Biodiversity of peracarid crustaceans (Malacostraca) from the shelf down to the deep Arctic Ocean. Biodiversity and Conservation 6: 1533–1556.
- Brandt, A., (1999). On the origin and evolution of Antarctic Peracarida (Crustacea, Malacostraca)- Scientia Marina 63, supplement 1: 261–274.
- Brandt, A., (2001). Great differences in peracarid crustacean density between the Arctic and Antarctic deep sea. Polar Biology 24: 785–789.
- Brandt, A., (2005). Evolution of Antarctic biodiversity in the context of the past: the importance of the Southern Ocean deep sea. Antarctic Science 17 (4): 509–521.
- Brandt, A., & D. Barthel., (1995). An improved supra- and epibenthic sledge for catching peracarida (Crustacea, Malacostraca. Ophelia 43 (1): 15–23.
- Brandt, A., & D. Piepenburg., (1994). Peracarid crustacean assemblages on the Kolbeinsky Ridge, north of Iceland. Polar Biology 14: 97–105.
- Brandt, A., & J. Berge., (2007). Peracarid composition, diversity and species richness in the area of the Northeast Water polynya, East Greenland (Crustacea, Malacostraca). Polar Biology 31 (1): 15–22.
- Brandt, A., & K. Schnack., (1999). Macrofaunal abundance at 79° off East Greenland:opposing data from epibenthic-sledge and box-corer samples.- Polar Biology 22:75–81.
- Brandt, A., K. Linse, & U. Weber., (1997). Abundance and diversity of peracarid taxa (Crustacea, Malacostraca) along a transect through the Beagle Channel, Patagonia. Polar Biology 18: 83–90.
- Brandt, A., N. Brenke, H.-G. Andres, S. Brix, J. Guerrero-Kommritz, U. Mühlenhardt-Siegel, & J.-W. Wägele., (2005). Diversity of peracarid crustaceans (Malacostraca) from the abyssal plain of the Angola basin. Organisms, Diversity & Evolution 5 (Supplement 1): 105–112; electronic supplement 1 at http://www.senckenberg.de/odes/05–01.htm.
- Brandt, A., S. Vassilenko, D. Piepenburg, & M. Thurston., (1996). The species composition of the peracarid fauna (Crustacea, Malacostraca) of the Northeast Water Polynya (Greenland). Meddelelser om Grønland, Bioscience 44: 3–30.
- Brandt, A., U. Mühlenhardt-Siegel, & A. Schmidt., (1999). Density, diversity, and community patterns of selected peracarid taxa (Malacostraca) in the Beagle Channel, South America. Pages 541–558, In: Schram, F.R., & J.C. von Vaupel Klein (eds.), Crustaceans and The Biodiversity Crisis: Proceedings of the Fourth International Crustacean Congress, July 20–24, 1998, volume I. Koninklijke Brill NV, Leiden, Netherlands.
- Brandt, A., U. Mühlenhardt-Siegel, & V. Siegel., (1998). An account of the Mysidacea (Crustacea, Malacostraca) of the Southern Ocean. Antarctic Science 10 (1): 3–11.
- Brandt, A., W. Brökeland, B. Hilbig, U. Mühlenhardt-Siegel, M. Raupach, G. Strieso, & G. Wegener., (2007). Biodiversity and zoogeography of Crustacea Peracarida and Polychaeta. Pages 27–32, In: Cruise Report Ant-XIX/3 and ANT- XIX/4 (ANDEEP I and II).
- Brandt, K., (1893). Die mit der Kurre oder der Dredge auf der Expedition gesammelten Thiere. Pages 141–148, In: In: Sechster Bericht der Commission zur Wissenschaftlichen Untersuchung der Deutschen Meere, in Kiel für die Jahre 1887 bis 1891. XVII. bis XXI. Jahrgang. II. Heft. Paul Parey, Berlin.
- Brattegard, T., & W. Vader., (1972). A collection of Peracarida from Möre and Romsdal, northwestern Norway. Sarsia 49: 33–40.
- Brewin, P.E, P.K. Probert, & M.F. Barker., (2008). Deep-basin macrobenthos of Doubtful Sound, Fiordland, New Zealand. New Zealand Journal of Marine and Freshwater Research 42 (1): 1–21.
- Bright, T.J., (1970). Food of deep-sea bottom fishes. Pages 245–252, In: Pequegnat, W.E., & F.A. Chace, Jr. (eds.), Contributions on the Biology of the Gulf of Mexico, Vol. 1., Texas A&M University Oceanographic Studies. Gulf Publishing Company, Houston, Texas.
- Brökeland, W., Choudhury, M. & Brandt, A., (2007) Composition, abundance and distribution of Peracarida from the Southern Ocean deep sea. Deep-Sea Research Part II. 54 (16–17): 1752–1759.
- Brown, A.C., (1964). Food relationships on the intertidal sandy beaches of the Cape Peninsula. South African Journal of Science 60 (2): 35–41.
- Bruce, J.R., J.S. Colman, & N.S. Jones., (1963). Marine Fauna of the Isle of Man and its Surrounding Seas. Liverpool University Press, Liverpool.
- Brum, I.N. da Silva, (1966). Oxyurostylis salinoi sp. n. do littoral Brasileiro (Crustacea, Cumacea). Rev. Brasil. Biol. 26 (1): 59–67.-
- Brum, I.N. da Silva., (1970). Ocorréncia de Leptocuma kinbergii G.O. Sars, 1873, no litoral Brasileiro (Crustacea, Cumacea). Revista Brasileira de Biologia 30 (1): 87–90.

Brum, I.N. da Silva. (1971b). Nova espécie Brasileira do género Makrokylindrus Stebbing, 1912. Boletim do Museu Nacional, Rio de Janeiro, Zoologia, N.S., No. 281: 1–7.

- Brunel, P., (1961). Liste taxonomique des Invertébrés marins des parages de la Gaspésie identifiés au 3 août 1959. Station Biol. mar Grande-Rivière, Cah. Inf. 7: 1–9.
- Brunel, P., (1962). Inventaire taxonomique des Invertébrés marins du golfe Saint-Laurent.- Sta. Biol. Mar. Grande-Rivière, Rapp. Ann. 1961: 39–44.
- Brunel, P., (1968). The vertical migrations of cod in the southwestern Gulf of St. Lawrence, with special reference to feeding habits and prey distribution. Ph.D. thesis, McGill University, Montréal.
- Brunel, P., (1970). Catalogue d´invertébrés benthiques du Golfe Saint-Laurent recueillis de 1951 à 1966 par la Station de Biologie marine de Grande-Rivière. Travaux de Biologie de l´Université de Montréal 53: 3–54.
- Brunel, P., D. Messier, & D. Granger., (1975). Possible control by the seasonal regime of primary production of the dominance structure in shelf hyperbenthic communities of the Gulf of St. Laurence. American Society of Limnology & Oceanography 1.
- Brunel, P., L. Bosse, & G. Lamarche., (1998). Catalogue of the marine invertebrates of the Estuary and Gulf of Saint Lawrence. Canadian Special Publication of Fisheries and Aquatic Sciences 126: 1–405.
- Bruntz, L. (1909). XII Sur l´existence d´organes globuligènes chez les Cumacés. Archives de Zoologie Expérimentale et Générale, Series 4, 9:LXV-LXIX.
- Brusca, R.C., & M.E. Hendrickx., (2005). 12. Crustacea 4. Peracarida: Lophogastrida, Mysida, Amphipoda, Tanaidacea & Cumacea. Pages 139–157, In: Henrickx, M.E., R.C. Brusca, & L.T. Findley (eds.), Listado y Distribución de la Macrofauna del Golfo de California, México/ Parte 1. Invertebrados. Arizona-Sonora Desert Museum.
- Bruun, A.F., S.V. Greve, H. Mielche, & R. Sparck., (1953). Galatheas Jordomsejling 1950–1952. Kobenhavn.
- Bryazgin, V.F., & A.M. Sennikov., (1979). [Cumacea, Isopoda and Decapoda of the Barents Sea. 1. Species composition and ecological characteristics.]. Pages 89–102, In: Filimonova, G.F. [ed.], [Biology and Individual Development of Certain Possible Objects for Mariculture in the Seas of the European North]. Kola Branch of the Academy of Sciences USSR, Apatity.
- Buchanan, J.B., & R.M. Warwick., (1974). An estimate of benthic macrofaunal production in the offshore mud of the Northumberland coast. Journal of the Marine Biological Association of the United Kingdom 54: 197–222.
- Buchanan, R.A., & A.D. Sekerak., (1982). Vertical distribution of zooplankton in eastern Lancaster Sound and western Baffin Bay, July–October 1978. Arctic 35 (1): 41–55.
- Burmeister, J., (1883). Beiträge zur Anatomie und Histologie von Cuma Rathkei Kr. Ph.D thesis, Kiel University.
- Butschinsky, P., (1893). Zur Embryologie der Cumaceen. Zoologischer Anzeiger 16: 386–387.
- Butschinsky, P., (1895). Nablyu nad émbrional´nuim razvitiem Malacostraca. Zapiski Novorossiskagho Obshchestva estestvoispuitalelei 19 (2): 1–216 (Plates i-xii).

== C ==
- Cabral, H.N., M. Lopes, & R. Loeper., (2002). Trophic niche overlap between flatfishes in a nursery area on the Portuguese coast. Scientia Marina 66 (3): 293–300.
- Caddy, J.F., T. Amaratunga, M.J. Dadswell, T. Edelstein, L.E. Linkletter, B.R. McMullin, A.B. Stasko, & H.W. van de Poll., (1977). Northumberland Strait Project, Part I: Benthic fauna, flora, demersal fish, and sedimentary data. Manuscript Report / Fisheries and Marine Service, Fisheries and Environment Canada 1431: 1–46.
- Cahoon, L.B., & C.R. Tronzo., (1990). New records of amphipods and cumaceans in demersal zooplankton collections from Onslow Bay, North Carolina. Journal of the Elisha Mitchell Scientific Society 106 (3): 78–84.
- Calman, W.-J., (1917). Cumacés. Deuxième Expédition Antarctique Française (1908–1910) (p. 9).
- Calman, W.T., (1896). On the genus Anaspides and its affinities with certain fossil Crustacea. Transactions of the Royal Society of Edinburgh 38 (4): 787–802 (2 plates).
- Calman, W. T., (1904a). Report on the Cumacea collected by professor Herdman, at Ceylon, in 1902. The Royal Society, Supplementary Report 7: 159–180.
- Calman, W.T., (1904b). On the classification of the Crustacea Malacostraca. The Annals and Magazine of Natural History 7 (13): 144–158.
- Calman, W. T., (1905a). The marine fauna of the West Coast of Ireland, Part IV, Appendix I. Fisheries, Ireland, Sci. Invest., 1904, I I: 3–52.
- Calman, W. T., (1905b). The Cumacea of the Siboga Expedition. Uitkomsten op Zoölogisch, Botanisch, Oceanographisch en Geologisch Gebied 36: 1–23.
- Calman, W. T., (1906). The Cumacea of the Puritan Expedition. Mitteilungen a. d. Zoologischen Station zu Neapel 14: 411–432.
- Calman, W. T., (1907a). Crustacea. 2–Cumacea. National Antarctic Expedition. Natural History 2: 1–6.
- Calman, W. T., (1907b). Sur quelques Cumacés de côtes de France. Bulletin du Muséum d'Histoire Naturelle 2: 116.
- Calman, W. T., (1907c). On new or rare Crustacea of the Order Cumacea from the collection of the Copenhagen Museum. Transactions of the Zoological Society of London 18: 1–56.
- Calman, W. T., (1908). Notes on a small collection of plankton from New Zealand. 1. Crustacea (excluding Copepoda). Annals of the Magazine of Natural History 8 (1): 232–240.
- Calman, W.T., (1909). Part VII, Appendiculata, Third Fascicle, Crustacea, Chapter 10/ The Cumacea. Pages 183–189, In: Lankester, R. (ed.), A Treatise on Zoology. Adam & Charles Black, London.
- Calman, W. T., (1910a). Les Cumacés des expéditions de Travailleur et du Talisman. Bulletin of the Museum of Histoire Naturelle in Paris 16: 180–182.
- Calman, W. T., (1910b). On Heterocuma sarsi Miers. Annals of the Magazine of Natural History 8 (6): 612–616.
- Calman, W. T., (1911a). On new or rare Crustacea of the Order Cumacea from the collection of the Copenhagen Museum, Part II. Transactions of the Zoological Society of London 18: 341–399.
- Calman, W.T., (1911b). The Life of Crustacea. Methuen & Co. Ltd., London.
- Calman, W. T., (1912). The Crustacea of the Order Cumacea in the collection of the United States National Museum. Proceedings of the United States National Museum 41 (1876): 603–676.
- Calman, W. T., (1917). British Antarctic (Terra Nova) Expedition, 1910. Natural History 3: 137–162.
- Calman, W. T., (1917). Cumacés. Docum. Sci. Deuxième Expédition Antarctique Française, (1908–1910), Paris 1: 145–155.
- Calman, W. T., (1918). Cumacea and Phyllocarida. Australasian Antarctic Expedition 1911–1914. Scientific Reports, Series C-Zoology and Botany 5 (6): 5–9.
- Calman, W. T., (1920). Cumacea. Report of the Canadian Arctic Expedition 1913–1918 7 (C): 3–4.
- Calman, W. T., (1927). Report on the Phyllocarida, Cumacea and Stomatopoda. Transactions of the Zoological Society of London 22, part 3 (15): 399–401.
- Camp, D.K., (1998). Checklist of shallow-water marine malacostracan Crustacea of Florida. Pages 123–189, In: Camp, D.K., W.G. Lyons, & T.H. Perkins, Checklists of Selected Shallow-Water Marine Invertebrates of Florida. Florida Department of Environmental Protection, FMRI Technical Report TR-3, St. Petersburg, Florida.
- Camp, D.K., N.H. Whiting, & R.E. Martin., (1977). Nearshore marine ecology at Hutchinson Island, Florida:1971–1974. V. Arthropods. Florida Marine Research Publications 25: 1–63.
- Candeias, A., (1929). Nota sombre uma especia nova do Genero Iphinoe, Bate . Memórias e Estudos do Museu Zoológico da Universidade de Coimbra 20: 1–5.
- Capelo, J.C., J.V. Garcia, & G. Pereira., (2004). Benthic macroinvertebrate diversity of the Gulf of Paria and Orinoco Delta. RAP Bulletin of Biological Assessment 37: 55–60, 198–203.
- Caragitsou, E., & N. Tsimenidis., (1982). Seasonal changes of food spectrum and day-time rhythm of feeding of the red mullet (Mullus barbatus) in the Thracian Sea. Thalassographica 5 (2): 105–115.
- Cardinale, M., F. Colloca, & G.D. Ardizzone., (1997). Feeding ecology of Mediterranean razorfish Xyrichthys novacula in the Tyrrhenian Sea (central Mediterranean Sea). Journal of Applied Ichthyology 13 (3): 105–111.
- Carleton J.H., & W.M. Hamner., (2007). The hyperbenthic plankton community: composition, distribution, and abundance in a coral reef lagoon. Marine Ecology Progress Series 336: 77–88.
- Carleton, J.H., R. Brinkman, & P.J. Doherty., (2001). Zooplankton community structure and water flow in the lee of Helix Reef (Great Barrier Reef, Australia). Marine Biology 139 (4): 705–717.
- Carpenter, W.B., & J.G. Jeffreys., (1870). 1871. Report on deep-sea researches carried on during the months of July, August, and September 1870, in H.M. Surveying-Ship 'Porcupine'. Proceedings of the Royal Society of London 19: 145–221.
- Carpine, C., (1970). Écologie de l´étage bathyal dans la Méditerranée occidentale. Mémoires de l´Institut Océanographique, Monaco 2: 1–146.
- Carrassón, M., & J. Matallanas., (2001). Feeding ecology of the Mediterranean spiderfish, Bathypterois mediterraneus, on the western Mediterranean slope. Fishery Bulletin 99: 266–274.
- Carrassón, M., & J. Matallanas., (2002). Diets of deep-sea macrourid fishes in the western Mediterranean. Marine Ecology Progress Series 234: 215–228.
- Carrasson, M., & J. Matallanas., (2002). Feeding strategies of Polyacanthonotus rissoanus (Pisces: Notacanthidae) in the deep western Mediterranean. Journal of the Marine Biological Association of the United Kingdom 82 (4): 665–671.
- Carrassón, M., & J.E. Cartes., (2002). Trophic relationships in a Mediterranean deep-sea fish community:partition of food resources, dietary overlap and connections within the benthic boundary layer. Marine Ecology Progress Series 241: 41–55.
- Cartes, J.E., (1998). Feeding strategies and partition of food resources in deep-water decapod crustaceans (400–2300 m). JMBA 78: 509–524.
- Cartes, J.E., & J.C. Sorbe., (1993). Les communautés suprabenthiques bathyales de la Mer Catalane (Méditerranée Occidentale):Données préliminaires sur la répartition bathymétrique et l´abondance des Crustacés Péracarides. Crustaceana 64 (2): 155–171.
- Cartes, J. E. & J. C. Sorbe, (1996). Temporal population structure of deepwater cumaceans from the western Mediterranean slope. Deep-Sea Research Part I 43 (9): 1423–1438.
- Cartes, J. E. & J. C. Sorbe, (1997) Bathyal cumaceans of the Catalan Sea (north-western Mediterranean): faunistic composition, diversity and near-bottom distribution along the slope (between 389 and 1859 m). J. Nat. Hist. 31: 1041–1054.
- Cartes, J.E., & J.C. Sorbe., (1999). Estimating secondary production in bathyal suprabenthic peracarid crustaceans from the Catalan Sea slope (western Mediterranean; 391–1255 m). Journal of Experimental Marine Biology and Ecology 239 (2): 195–210.
- Cartes, J.E., A. Grémare, F. Maynou, S. Villora-Moreno, & A. Dinet., (2002). Bathymetric changes in the distributions of particulate organic matter and associated fauna along a deep-sea transect down the catalan sea slope (Northwestern Mediterranean). Progress in Oceanography 53: 29–56.
- Cartes, J.E., and J.C. Sorbe., (1996). Temporal population structure of deep-water cumaceans from the western Mediterranean slope. Deep-Sea Research Part I, 43 (9): 1423–1438.
- Cartes, J.E., D. Jaume, & T. Madurell., (2003). Local changes in the composition and community structure of suprabenthic peracarid crustaceans on the bathyal Mediterranean: influence of environmental factors. Marine Biology 143: 745–758.
- Cartes, J.E., F. Maynou, B. Morales-Nin, E. Massuti, & J. Moranta., (2001). Trophic structure of a bathyal benthopelagic boundary layer community south of the Balearic Islands (southwestern Mediterranean). Marine Ecology Progress Series 215: 23–35.
- Cartes, J.E., F. Maynou, J. Moranta, E. Massuti, D. Lloris, & B. Morales-Nin., (2004). Patterns of bathymetric distribution among deep-sea fauna at local spatial scale: comparison of mainland vs. insular areas. Progress in Oceanography 60 (1): 29–45.
- Cartes, J.E., M. Elizalde, & J.C. Sorbe., (2001). Contrasting life-histories, secondary production, and trophic structure of Peracarid assemblages of the bathyal suprabenthos from the Bay of Biscay (NE Atlantic and the Catalan Sea (NW Mediterranean). Deep-Sea Research Part I, Oceanographic Research Papers 48: 2209–2232.
- Cartes, J.E., T. Brey, J.C. Sorbe, and F. Maynou., (2002). Comparing production-biomass ratios of benthos and suprabenthos in macrofaunal marine crustaceans. Canadian Journal of Fisheries and Aquatic Sciences 59: 1616–1625.
- Cartes, J.E., T. Madurell, E. Fanelli, & J.L. López-Jurado., (2008). Dynamics of suprabenthos-zooplankton communities around the Balearic Islands (western Mediterranean): Influence of environmental variables and effects on the biological cycle of Aristeus antennatus.- Journal of Marine Systems 71 (3–4): 316–335.
- Cartes, J.E., V. Papiol, A. Palanques, J. Guillen, & M. Demestre., (2007). Dynamics of suprabenthos off the Ebro Delta (Catalan Sea:western Mediterranean): Spatial 13 and temporal patterns and relationships with environmental factors. Estuarine, Coastal and Shelf Science 75 (4): 501–515.
- Carus, J.V., (1885). Prodromus Faune Mediterraneae. Vol. I, Stuttgart.
- Casanova, B., (1993). L´origine protocéphalique de la carapace chez les Thermosbaenacés, Tanaidacés, Cumacés et Stomatopodes. Crustaceana 65: 144–150.
- Caspers, H., (1951). Quantitative Untersuchungen über die Bodentierwelt des Schwarzen Meeres im bulgarischen Küstenbereich. Archiv für Hydrobiologie 45: 1–192.
- Castillo, G.C., H.W. Li, & P.A. Rossignol., (2000). Absence of overall feedback in a benthic estuarine community:A system potentially buffered from impacts of biological invasions. Estuaries 23 (2): 275–291.
- Casu, D., G. Ceccherelli, & A. Castelli., (2006). Immediate effects of experimental human trampling on mid-upper intertidal benthic invertebrates at the Asinara Island MPA (NW Mediterranean). Hydrobiologia 555: 271–279.
- Casu, D., G. Ceccherelli, M. Curini-Galletti, & A. Castelli., (2006). Human exclusion from rocky shores in a mediterranean marine protected area (MPA):An opportunity to investigate the effects of trampling. Marine Environmental Research 62 (1): 15–32.
- Cate, P.C., (1984). Untersuchungen zur Systematik und Okologie der Cumaceenfauna der Adria und des Mittelmeeres. Dissertation Abstracts International C European Abstracts 45 (3): 747.
- Charniaux-Cotton, H., C. Zerbib, & J.J. Meusy., (1966). Monographie de la glande androgène des Crustacés supérieurs. Crustaceana 10: 113–136 (+ 8 plates).
- Chen, J.-J., Z.-L. Xu, & X.-Z. Chen., (2008). Ecological Characteristics of Pelagic Cladocera and Cumacea in the Changjiang Estuary, China. Chinese Journal of Zoology 43 (5): 1–6.
- Cibic, T, O. Blasutto, & N. Bettoso., (2009). Microalgal-meiofaunal interactions in a sublittoral site of the Gulf of Trieste (northern Adriatic Sea, Italy):A three-year study. Journal of Experimental Marine Biology and Ecology 370 (1–2): 144–154.
- Citarella, G., (1982). Le zooplancton de la baie de Shédiac (Nouveau-Brunswick). Journal of Plankton Research 4 (4): 791–812.
- Citarella, G., (1987). Plancton de la zone située entre la côte du Nouveau-Brunswick et I'Ile-du-Prince-Édouard (N.O. Atlantique). Ph.D. thesis, University of Aix-Marseille I.
- Clark, R.B. & A. Milne., (1955). The sublittoral fauna of two sandy bays on the Isle of Cumbrae, Firth of Clyde. Journal of the Marine Biological Association of the United Kingdom 34 (1): 161–180.
- Claus, C., (1876). Untersuchungen zur Erforschung der genealogischen Grundlage des Crustaceen-Systems. Ein Beitrag zur Descendenzlehre. Carl Gerold's Sohn, Wien.
- Claus, C., (1885). Neue Beiträge zur Morphologie der Crustaceen. Alfred Hölder, Wien (also published in Arbeiten aus dem Zoologischen Instituten der Universität Wien und der Zoologischen Station in Triest 6: 1–108).
- Cleve, P.T., (1903). Plankton-researches in 1901 and 1902. Kongliga Svenska Vetenskaps-Akademiens Handlingar 36 (8): 1–53.
- Cohen, Sahrye E; Bollens, Stephen M., (2008). Diet and growth of non-native Mississippi silversides and yellowfin gobies in restored and natural wetlands in the San Francisco Estuary. Marine Ecology Progress Series 368: 241–254.
- Colling, L.A., C.E. Bemvenuti, & M.S. Gandra., (2007). Seasonal variability on the structure of sublittoral macrozoobenthic association in the Patos Lagoon estuary, southern Brazil. Iheringia, Série Zoologia, Porto Alegre 97 (3): 257–262.
- Conradi, M., (1995). Distribución espacio-temporal de los peracáridos (Crustacea) asociados a Bugula neritina (L, 1758) en la Bahía de Algeciras.- Aspectos faunísticos y zoogeográficos. PhD thesis, University of Cadiz.
- Corbari, L., J.-C. Sorbe., (2001). Structure of the suprabenthic assemblages in the Capbreton area (SE of the bay of Biscay). Pages 96–101, In: Elbée, J., & P. Prouzet (coords.), Océanographie du Golfe de Gascogne. VII Colloq. Int., Biarritz, 4–6 avril 2000. IFREMER, Actes Colloq.
- Corbeil, H.-E., (1953). Analyse du contenu stomacal de la morue Gadus callarias Dans. Rapport - Station de Biologie Marine 1952. Contributions Département des Pêcheries Québec 43: 13–18.
- Corbera, J., (1994). A new record of Iphinoe crassipes Hansen, 1895 (Cumacea, Bodotriidae) from the Catalonian coast (NE Spain). Scientia Marina 58 (3): 273–276.
- Corbera, J., (1995). Check-list of Cumacea from Iberian waters. Miscellània Zoològica, 18: 57–75.
- Corbera, J., (2000). Systematics and distribution of cumaceans collected during BENTART-95 cruise around South Shetland Islands (Antarctica). Scientia Marina 64 (1): 9–28.
- Corbera, J., (2002). Amphi-Atlantic distribution of the Mancocumatinae (Cumacea: Bodotriidae), with description of a new genus dwelling in marine lava caves of Tenerife (Canary Islands). Zoological Journal of the Linnean Society 134 (4): 453–461.
- Corbera, J., (2004). A new species of Scherocumella (Crustacea, Cumacea) from a coral lagoon of Lifou, New Caledonia. Zoosystema 26 (1): 65–71.
- Corbera J., (2006a). Lampropidae (Crustacea, Peracarida, Cumacea) from deep waters of New Caledonia. In: Richer de Forges, B., & J.-L. Justine (eds.), Tropical Deep-Sea Benthos, Vol. 24. Mem. Mémoires du Muséum National d´Histoire Naturelle 193: 143–162.
- Corbera, J., (2006b). A new operculate cumacean genus (Bodotriidae, Vaunthompsoniinae) from deep waters of New Caledonia. Zoosystema 28 (2): 325–330.
- Corbera J., (2006c). Order Cumacea (online article at "Fauna Ibérica" website) (http://www.fauna- iberica.mncn.csic.es/faunaib/arthropoda/crustacea/cumacea.php).
- Corbera J., (2006d). Arthropoda, Crustacea, Cumacea. In: Desbruyeres, D., M. Segonzac, & M. Bright (eds.), Handbook of Deep-Sea Hydrothermal Vent Fauna. Denisia 18: 370–371.
- Corbera, J., (2008a). Deep-sea Bodotriidae (Crustacea: Cumacea) from New Caledonia, Fiji and Indonesia. Zoological Journal of the Linnean Society, 152 (2): 227.
- Corbera J., (2008b). New cumacean species (Crustacea:Peracarida) from Salomon Islands. Zootaxa 1743: 17–33.
- Corbera, J., & B.S. Galil., (2001). Cumaceans (Crustacea, Peracarida) from the lower slope of the northern Israel coast, with a discussion on the status of Platysympus typicus. Israel Journal of Zoology 47 (2): 135–146.
- Corbera, J., Galil, B.S., (2007). Colonisation of the eastern Mediterranean by Red Sea cumaceans, with the description of a new species. Sci. Mar., 71 (1): 29–36
- Corbera, J., & A. Garcia-Rubies., (1998). Cumaceans (Crustacea) of the Medes Islands (Catalonia, Spain) with special attention to the genera Bodotria and Iphinoe. Scientia Marina 62 (1–2): 101–112.
- Corbera, J. and A. Ramos, (2003). Cumaceans from the Bellingshausen Sea and neighbouring waters. Extended abstracts of the IBMANT/ANDEEP International Symposium & Workshop. J. A. C. S. Thatje, W.E. Arntz: 125–127.
- Corbera, J., & A. Ramos., (2005). Cumaceans from the Bellingshausen Sea and neighbouring waters. In: Thatje, S., J.A. Calcagno, & W.E. Arntz (eds.), Evolution of Antarctic Fauna/ Extended Abstracts of the IBMANT/ANDEEP International Symposium and Workshop in 2003.- Berichte zur Polar- und Meeresforschung [Reports on Polar and Marine Biology] 507:125–128.
- Corbera, J., & J.-C. Sorbe., (1999). The problematic cumacean Schizotrema atlanticum from the eastern Atlantic: redescription and ecological notes. Journal of Crustacean Biology 19 (1): 123–130.
- Corbera, J., & M.C. Sanz., (2004). Cumáceos y tanaidáceos. Pages 405–423, In: J.A. Barrientos (ed.), Curso Práctico de Entomología. Associación Española de Entomología - CIBIO - Univer. Autònoma de Barcelona, Bellaterra.
- Corbera, J., & M.J. Cardell., (1995a). Cumaceans as indicators of eutrophication on soft bottoms. Scientia Marina, 59 (Suppl. 1): 63–69.
- Corbera, J., & M.J. Cardell., (1995b). Los Cumáceos como indicadores de eutrofización en los fondos blandos. Pages 58–59, In: VIII Simposio Ibérico de Estudios del Bentos Marino, Blanes (Girona), 21–26 de Febrero de 1994. University of Barcelona.
- Corbera, J., & Martin., (2002). Two new cumacean species (Crustacea: Peracarida) from shallow waters off Thailand. Scientia Marina 66 (4): 407–415.
- Corbera, J., C. San Vicente, & J.-C. Sorbe., (2000). Small-scale distribution, life cycle and secondary production of Cumopsis goodsir in Creixell Beach (western Mediterranean). Journal of the Marine Biological Association of the United Kingdom 80 (2): 271–282.
- Corbera, J., C. San Vicente, & J.-C. Sorbe., (2009). Cumaceans (Crustacea) from the Bellingshausen Sea and off the western Antarctic Peninsula:a deep-water link with fauna of the surrounding oceans. Polar Biology 32: 611–622.
- Corbera, J., J.N. Fraga, & J.R.D. Díaz., (2003). Cumacea. Pages 73–74, In: Moro, L., J.L. Martín, M.J. Garrido, & I. Izquirdo (eds.), Lista de especies marinas de Canarias (algas, hongos, plantas y animales) 2003. Consejería de Política Territorial y Medio Ambiente del Gobierno de Canarias.
- Corbera J, Segonzac M, Cunha MR., (2008). A new deep-sea genus of Nannastacidae (Crustacea, Cumacea) from the Lucky Strike hydrothermal vent field (Azores Triple Junction, Mid-Atlantic Ridge). Marine Biology Research 4 (3): 180–192.
- Corbera, J., M.C. Brito, & J. Núñez., (2002). Interstitial cumaceans from sandy bottoms and Cymodocea meadows of the Canary Islands. Cahiers de Biologie Marine 43 (1): 63–71.
- Corbera, J., M.C. Brito, J. Núñez, & R. Riera., (2001). Catálogo de los cumáceos (Crustacea, Malacostraca) de las Islas Canarias [Catalogue of the cumacean species (Crustacea, Malacostraca) of the Canary Islands]. Revista de la Academia Canaria de Ciencias 12 (3–4) (2000): 67–73 (in Spanish with English summary).
- Corbera, J., Tirado, P. & Martin, D., (2005). Cumaceans (Crustacea: Peracarida) from the Persian Gulf. Zootaxa 1087: 1–31.
- Corey, S., (1969). The comparative life histories of three Cumacea (Crustacea): Cumopsis goodsiri (Van Beneden), Iphinoe trispinosa (Goodsir), and Pseudocuma longicornis (Bate). Canadian Journal of Zoology 47 (4): 695–704.
- Corey, S., (1970a). The quantitative distribution of three Cumacea (Crustacea, Peracarida) in Kames Bay, Scotland. Canadian Journal of Zoology 48 (5): 925–930.
- Corey, S., (1970b). The diurnal vertical migration of some Cumacea (Crustacea, Peracarida) in Kames Bay, Isle of Cumbrae, Scotland. Canadian Journal of Zoology 48 (6): 1385–1388.
- Corey, S., (1976a). The life history of Diastylis sculpta Sars, 1871 (Crustacea: Cumacea) in Passamaquoddy Bay, New Brunswick. Canadian Journal of Zoology 54 (5): 615–619.
- Corey, S., (1976b). Fecundity and release of young in Diastylis sculpta Sars (Crustacea, Cumacea). Canadian Journal of Zoology 54 (11): 1946–1949.
- Corey, S., (1981a). Distribution of certain Arctic and Subarctic Cumacea in Canadian waters. Canadian Journal of Zoology 59 (9):1725–1733.
- Corey, S., (1981b). Comparative fecundity and reproductive strategies in seventeen species of the Cumacea (Crustacea, Peracarida). Mar. Biol., 62: 65–72.
- Corey, S., (1983). The life history of Diastylis quadrispinosa (Sars, 1871) (Crustacea: Cumacea) in Passamaquoddy Bay, New Brunswick. Canadian Journal of Zoology 61 (1): 108–111.
- Corey, S., (1984). The comparative fecundity of two species of Cumacea from the shallow waters of Florida. Canadian Journal of Zoology 62: 514–515.
- Cornet, M., J.-P. Lissalde, J.-M. Bouchet, J.-C. Sorbe, & L. Amoureux., (1983). Données qualitatives sur le benthos et le suprabenthos d´un transect du plateau continental sud-Gascogne. Cahiers de Biologie Marine 24 (1): 69–84.
- Cosson, N., M. Sibuet, & J. Galeron., (1997). Community structure and spatial heterogeneity of the deep-sea macrofauna at three contrasting stations in the tropical northeast Atlantic. Deep-Sea Research Part I 44 (2): 247–269.
- Costa, S., (1960). Recherches sur les fonds a Halarachnion spatulatum de la baie de Marseille. Vie et Milieu 11 (1): 1–68.
- Cotelli, F., & C. Lora Lamia Donin., (1980). The spermatozoon of Peracarida II. The spermatozoon of Tanaidacea. Journal of Ultrastructure Research 73: 263–268.
- Crandall, M.E., (1977). Epibenthic invertebrates of Croton Bay in the Hudson River. New York Fish and Game Journal 24 (2): 178–186.
- Cristescu, M.E.A., P.D.N. Hebert, & T.M. Onciu., (2003). Phylogeography of Ponto-Caspian crustaceans:a benthic- planktonic comparison. Molecular Ecology 12: 985–996.
- Crooks, J.A., (1998). Habitat alteration and community-level effects of an exotic mussel, Musculista senhousia. Marine Ecology Progress Series 162: 137–152.
- Crothers, J.H., (1966). Dale Fort Marine Fauna, Second Edition. Field Studies Council, London.
- Cruz, S., S. Gamito, & J.C. Marques., (2003). Spatial distribution of peracarids in the intertidal zone of the Ria Formosa (Portugal). Crustaceana 76 (4): 411–431.
- Cunha, M.R., J.C. Sorbe, & C. Bernardes., (1997a). On the structure of the neritic suprabenthic communities from the Portuguese continental margin. Marine Ecology Progress Series 157: 119–137.
- Cunha, M.R., J.C. Sorbe, & C. Bernardes., (1997b). On the structure of the coastal suprabenthic communities from the continental shelf off Aveiro (NW Portugal). Arquivos do Museu Bocage (N.S.) 3 (3): 165–188.
- Cunha, M.R., J.C. Sorbe, & M.H. Moreira., (1999). Spatial and seasonal changes of brackish peracaridan assemblages and their relation to some environmental variables in two tidal channels of the Ria de Aveiro (NW Portugal). Marine Ecology Progress Series 190: 69–87.
- Cunha, M.R., N. Peralta, M.J. Amaral, V. Blinova, & A. Ravara., (2003). Biological surveys of the Lucky Strike segment (MAR) and the Atlantis Seamount. Preliminary results of TTR-12 cruise in the Azores area (Leg 5). IOC Workshop Report 187: 22–23.
- Cúrdia, J., S. Carvalho, A. Ravara, J.D. Gage, A.M. Rodrigues, & V. Quintino., (2004). Deep macrobenthic communities from Nazaré Submarine Canyon (NW Portugal). Scientia Marina 68 (Suppl. 1): 171–180.
- Czerniavsky, V., (1868). Suborder Schizopoda. Pages 66–68, In: Czerniavsky, V., Materialia ad zoographiam ponticam comparatam 1. St. Petersburg (in Russian, description in Latin) (1 plate).

== D ==
- Dahl, E., (1983a). Alternatives in malacostracan evolution. Pages 1–5, In: Lowry, J.K. (ed.), Papers from the Conference on the Biology and Evolution of Crustacea, Held at the Australian Museum Sydney, 1980. Trustees of the Australian Museum, Sydney, NSW, Australia.
- Dahl, E., (1983b). Malacostracan phylogeny and evolution. Pages 189–211, In: Schram, F.R. (ed.), Crustacean Issues. Crustacean Phylogeny, 1. A.A. Balkema, Rotterdam, Netherlands.
- Dahl, E., L. Laubier, M. Sibuet, & J.-O. Strömberg., (1976). Some quantitative results on benthic communities of the deep Norwegian Sea. Astarte 9: 61–79.
- Dahl, F., (1893). Untersuchungen über die Thierwelt der Unterelbe. Pages 149–187, In: In: Sechster Bericht der Commission zur Wissenschaftlichen Untersuchung der Deutschen Meere, in Kiel für die Jahre 1887 bis 1891. XVII. bis XXI. Jahrgang. III. Heft. Paul Parey, Berlin.
- Dalcourt, M.-F., P. Béland, E. Pelletier, & Y. Vigneault., (1992). Caractérisation des communautés benthiques et étude des contaminants dans des aires fréquentées par le Béluga du Saint-Laurent. Rapport Technique Canadien des Sciences Halieutiques et Aquatiques, No. 1845: 1–86.
- Dalla Torre, K.W., (1889). Die Fauna von Helgoland. Zoologische Jahrbücher. Supplementheft 2: 1–99.
- Dana, J.D., (1852). Crustacea, Part I. United States Exploring Expedition during the years 1838, 1839, 1840, 1841, 1842 under the command of Charles Wilkes, U.S.N. 13: 502.
- Daniels, R.A., (1982). Feeding ecology of some fishes of the Antarctic Peninsula.- Fishery Bulletin 80: 575–588.
- Dauvin, J.-C., (1983). Nouvelles espèces pour l´inventaire de la faune marine de Roscoff: annelides polychètes et crustacés amphipodes et cumacés. Travaux de la Station Biologique de Roscoff 29: 5–8.
- Dauvin, J.-C., (1988). Bilan des additions aux Inventaires de la faune marine de Roscoff a partir des observations effectuées de 1977 a 1987 en baie de Morlaix avec la signalisation de deux nouvelles espèces d´Amphipodes pour la faune: Ampelisca spooneri Dauvin et Bellan-Santini et Scopelocheirus hopei Costa. Cahiers de Biologie Marine 29 (3): 419–426.
- Dauvin, J.-C., & F. Gentil., (1979). Crustacés Péracarides (Cumacés, Amphipodes) nouveaux pour l´inventaire de la faune marine de Roscoff. Travaux de la Station Biologique de Roscoff 25: 7–9.
- Dauvin, J.-C., & S. Zouhiri., (1994). Nouvelles espèces pour l´inventaire de la faune marine de Roscoff. Crustacés Amphipodes et Cumacés [New species for the marine fauna list of Roscoff. Amphipod and cumacean crustaceans]. Cahiers de Biologie Marine 35 (3): 369–371.
- Dauvin, J.-C., & S. Zouhiri., (1996). Suprabenthic crustacean fauna of a dense Ampelisca community from the English Channel. Journal of the Marine Biological Association of the United Kingdom 76 (4): 909–929.
- Dauvin, J.-C., A. Iglesias, & F. Gentil., (1991). Nouvelles espèces pour l´Inventaire de la Fauna Marine de Roscoff - Crustacés Amphipodes, Cumacés et Décapodes, Mollusques Gastéropodes et Ascidies. Cahiers Biologie Marine 32: 121–128.
- Dauvin, J.-C., C. Vallet, P. Mouny, & S. Zouhiri., (2000). Main characteristics of the boundary layer macrofauna in the English Channel. Hydrobiologia 426 (1–3): 139–156.
- Dauvin, J.-C., J.C. Sorbe, & J.C. Lorgeré., (1995). Benthic Boundary Layer macrofauna from the upper continental slope and the Cap Ferret canyon (Bay of Biscay). Oceanologica Acta 18: 113–122.
- Dauvin, J.-C., N. Desroy, L. Denis, & T. Ruellet., (2008). Does the Phaeocystis bloom affect the diel migration of the suprabenthos community. Marine Pollution Bulletin 56 (1): 77–87.
- Davoult, D., (1988). Note sur la reproduction et l´écologie du Cumacé Cumopsis goodsiri (van Beneden, 1861). Bulletin de la Société Zoologique de France 113 (3): 285–292.
- Dawson, C.E., (1966). Additions to the known marine fauna of Grand Isle, Louisiana. Proceedings of the Louisiana Academy of Sciences 29: 175–180.
- Dawson, E., (1979). Catalogue of type specimens in the New Zealand Oceanographic Institute.- New Zealand Oceanographic Institute Memoir 76: 5–110.
- Day, J., (1975). South African Cumacea, Part 1: Family Bodotriidae, subfamily Vaunthompsoniinae. Annals of the South African Museum 66 (9): 177–220.
- Day, J., (1978a). South African Cumacea, Part 2: Family Bodotriidae, subfamily Bodotriinae. Annals of the South African Museum 75 (7): 159–290.
- Day, J., (1978b). South African Cumacea, Part 3: Families Lampropidae and Ceratocumatidae. Annals of the South African Museum 76 (3): 137–189.
- Day, J., (1980). South African Cumacea, Part 4: Families Gynodiastylidae and Diastylidae. Annals of the South African Museum 82 (6): 187–292.
- Day, J.A., (1982). South African Cumacea. Zoological Society of Southern Africa Occasional Bulletin No. 2 1982: 90–?.
- Day, J.H., (1959). The biology of Langebaan Lagoon: a study of the effect of shelter from wave action. Transactions of the Royal Society of Africa 35: 475–548.
- Day, J.H., (1974). The ecology of Morrumbene estuary, Moçambique. Transactions of the Royal Society of South Africa 41 (1): 43–96.
- Day, J.H., J.G. Field, & M.J. Penrith., (1970). The benthic fauna and fishes of False Bay, South Africa. Transactions of the Royal Society of South Africa 39 (1): 1–108.
- Day, J.H., N.A.H. Millard, & A.D. Harrison., (1952). The ecology of South African Estuaries: Part III Knysna: A clear open estuary. Transactions of the Royal Society of South Africa 33 (3): 367–412.
- Day, J.W., W.G. Smith, P.R. Wagner, & W.C. Stowe., (1973). Community Structure and Carbon Budget of a Salt Marsh and Shallow bay Estuarine System in Louisiana. Center for Wetland Research, Louisiana State University, Baton Rouge, Louisiana (Publication # LSU-SG-72–04).
- De Broyer, C., & K. Jazdzewski. 1993 (1996). Biodiversity of the Southern Ocean: towards a new synthesis for the Amphipoda (Crustacea). Bollettino del Museo Civico di Storia Naturale di Verona 20: 547–568.
- De La Cruz, E., & J.A. Vargas., (1987). Abundancia y distribucion vertical de la meiofauna de la playa fangosa de Punta Morales, Golfo de Nicoya, Costa Rica. Revista de Biología Tropical 35 (2): 363–367.
- De Souza Braga, F.M. & M.A.A. De Souza Braga., (1987). Estudo do hábito alimentar de Prionotus punctatus (Bloch, 1797) (Teleostei, Triglidae), na região da Ilha Anchieta, Estado de São Paulo, Brasil. Revista Brasileira de Biologia 47 (1–2): 31–36.
- De Troch, M., J. Mees, & E. Wakhabi., (1998). Diets of abundant fishes from beach seine catches in seagrass beds of a tropical bay (Gazi Bay, Kenya). Belgian Journal of Zoology 128 (2): 135–154.
- Dearborn, J.H., (1967). Stanford University Invertebrate Studies in the Ross Sea 1958–61: General account and station list. Pages 31–47, In: Bullivant, J.S., & J.H. Dearborn (eds.), The Fauna of the Ross Sea. Part 5. General Accounts, Station Lists, and Benthic Ecology. New Zealand Department of Scientific and Industrial Research Bulletin 176.
- Deidun, A., & P.J. Schembri., (2006). Composition of the nocturnal motile fauna from the upper infralittoral fringe of sandy beaches in the Maltese islands: are there any implications for conservation? [Composizione della fauna vagile notturna della frangia infralitorale delle spiagge sabbiose delle isole Maltesi:possibili implicazioni per la conservazione]- Biologia Marina Mediterranea 13 (1): 355–363.
- Demel, K., (1925). Zbiorowiska zwierzece na dnie morza polskiego. Contribution à la connaissance de la faune benthique dans les eaux polonaises de la Baltique. Bulletin international de l'Académie Polonaise des Sciences et des Lettres. Series B- Sciences Naturelles 1925: 967–977.
- Demel, K., (1935). Studja nad fauna denna i jej rozsiedleniem w polskich wodach Baltyku. Archives d´Hydrobiologie et d´Ichtyologie 9: 239–311.
- Demir, M., (1952). Bogaz ve Adalar Sahillerinin Omurgasiz Dip Hayvanlari. Istanbul Üniversitesi Fen Fakültesi Hydrobiologi Arastirma Enstitüsü Yayiinlarindan, Ser. B, 3: 1–615.
- Deniel, C., (1974). Régime alimentaire des jeunes turbots Scophthalmus maximus L. de la classe 0 dans leur milieu naturel. Cahiers de Biologie Marine 15: 551–566.
- Dennell, R., (1936). The feeding mechanism of the cumacean crustacean Diastylis bradyi. Transactions of the Royal Society of Edinburgh 58 (1): 125–142.
- Dennell, R., (1937). On the feeding mechanism of Apseudes talpa, and the evolution of the peracaridan feeding mechanism. Transactions of the Royal Society of Edinburgh 59: 57–78.
- Derzhavin, V., (1912). Neue Cumacean aus dem Kaspischen Meere. Zoologischen Anzeiger 34 (8/9 vom 26): 273–284.
- Derzhavin, A.N., (1923). Malacostraca presnih vod Kamciatki = Kaspische Malacostraca in der Flussfauna des Südlichen Kaspisses [Malacostraca der Süßwasser-Gewässer von Kamtschatka. Russische Hydrobiologische Zeitschrift 2: 180-194 (Plates I-VII).
- Derzhavin, A.N., (1925). Materials of the Ponto-Azoph carcinofauna. (Mysidacea, Cumacea, Amphipoda). Russische Hydrobiologische Zeitschrift 4 (1-2): 10-35.
- Derzhavin, A.N., (1926a). The Cumacea of the Kamchatka Expedition. Russ. Hydrobiol. Zhurn. 5 (7–9): 174–182
- Derzhavin, A.N., (1926b). The fresh-water Malacostraca of the Russian Far East. Russkii Gidrobiologicheskii Zhurnal 9: 5- 8.
- Derzhavin, A.N., (1929). Arctic elements in the fauna of peracarids of the Sea of Japan. Russische Hydrobiologische Zeitschrift 8 (10-12): 326-329.
- Derzhavin, A.N., (1951). Otriad Cumovîie (Cumacea). Vol. Jivotnîi mir Azerbaidjana. Izvestiia Akademii Nauk Azerbzhanskoi SSR:451-453.
- Desbruyères, D., A. Guille, & J. Ramos., (1972). 73. Bionomie benthique du plateau continental de la côte Catalane Espagnole. Vie et Milieu 23 (ser. 2B): 335-363.
- Desbruyères, D., J.W. Deming, A. Dinet, & A. Khripounoff., (1985). Réactions de l´écosystème benthique profond aux perturbations:nouveaux résultats éxperimentaux. Pages 193-208, In: Laubier, L., & C. Monniot (eds.), Peuplements Profonds du Golfe de Gascogne/ Campagnes BIOGAS. IFREMER, Brest.
- Desmarest, A.G., (1823). Malacostracés. Pages 138-425, In: Dictionnaire des Sciences Naturelles: Dans Lequel on Traite Méthodiquement des Différens Êtres de la Nature, Considérés Soit en Eux-Mêmes, d´après l´État Actuel de nos Connaissances, Soit Relativement à l´Utilité qu´en Peuvent Retirer la Médecine, l´Agriculture, le Commerce et les Arts; Suivie d´une Biographie des Plus Célèbres Naturalistes, Vol. 28. Strasbourg, Paris.
- Desmarest, A.-G., (1825). Considérations Générales sur la Classe des Crustacés. F.G. Levrault, Libraire, Strasbourg.
- Dewicke, A., V. Rottiers, J. Mees, & M. Vincx., (2002). Evidence for an enriched hyperbenthic fauna in the Frisian front (North Sea). Journal of Sea Research 47: 121-139.
- Dexter, D.M., (1969). Structure of an intertidal sandy-beach community in North Carolina. Chesapeake Science 10 (2): 93- 98.
- Dexter, D.M., (1974). Sandy-beach fauna of the Pacific and Atlantic coasts of Costa Rica and Colombia. Revista de Biología Tropical 22 (1): 51-66.
- Dexter, D.M., (1979). Community structure and seasonal variation in intertidal Panamanian sandy beaches. Estuarine and Coastal Marine Science 9 (5): 543-558.
- Dexter, D.M., (1983). Soft bottom infaunal communities in Mission Bay. California Fish and Game 69 (1): 5-17.
- Dexter, D.M., (1988). The sandy beach fauna of Portugal. Arquivos do Museu Bocage. Nova Série 1 (8): 101-110.
- Dexter, D.M., (1990). The effect of exposure and seasonality on sandy beach community structure in Portugal. Ciência Biológica, Ecology and Systematics 10 (1/2): 31-50.
- Dexter, D.M., (1992). Soft bottom invertebrates of the Portuguese benthos. Bol. Inst. Nac. Invest. Pescas 17: 61-88.
- Diaz-Castañeda, V., & C. Almeda-Jauregui., (1999). Early benthic organism colonization on a Caribbean coral reef (Barbados, West Indies):a plate experimental approach. P.S.Z.N.: Marine Ecology, 20 (3-4): 197-220.
- Dixon, A.Y., (1944). Notes on certain aspects of the biology of Cumopsis goodsiri (Van Beneden) and some other cumaceans in relation to their environment. Journal of the Marine Biological Association of the United Kingdom, N.S. 26: 61-71.
- Dohle, W., (1970). Die Bildung und Differenzierung des postnauplial Keimstreifs von Diastylis rathkei (Crustacea, Cumacea): I. Die Bildung der Teloblasten und ihrer Derivate. Z. Morph. Tiere 67: 307–392.
- Dohle, W., (1972). Über die Bildung und Differenzierung des postnauplialen Keimstreifs von Leptochelia spec. (Crustacea, Tanaidacea). Zoologische Jahrbücher, Abteilung für Anatomie und Ontogenie der Tiere 89: 503-566.
- Dohle W., (1976). Die Bildung und Differenzierung des postnauplialen Keimstreifs von Diastylis rathkei (Crustacea, Cumacea). II. Die Differenzierung und Musterbildung des Ektoderms. Zoomorphologie 84: 235–277.
- Dohle, W., & G. Scholtz., (1988). Clonal analysis of the crustacean segment: the discordance between genealogical and segmental borders. Development (Supplement) 104: 147-160.
- Dohrn, A., (1869). (1870). Untersuchungen über Bau und Entwickelung der Cumaceen. Jenaische Zeitschrift für Medicin und Naturwissenschaft 5: 54-81 (Plates II-III).
- Dohrn, A., (1870a). Untersuchungen über Bau und Entwicklung der Arthropoden. 7. Zur Kenntnis vom Bau und der Entwicklung von Tanais. Jenaische Zeitschrift für Medizin und Naturwissenshaft, herausgegeben von der Medizinisch- Naturwissenschaftlichen Gesellschaft zu Jena 5: 293-306.
- Dohrn, A., (1870b). Untersuchungen über Bau und Entwicklung der Arthropoden. 8. Die Überreste des Zoea-Stadiums in der ontogenetischen Entwicklung der verschiedenen Crustaceen-Familien. Jenaische Zeitschrift für Medicin und Naturwissenschaft 5: 471-491.
- Dojiri, M., & J. Sieg., (1997). 3. The Tanaidacea. Pages 181-278 In: Blake, J.A., & P.H. Scott (eds.), Taxonomic Atlas of the Benthic Fauna of the Santa Maria Basin and Western Santa Barbara Channel. Volume 11. The Crustacea Part 2. The Isopoda, Cumacea and Tanaidacea. Santa Barbara Museum of Natural History, Santa Barbara, CA.
- Donath-Hernández, F.E., (1987a). Nuevos registros y ampliacion de rango geografico de cuatro especies de cumaceos para el Golfo de California (Crustacea, Cumacea) [First record and enlargement of geographic distribution of four species of Cumacea for the Gulf of California (Crustacea, Cumacea). Ciencias Marinas 13 (1): 70-74.
- Donath-Hernández, F.E., (1987b). Distribucion de los Cumaceos (Crustacea, Peracarida) de la Bahia de Todos Santos, Baja California, Mexico [Distribution of the Cumacea (Crustacea, Peracarida) of the Bahia de Todos Santos, Baja California, Mexico]. Ciencias Marinas 13 (1): 35-52
- Donath-Hernandez, F., (1988a). Cumacea from the Gulf of Mexico and the Caribbean Sea (Crustacea, Peracarida). I: Descriptions of known species, new records and range extensions. Caribbean Journal of Science 24: 44–51.
- Donath-Hernandez, F., (1988b). Three new species of Cumacea from the Gulf of California. Cahier Biologie Marina 29: 531–543.
- Donath-Hernández, F.E., (1992). Cumella (Cumewingia) siankaana n.sp. from the Caribbean coast of Quintana Roo, México (Cumacea, Nannastacidae). Pages 163-165, In: Navarro, D., & E. Suárez-Morales (eds.), Diversidad Biológica en la Reserva de la Biosfera de Sian Ka´an, Quintana Roo, México. Vol. II. Centro de Investigaciones de Quintana Roo, Chetumal, Quintana Roo, México.
- Donath-Hernández, F.E., (1993). Cumaceos de Bahia de Los Angeles, Baja California, Mexico (Crustacea, Peracarida) [The Cumacea of Bahia de Los Angeles, Baja California, Mexico (Crustacea, Peracarida). Ciencias Marinas 19 (4): 461-471.
- Dos Santos, M. F. L. and A. M. S. Pires-Vanin, (1999). The Cumacea community of the southeastern Brazilian Continental Shelf: structure and dynamics. Scientia Marina 63 (1): 15–25.
- Drake, P., & A.M. Arias., (1997). Effect of aquaculture practices on the benthic macroinvertebrate community of a lagoon system in the Bay of Cádiz (southwestern Spain). Estuaries 20 (4): 677-688.
- Drake, P., A.M. Arias, & M. Conradi., (1997). Aportación al conocimiento de la macrofauna supra y epibentónica de los caños mareales de la bahía de Cádiz (España) [Contribution to the knowledge of the hyperbenthic and epibenthic macrofauna of the tidal channels of the Bay of Cádiz (southern Spain)]. Publicaciones Especiales del Instituto Español de Oceanografía 23: 133-141.
- Drazen, J.C., T.W. Buckley, & G.R. Hoff., (2001). The feeding habits of slope dwelling macrourid fishes in the eastern North Pacific. Deep-Sea Research (Part I, Oceanographic Research Papers) 48(3): 909-935.
- Dudich, E., (1931). Systematische und biologische Untersuchungen über die Kalkeinlagerungen des Crustaceenpanzers im polarisierten Lichte. Zoologica, Stuttgart 80: 1-154.
- Dumont, H.J., (2000). Endemism in the Ponto-Caspian Fauna, with special emphasis on the Onychopoda (Crustacea). Advances in Ecological Research 31: 181-196.
- Duncan, T.K., (1981). Life history and ecology of Almyracuma proximoculi Jones and Burbanck, 1959 (Crustacea: Cumacea). Ph.D. dissertation, Boston University, Massachusetts, USA.
- Duncan, T.K., (1983). Sexual dimorphism and reproductive behavior in Almyracuma proximoculi (Crustacea: Cumacea):the effect of habitat. Biological Bulletin 165: 370-378.
- Duncan, T.K., (1984). Life history of Almyracuma proximoculi Jones and Burbanck, 1959 (Crustacea: Cumacea) from intertidal fresh-water springs on Cape Cod, Massachusetts. Journal of Crustacean Biology 4 (3): 356-374.
- Dutra, G.F., G.R. Allen, T. Werner, and S. A. McKenna., (2005). A rapid marine biodiversity assessment of the Abrolhos Bank, Bahia, Brazil. RAP Bulletin of Biological Assessment 38: 3-160.

== E ==
- Eales, N.B., (1939). The Littoral Fauna of Great Britain. A Handbook for Collectors. Cambridge University Press.
- Edgar, G.J., & D.W. Klumpp., (2003). Consistencies over regional scales in assemblages of mobile epifauna associated with natural and artificial plants of different shape. Aquatic Botany 75: 275–291.
- Edwards, R., & J.H. Steele., (1968). The ecology of 0–group plaice and common dabs at Loch Ewe/ I. Population and food. Journal of Experimental Marine Biology and Ecology 2: 215–238.
- Ehrenbaum, E., (1896). VIII. Die Cumaceen und Schizopoden von Helgoland. Nebst neueren Beobachtungen über ihr Vorkommen in der deutschen Bucht und in der Nordsee. Wissenschaftliche Meeresuntersuchungen N.F., 2 (1, Abt. 1): 403–435.
- Ekman, S., (1935). Tiergeographie des Meeres. Leipzig, Akad. Verlangsanst., xii + 542pp.
- Ekman, S., (1953). Zoogeography of the Sea (translated from Swedish by E. Palmer). Sidgwick & Jackson, London.
- Elias, R., J.R. Palacios, M.S. Rivero, & E.A. Vallarino., (2005). Short-term responses to sewage discharge and storms of subtidal san-bottom macrozoobenthic assemblages off Mar del Plata City, Argentina (SW Atlantic). Journal of Sea Research 53: 231–242.
- Elizalde M., O. Weber, & J.-C. Sorbe., (1993). Influence des caractères sédimentologiques sur la distribution des Crustacés benthiques de la pente Atlantique (Golfe de Gascogne; marge sud du canyon du Cap-Ferret). Pages 269–273, In: Actes IIIe Colloque International d´Océanographie du Golfe de Gascogne.
- Elizalde, M., J.C. Sorbe, & J.C. Dauvin., (1993). Las comunidades suprabentónicas bathiales del golfo de Vizcaya (margen sur del Cañón de Cap-Ferret): composición faunística y estructura. Pages 247–258, In: Publicaciones Especiales del Instituto Español de Océanografia No. 11.
- Elliott, B., S. Degraer, M. Bursey, & M. Vincx., (1997). Intertidal zonation of macroinfauna on a dissipative, sandy beach at De Panne (Belgium): a pilot study.- Biol. Jaarb. Dodonaea 64: 92–108.
- Elmhirst, R., (1930). 1931. XXI.- Studies in the Scottish marine fauna. The Crustacea of the sandy and muddy areas of the tidal zone. Proceedings of the Royal Society of Edinburgh 51: 169–175.
- Elofsson, R., & E. Dahl., (1970). The optic neuropiles and chiasmata of Crustacea. Zeitschrift für Zellforschung und Mikroskopische Anatomie 107: 343–360.
- Elouard, B., G. Desrosiers, J.C. Brêthes, & Y. Vigneault., (1983). Étude de l´habitat du Poisson autour des ilots créés par des déblais de dragage; lagune de Grande-Entrée, Îles-de-la-Madeleine. Rapp. Tech. Can. Sci. Halieut. Aquat. 1209: 1–69.
- Enright, J.T., (1962). Responses of an amphipod to pressure changes. Comparative Biochemistry and Physiology 7: 131–145.
- Escobar-Briones, E., & S.T. Cruz., (2004). El papel de la exportación de carbono biogénico sobre los patrones de distribución de crustáceos meiofaunales batiales: cuenca de Santa Cruz y depresión de San Diego. Contribuciones al Estudio de los Crustáceos del Pacifico Este 3: 99–116.
- Escobar-Briones, E., & S. Tamez., (2006). Variación espacial de la densidad de crustáceos de la meiofauna en fondos con infiltraciones naturales de metano de la zona batial en la curnca de San Clemente, Pacifico Oriental. Pages 85–100, In: Hendrickx, M.E. (ed.) Contribuciones al Estudio de los Crustaceos del Pacifico Este 4 (1), Universidad Nacional Autonoma de Mexico, Mazatlan.

== F ==
- Fabricius, J. C., (1779). Reise nach Norwegen mit Bemerkungen aus der Naturhistorie und Ökonomie. Hamburg.
- Fage, L., (1923). Remarques sur la biologie de quelques Cumacés des côtes de France. Assoc. Française pour Avanc. des Sciences 1923: 545-549.
- Fage, L., (1924). A propos d'une espèce nouvelle du Genre Heterocuma. Bulletin of the Museum of Histoire Naturelle in Paris 30: 364–367.
- Fage, L., (1928a). Cumacés de la côte atlantique du Maroc. Bulletin of the Museum d'Histoire Naturelle in Paris.
- Fage, L., (1928b). Voyage de la goélette "Mélita" au Sénégal (1889–1890). Bull. Suz. Zool. France 53 (331–339).
- Fage, L., (1928c). La distribution géographique des Cumacés dans la zone côtière du n.-w. Africain. Compte Rendu Sommaire des Séances de la Société de Biogéographie, No. 41, 5: 60-64.
- Fage, L., (1929). Cumacés et Leptostracés provenant des campagnes du Prince Albert Ier De Monaco. Résultats des Campagnes Scientifiques Accomplies Sur Son Yacht 77: 3–47.
- Fage, L., (1932). La répartition des Cumacés dans les zones profondes et côtiers de l´Est-Atlantique. 65e Congrès Soc. Savantes, Paris, 205-208.
- Fage, L., (1933). Pêches planctoniques à la lumière effectuées à Banyuls-sur-Mer et à Concarneau. III. Crustacés. Archives de Zoologie Expérimentale et Générale 76 (3): 105-248.
- Fage, L., (1940). Les cumacés de la Méditerranée remarques systématiques et biologiques. Bulletin de L'Institut Océanographique 783: 1–14.
- Fage, L., (1944). XII Sur quelques caractères sexuels secondaires des Cumacés du genre Iphinoë. Archives de Zoologie Expérimentale et Générale 83 (3): 112-121
- Fage, L., (1945). Les Cumacés du plancton nocturne des côtes d'Annam. Archives do Zoologie Expérimentale et Générale 84: 165–223.
- Fage, L., (1950). Sur un nouveau Cumacé de la côte occidentale d'Afrique Eocuma cadenati nov. sp. Bulletin of the Museum of Histoire Naturelle in Paris 22 (4): 450–451.
- Fage, L., (1951a). Cumacés. Faune de France 54: 1–136.
- Fage, L., (1951b). Cumacés. Volume 3 (1), In: Expédition Océanographique Belge dans les Eaux Côtières Africaines de l´Atlantique Sud (1948–1949)/ Résultats Scientifiques. Institut Royal des Sciences Naturelles de Belgique, Bruxelles.
- Fage, L., (1952). Cumacés. Résultats Scientifiques 3: 3–10.
- Fage, L., & R. Lux., (1938). Remarques préliminaires à l´etude de la microfaune benthique en Mediterranée. 71e Conr. Soc. Savantes:315.
- Fairchild, E.A., J. Fleck, & H. Howell., (2005). Determining an optimal release site for juvenile winter flounder Pseudopleuronectes americanus (Walbaum) in the Great Bay Estuary, NH, USA. Aquaculture Research 36: 1374- 1383.
- Fanelli, E., J.E. Cartes, F. Badalamenti, P. Rumolo, & M. Sprovieri., (2009). Trophodynamics of suprabenthic fauna on coastal muddy bottoms of the southern Tyrrhenian Sea (western Mediterranean). Journal of Sea Research 61 (3): 174-187.
- Farran, G.P., (1914). (1915). Results of a biological survey of Blacksod Bay, Co. Mayo. Fisheries, Ireland, Scientific Investigations 3: 1-72.
- Farrell, D.H., (1979). Benthic molluscan and crustacean communities in Louisiana. Rice University Studies 65 (4-5): 401- 436.
- Fenton, G.E. in Lowry, J.k. & Stoddart, H.E., (2003). Crustacea: Malacostraca: Peracarida: Amphipoda, Cumacea, Mysidacea. In Beesley, P.L. & Houston, W.W.K. (eds) Zoological Catalogue of Australia. Vol. 19.2B. Melbourne : CSIRO Publishing, Australia xii 531 pp.
- Fernández, J., (1996). Noticia de nuevos táxones para la ciencia en el ámbito íbero-balear y Macaronésico. Nuevos táxones animales descritos en la Peninsula Ibérica y Macaronesia entre 1994 y 1997. Graellsia 51: 163-215.
- Ferraris, J.D., (1982). Surface zooplankton at Carrie Bow Cay, Belize. Pages 143-151, In: Rützler, K., & I.G. Macintyre (eds.), The Atlantic Barrier Reef Ecosystem at Carrie Bow Cay, Belize, I/ Structure and Communities.- Smithsonian Contributions in Marine Science No. 12.
- Ferraton, F., M. Harmelin-Vivien, C. Mellon-Duval, & A. Souplet., (2007). Spatio-temporal variation in diet may affect condition and abundance of juvenile European hake in the Gulf of Lions (NW Mediterranean). Marine Ecology Progress Series 337: 197-208.
- Fetzer, I., (2004). Reproduction strategies and distribution of larvae and juveniles of benthic soft-bottom invertebrates in the Kara Sea (Russian Arctic). Berichte Zur Polar- und Meeresforschung 496: I-IX, 11-242.
- Figueiredo, G.M. de, and J.P. Vieira., (1998). Cronologia alimentar e dieta da corvina, Micropogonias furnieri, no estuário da Lagoa Dos Patos, RS, Brasil. Atlântica 20: 55-72.
- Filchakov, V.A., (1995). [Order Cumacea.] Pages 162-164 (Plates 154-157), In: Alekseev, V.R. (ed.), Opredelitel Presnovodnyky Bespozvonochnykh Rossii i Sopredelnykh Territorii. Tom 2:Rakoobraznye [Key to Freshwater Invertebrates of Russia and Adjacent Lands. Volume 2:Crustacea]. Zoologicheskii Institut Rossiiskoi Akademii Nauk, Sankt-Petersburg.
- Filgueiras, V.L., L.S. Campos, H.P. Lavrado, R. Frensel, & R.C.G. Pollery., (2007). Vertical distribution of macrobenthic infauna from the shallow sublittoral zone of Admiralty Bay, King George Island, Antarctica. Polar Biology 30: 1439-1447.
- Fincham, A.A., (1974). Intertidal sand-dwelling peracarid fauna of Stewart Island, New Zealand. Journal of Marine and Freshwater Research 8 (1): 1-14.
- Fischer, P., (1872a). Pages 47, 110, In: de Folin, L., & L. Perier, Les Fonds de la mer, étude internationale sur les particularités nouvelles des régions sous-marines, commencée et dirigée Vol. 2 (1). Savy, Paris.
- Fischer, (1872b). Catalogue des Crustacés podophtalmaires et Cirripèdes du Département de la Gironde. Actes de la Société Linnéenne de Bordeaux 28: 22–24.
- Fish, C.J., (1925). Seasonal distribution of the plankton in the Woods Hole Region. Bulletin of the United States Bureau of Fisheries 1925 (1926), No. 974, 41: 91-179.
- Fish, C.J., & M.W. Johnson., (1937). The biology of the zooplankton population in the bay of Fundy and gulf of Maine with special reference to production and distribution. Journal of the Biological Board of Canada 3 (3): 189-322.
- Flint, R.W., & J.A. Younk., (1983). Estuarine benthos: Long-term community structure variations, Corpus Christi Bay, Texas. Estuaries 6 (2): 126-141.
- Flint, R.W., & J.S. Holland., (1980). Benthic infaunal variability on a transect in the Gulf of Mexico. Estuarine and Coastal Marine Science 10: 1-14.
- Forsman, B., (1938a). Untersuchungen über die Cumaceen des Skageraks. Zoologiska Bidrag från Uppsala 18: 1–161, plates 1–3.
- Forsman, B., (1938b). Faunistische und biologische studien über nordische Cumaceen. Vorläufige Mitteilung. Zoologischer Anzeiger 121 (3–4): 59–66, figure 1.
- Forsman, B., (1940). Smärre undersökningar över Öresund 8. Cumacéer från Öresund. Kungl. Fysiografiska Sällskapets i Lund Förhandlingar 10 (19): 1-9.
- Forsman, B., (1956). Notes on the invertebrate fauna of the Baltic. Arkiv för Zoologi, N.S., 9 (17): 389-419.
- Forsstrand, C., (1886). Det Arktiska Hafsområdets Djurgeografiska Begränsning med Ledning af Skalkräftornas (Crustacea Malacostraca) Utbredning. Almqvist & J. Wiksell, Upsala.
- Fowler, H.W., (1912). Part II. The Crustacea of New Jersey. Annual Report of the New Jersey State Museum 1911: 29-650 (150 plates).
- Fox, R.S., & E.E. Ruppert., (1985). Shallow-Water Marine Benthic Macroinvertebrates of South Carolina/ Species Identification, Community Composition, and Symbiotic Associations. University of South Carolina Press, Columbia.
- Foxon, G.E.H., (1932). Report on stomatopod larvae, Cumacea and Cladocera. Sci. Rep. Great Barrier Reef Exped. 4: 375–398
- Foxon, G.E.H., (1936). Notes on the natural history of certain sand-dwelling Cumacea. Ann. Mag. Nat. Hist. 10 (7): 377–393.
- Fraenkel, K.L., (1915). [Die Choniostomatiden bei Cumaceen der Murmanküste]. Petrograd Trav. Lab. Zool. 4: 173-196.
- Franca, S., C. Vinagre, M.J. Costa, & H.N. Cabral., (2004). Use of the coastal areas adjacent to the Douro estuary as a nursery area for pouting, Trisopterus luscus Linnaeus, 1758. Journal of Applied Ichthyology 20 (2): 99-104.
- Franz, V., (1910). Ueber die Ernährungsweise einiger Nordseefische, besonders der Scholle. Wissenschaftliche Meeresuntersuchungen Series 2, 9: 197-215.
- Freeman, S. M., C.A. Richardson, & R. Seed., (2001). Seasonal abundance, spatial distribution, spawning and growth of Astropecten irregularis (Echinodermata: Asteroidea). Estuarine, Coastal and Shelf Science 53: 39-49.
- Fricke, H., (1931). Die Komplexaugen von Diastylis rathkei. Zoologische Jahrbücher Abteilung für Anatomie und Ontogenie der Tiere 53: 701-724.
- Froglia, C., S. La Posta, L. Mariniello, & S. Ruffo., (1995). 29. Crustacea Malacostraca I (Phyllocarida, Hoplocarida, Bathynellacea, Thermosbaenacea, Mysidacea, Cumacea). Pages 1–12, In: Minelli, A., S. Ruffo, & S. La Posta (eds.), Checklist Delle Specie Della Fauna Italiana. Calderini, Bologna.
- Froneman, P.W., (2001). Stable isotope (∂13C) composition of the food web of the temperate Kariega Estuary (Eastern Cape). African Journal of Aquatic Sciences 26 (1): 49-56.
- Froneman, P.W., (2004). Zooplankton community structure and biomass in a southern African temporarily open/closed estuary. Estuarine, Coastal and Shelf Science 60: 125-132.
- Furnestin, M.L., (1957). Chaetognathes et zooplancton du secteur atlantique marocain. Revue des Travaux de l´Institut des Pêches Maritimes 21 (1-2): 1-356.

== G ==
- Gabe, M., (1956). Histologie comparée de la glande de mue (organe Y) des crustacés malacostracés. Annales des Sciences Naturelles. Zoologie et Biologie Animale 18: 145-152.
- Gadzikiewicz, W., (1905). Ueber den feineren Bau des Herzens bei Malakostraken. Jenaische Zeitschrift für Naturwissenschaft, N.F., 32: 203-234 (4 plates).
- Gage, J., (1972a). Community structure of the benthos in Scottish sea-lochs. I. Introduction and species diversity. Marine Biology 14: 281-297.
- Gage, J., (1972b). A preliminary survey of the benthic macrofauna and sediments in Lochs Etive and Creran, sea-lochs along the west coast of Scotland. Journal of the Marine Biological Association of Plymouth 52: 237-276.
- Gage, J.D., (1979). Macrobenthic community structure in the Rockall Trough. Ambio Special Report, No. 6: 43-46.
- Gage, J.D., & G.G. Coghill., (1977). Studies on the dispersion patterns of Scottish Sea Loch benthos from contiguous core transects. Pages 319-359, In: Coull, B.C. (ed.), Ecology of Marine Benthos. University of South Carolina Press, Columbia.
- Gage, J.D., & P.A. Tyler., (1991). Deep-Sea Biology. A Natural History of Organisms at the Deep-Sea Floor. Cambridge University Press, Cambridge.
- Gage, J.D., P.J.D. Lambshead, J.D.D. Bishop, C.T. Stuart, & N.S. Jones., (2004). Large-scale biodiversity pattern of Cumacea (Peracarida:Crustacea) in the deep Atlantic. Marine Ecology Progress Series 277: 181-196.
- Gage, J.D., R.H. Lightfoot, M. Pearson, & P.A. Tyler., (1980). An introduction to a sample time-series of abyssal macrobenthos:methods and principal sources of variability. Oceanologica Acta 3 (2): 169-176.
- Galil, B.S., (2007). Seeing red:alien species along the Mediterranean coast of Israel. Aquatic Invasions 2 (4): 281-312.
- Gallardo, V.A. & J.C. Castillo., (1969). Quantitative benthic survey of the infauna of Chile Bay (Greenwich I., South Shetland Is.)- Gayana Zoología 16: 3-18 .
- Gallardo, V.A., J.G. Castillo, M.A. Retamal, A. Yáñez, H.I. Moyano, & J.G. Hermosilla., (1977). Quantitative studies on the soft-bottom macrobenthic animal communities of shallow Antarctic bays. Pages 361-387, In: Llano, G.A. (ed.), Adaptations Within Antarctic Ecosystems. Proceedings of the Third SCAR Symposium on Antarctic Biology. Smithsonian Institution, Washington, D.C.
- Gambi, M.C., & S. Bussotti., (1999). Composition, abundance and stratification of soft-bottom macrobenthos from selected areas of the Ross Sea shelf (Antarctica). Polar Biology 21: 347-374.
- Gamito, S., (2008). Three main stressors acting on the Ria Formosa lagoonal system (Southern Portugal):Physical stress, organic matter pollution and the land-ocean gradient. Estuarine, Coastal and Shelf Science, 77 (4): 710-720.
- Gamito, S., A. Pires, C. Rita, & K. Erzini., (2003). Food availability and the feeding ecology of Ichthyofauna of a Ria Formosa (south Portugal) water reservoir. Estuaries 26 (4A): 938-948.
- Gamô, S., (1958). [On some species of cumacean Crustacea from Sagami Bay]. Dobutsugaku Zasshi 67 (12): 383-389 .
- Gamô, S., (1959). On a cumacean Crustacea (Diastylis corniculatus Hale) obtained by the second Japanese Antarctic research expedition. Biological Results of the Japanese Antarctic research Expedition, Seto Marine Biological Laboratory 7: 3–7.
- Gamô, S., (1960). On three new species of cumacean Crustacea Genus Campylaspis from Tanabe Bay KII Peninsula. Seto Marine Biological Laboratory 8 (1): 153–161.
- Gamô, S., (1960). On six new species of cumacean Crustacea, genus Campylaspis (Nannastacidae) from Japan. Zoological Magazine, Tokyo 69: 369–387.
- Gamo, S., (1962). Leucon simanensis sp. nov. and L. varians sp. nov. Zoological Magazine (Dobutsugaku Zasshi) 71: 256–261.
- Gamo, S., (1962). On the cumacean Crustacea from Tanabe Bay, KII Peninsula. Seto Marine Biological Laboratory 10 (2): 153–210.
- Gamo, S., (1963). On the cumacean Crustacea obtained from Amami-Oshima Island, southern Japan. Yokohama National University 2 (10): 29–60.
- Gamo, S., (1964). On some cumacean Crustacea from Sagami Bay, with the description of two new species. Yokohama National University 2 (11): 17–28.
- Gamo, S., (1964). Cyclaspis purpurascens sp. nov., a new cumacean Crustacea from Tanabe Bay, KII Peninsula. Seto Marine Biological Laboratory 12 (2): 191–220.
- Gamo, S., (1964). A new cumacean Crustacea, Cumella alveata sp. nov., from Sagami Bay. Bulletin of the Biogeographical Society of Japan 23 (5): 23–28.
- Gamo, S., (1964). On three new species of Cumacea from the southern sea of Japan. Crustaceana 7 (4): 241–253.
- Gamo, S., (1965). On three new species of Cumacea, Crustacea, from Akkeshi Bay. Akkeshi Marine Biological Station 14: 1–21.
- Gamo, S., (1965). Cumacean Crustacea from Akkeshi Bay, Hokkaido. Seto Marine Biological Laboratory 8 (3): 187–219.
- Gamo, S., (1967). Studies on the Cumacea (Crustacea, Malacostraca) of Japan. Part 1. Seto Marine Biological Laboratory 15: 133–163.
- Gamo, S., (1967). Studies on the Cumacea (Crustacea, Malacostraca) of Japan, Part II. Seto Marine Biological Laboratory 15 (4): 245–274.
- Gamo, S., (1968). Notes on the cumacean Crustacea from Suruga Bay. Yokohama National University 2 (14): 1–6.
- Gamo, S., (1968). Studies on the Cumacea (Crustacea, Malacostraca) of Japan, Part III. Seto Marine Biological Laboratory 16 (3): 147–192.
- Gamo, S., (1969). Sympodomma hatagumoana sp. nov., a new Cumacea from Sagami Bay. Seto Marine Biological Laboratory 17 (3): 175–182.
- Gamo, S., (1975). A new cumacean Crustacea Hemilamprops bigibba sp. nov. from Sagami Bay. Seto Marine Biological Laboratory 22 (5): 229–235.
- Gamo, S., (1976). Eocuma spinifera sp. nov., a new cumacean Crustacea from Japan. Bulletin of the National Science Museum 2 (2): 93–102.
- Gamo, S., (1977). Procampylaspis unicornis sp. nov., a new cumacean Crustacea from the east China sea. Seto Marine Biological Laboratory 14 (1): 133–139.
- Gamo, S., (1980). Platysympus muranoi sp. nov. (Cumacea, Crustacea) from Japan.-- Yokohama National University. Yokohama National University 2 (27): 1–6.
- Gamo, S., (1985). Cumellopsis surugaensis sp. nov. (Crustacea, Cumacea) from Japan. Bulletin of the Biogeographical Society of Japan 40 (7): 51–54.
- Gamo, S., (1985). Makrokylindrus (Makrokylindrus) hystrix sp. nov. and Leptostylis quadridentata sp. nov., two new abyssal cumaceans from the Japan Trench (Crustacea). Yokohama National University 2 (32): 1–10.
- Gamo, S., (1986). Bodotria spinifera and Petalosarsia brevirostris, two new cumacean crustaceans from Japan. Yokohama National University 2 (33): 1–11.
- Gamo, S., (1986). A new cumacean, Zimmeriana azumai sp. nov. (Crustacea) from Japan. Bulletin of the Biogeographical Society of Japan 41 (5): 37–43.
- Gamo, S., (1987). Two new cumacean crustaceans, Paraleucon ultraabyssalis sp. nov. and Leptostylis spinescens sp. nov. from the Japan Trench. Bulletin of the Biogeographical Society of Japan 47: 43–48.
- Gamo, S., (1987). Cumacean crustaceans obtained by the 26th Japanese Antarctic research expedition, (1984–1985), with descriptions of four new species. Proc. MOPR Symp. Polar Biol. 1: 145–160.
- Gamo, S., (1987). Two new cumacean crustaceans, Platysympus ovalis sp. nov. and P. quadrangulatus sp. nov. from Surga Bay. Yokohama National University 2 (34): 1–14.
- Gamo, S., (1988). A new abyssal cumacean crustacean, Leucon stenorhynchus sp. nov. (Leuconidae) from the Japan Trench. Bulletin of the Biogeographical Society of Japan 43: 25–28.
- Gamo, S., (1988). Four new deep-sea cumacean crustaceans from Japanese waters. Yokohama National University 2 (35): 1–21.
- Gamo, S., (1989). Some bathyal cumacean and isopod crustaceans from the Okinawa Trough, the East China Sea, with descriptions of a new genus and five new species. Bulletin of the Biogeographical Society of Japan 44: 85–104.
- Gamo, S., (1989). Four new species of deep-sea Cumacea (Crustacea) from the Japan Trench. Scientific Reports of the Yokohama National University 2 (36): 11–33.
- Gamo, S., (1998). Two new cumacean crustaceans, Vemakylindrus multiuncifer and V. gymnocephalus (Diastylidae) from the Bathyal Depth in Suruga Bay. Bulletin of the National Science Museum, Tokyo, Series A 24 (4): 213–223.
- Gerken, S., (1999). Case 3078: Diastylis Say 1818 (Crustacea, Cumacea): proposed designation of Cuma rathkii Krøyer, 1841 as the type species. Bulletin of Zoological Nomenclature 56 (3): 174–176.
- Gerken, S., (2001). The Gynodiastylidae. Memoirs of the Museum of Victoria 59 (1): 1–276.
- Gerken, S., (2002). A new species of Vemakylindrus (Crustacea: Cumacea: Diastylidae) from California. Proceedings of the Biological Society of Washington 115 (2): 419–425.
- Gerken, S., (2005). Two new Diastylidae (Crustacea: Cumacea) from California, collected by the R/V Velero IV. Proceedings of the Biological Society of Washington 118 (2) 270–284.
- Gerken, S., (2005). Two new Cumacea (Crustacea: Peracarida) from Cook Inlet, Alaska. Proceedings of the Biological Society of Washington 118 (4).
- Gerken, S. & J. Gross, (2000). Gynodiastylis laciniacristatus, sp. nov. (Crustacea: Cumacea) from Australia. Proceedings of the Biological Society of Washington 113 (1): 95–103.
- Gerken, S. & P.A. Haye. (2006) A new Chilean cumacean, Anchistylis watlingi, sp. nov. (Cumacea: Diastylidae). Journal of Crustacean Biology 27 (1): 140–148.
- Gerken, S. & J. Lowry, (2003). The Gynodiastylidae. DELTA database and INTKEY illustrated, interactive key to the cumacean family Gynodiastylidae.
- Gerken, S. & A.-N. Lorz, (2007). Colurostylis castlepointensis, a new shallow-water diastylid (Crustacea: Cumacea) from New Zealand. Zootaxa 1524: 61–68
- Gerken S. & A. McCarthy, (2007). A Re-Description of Chalarostylis elegans (Cumacea: Lampropidae). Journal of Crustacean Biology: 27 (1): 149–153.
- Gerken S. & A. McCarthy, (2008). Kerguelenica petrescui (Crustacea: Cumacea), A New Species from Australian Waters. Journal of Crustacean Biology. 28 (3): 564–571.
- Gerken, S. & H. Ryder, (2002). Campylaspis rex, sp. nov. (Crustacea: Cumacea) from New Zealand. Proceedings of the Biological Society of Washington 115 (2): 412–418.
- Gerken, S. & L. Watling, (1998). Diastylis tongoyensis, a new diastylid (Crustacea: Cumacea) from the northern central coast of Chile, with an amendment to the description of Diastylis crenellata Watling & McCann 1997. Proceedings of the Biological Society of Washington 111 (4): 857–874.
- Gerken, S. & L. Watling, (1999). Cumacea (Crustacea) of the Faroe Island Region. rodskaparrit 47: 199–227.
- Gerken, S., Watling, L. & Klitgaard, A.B., (2000). Contumacious Beasts: A story of two Diastylidae (Cumacea) from Arctic waters. Journal of Crustacean Biology 20(1): 31–43.
- Gerken, S., L. Watling, et al., (1997). The Order Mysidacea. Taxonomic Atlas of the Fauna of the Santa Maria Basin and Western Santa Barbara Channel. J. Blake. Santa Barbara, Santa Barbara Museum of natural History. 10: 123–142.
- Gilson, G., (1906). Recherches sur les deux Pseudocuma de la mer Flamande P. longicornis Spence Bate et P. similis G. O. Sars. Mémoires de la Soc. Entom. de Belgique 12: 77–98.
- Gilson, G., (1921). Sympoda (Cumacea). 557–600.
- Given, R. R., (1961). The cumacean fauna of the Southern California continental shelf. No. 1, Family Leuconidae. Bulletin, Southern California Academy of Sciences 60: 129–146.
- Given, R. R., (1964). The cumacean fauna of the Southern California continental shelf. No. 2, family Mesolampropidae. Crustaceana 7: 284–292.
- Given, R. R., (1965). Five collections of Cumacea from the Alaskan arctic. Arctic 18 (4): 213–229.
- Gladfelter, W. B., (1975). Quantitative distribution of shallow-water Cumacea from the vicinity of Dillon Beach, California, with descriptions of five new species. Crustaceana 29 (3): 241–251.
- Goodsir, H.D.S., (1843). Description of the genus Cuma, and of two new genera nearly allied to it. Edinb. New Philos. J. 34: 119–129 pls 2–3
- Greenwood, J. G. and M. G. Johnston, (1967). A new species of Glyphocuma (Cumacea: Bodotriidae) from Moreton Bay, Queensland. Royal Society of Queensland 79 (8): 93–98.

== H ==
- Hale, H., (1927). The Crustaceans of South Australia. Part I. Adelaide, Harrison Weir, Government Printer, North Terrace.
- Hale, H., (1928). Australian Cumacea. Trans. R. Soc. S. Aust. 52: 31–48
- Hale, H., (1929). The Crustaceans of South Australia. Part II. Adelaide, Harrison Weir, Government Printer, North Terrace.
- Hale, H., (1932). A cumacean new to south Australia. Records of the South Australian Museum 4 (4): 549–550.
- Hale, H., (1936). Cumacea from a South Australian reef. Records of the South Australian Museum 5: 404–438.
- Hale, H., (1937). Three new Cumacea from South Australia. Records of the South Australian Museum 5 (4): 395–438.
- Hale, H., (1937). Cumacea and Nebaliacea. B.A.N.Z.A.R.E Reports series b 4 (2): 37–56.
- Hale, H.M., (1937). Cumacea and Nebaliacea. Australasian Antarctic Expedition, 1911–14. Scientific Reports. Series C. –Zoology and Botany 2: 5–45
- Hale, H., (1937). Further notes on the Cumacea of South Australian reefs. Records of the South Australian Museum 6(1): 61–74.
- Hale, H., (1943). Notes on two sand-dwelling Cumacea (Gephyrocuma and Picrocuma). Records of the South Australian Museum 7 (4): 337–342.
- Hale, H., (1944). Australian Cumacea, No. 7, the Genus Cyclaspis. Records of the South Australian Museum 8 (1): 63–142.
- Hale, H., (1944). Australian Cumacea. No. 8. The Family Bodotriidae. Transactions of the Royal Society of South Australia 68 (2): 225–285.
- Hale, H., (1945). Australian Cumacea. No. 9. The Family Nannastacidae. Records of the South Australian Museum 8 (2): 145–218.
- Hale, H., (1945). Australian Cumacea. No. 10. The Family Leuconidae. Transactions of the Royal Society of South Australia 69 (1): 86–95.
- Hale, H., (1945). Australian Cumacea. No. 11. The Family Diastylidae (part 1). Transactions of the Royal Society of South Australia 69 (2): 173–211.
- Hale, H., (1946). Australian Cumacea. No. 12. The family Diastylidae (part 2) Gynodiastylis and related genera. Records of the South Australian Museum 8 (3): 357–444.
- Hale, H., (1946). Australian Cumacea, No. 13, the Family Lampropidae. Transactions of the Royal Society of South Australia 70 (2): 178–188.
- Hale, H., (1948). Australian Cumacea, No. 14, Further notes on the genus Cyclaspis. Records of the South Australian Museum 9 (1): 1–42.
- Hale, H., (1949). Australian Cumacea. No. 15. The Family Bodotriidae (cont.). Records of the South Australian Museum 9 (2): 107–125.
- Hale, H., (1949). Australian Cumacea. No. 16. The Family Nannastacidae. Records of the South Australian Museum 9(2): 225–245.
- Hale, H., (1951). Australian Cumacea. No, 17. The Family Diastylidae (cont.). Records of the South Australian Museum 9 (4): 353–370.
- Hale, H., (1953). Australian Cumacea. No. 18. Notes on distribution and night collecting with artificial light. Transactions of the Royal Society of South Australia 76: 70–76.
- Hansen, H. J., (1887). Malacostraca marine Groenlandie occidentalis. Oversigt over det vestlige Grønlands Fauna af malakostrake Havkrebsdyr. Videnskabelige Meddelelser fra Dansk Naturhistorisk Forening 9: 5–29, 198–223, plate 7.
- Hansen, H. J., (1895). Isopoden, Cumaceen und Stomatopoden der planktonexpedition. Kiel und Leipzig, Berlag von Lipsius & Tischer: 51–63.
- Hansen, H. J., (1908). Zoologie, Schizopoda and Cumacea. Frais du Gouvernement Belge, sous la direction de la Commission de la Belgica: 15–17.
- Hansen, H. J., (1920). The Danish Ingolf Expedition. Crustacea Malacostraca 4. Zoological museum of Copenhagen University 3: 1–86.
- Harada, I., (1959). Cumacean Fauna of Japan. Japanese Journal of Zoology 12(3): 229–246.
- Harada, I., (1960). Cumacea fauna of Japan II, Family Diastylidae (Part 1), Genus Dimorphostylis. Science Reports of the Tokyl Kyoiku Daigoku, Section B: 201–225.
- Harada, I., (1962). Cumacean Fauna of Japan II. Family Diastylidae (part 2). Genus Gynodiastylis. Japanese Journal of Zoology 13 (2): 293–306.
- Harada, I., (1964). Cumacea fauna of Japan III, Family Bodotriidae (Part 1), Genus Heterocuma Miers and Sympodoma Stebbing. Japanese Journal of Zoology 14 (2): 97–107.
- Harada, I., (1967). Cumacean fauna of Japan III, Family Bodotriidae (Part 2), Genus Bodotria Goodsir 1843. Japanese Journal of Zoology 15: 221–247.
- Harada, I., (1967). Postlarval development and growth-stages in cumacean Crustacea. Japanese Journal of Zoology 15: 344–347.
- Hart, J., (1930). Some Cumacea of the Vancouver Island Region. Contributions to Canadian Biology and Fisheries 6: 25–40.
- Hart, J., (1939). Cumacea and Decapoda of the Western Canadian Arctic region, 1936–1937. Canadian Journal of Research 17: 62–67.
- Haye, P. A., (2007). Systematics of the genera of Bodotriidae (Crustacea: Cumacea). Zoological Journal of the Linnean Society 151: 1–58
- Haye, P. A. & Gerken S., (2005). A new species of Cumacea (Crustacea: Peracarida) from Chile, Lamprops kensleyi. Proceedings of the Biological Society of Washington 118 (1) 30–37.
- Haye, P., Kornfield, I. & Watling, L., (2004). Molecular insights into cumacean family relationships (Crustacea, Cumacea). Molecular Phylogenetics and Evolution 30: 798–804.
- Hong, J. S. and M. R. Park, (1999). The genus Eudorella (Crustacea: Cumacea) from the Yellow Sea, with descriptions of a new species. Journal of the Marine Biological Association of the United Kingdom 79: 445–457.

== J ==
- Jaume, D. & G.A. Boxshall, (2008). Global diversity of cumaceans & tanaidaceans (Crustacea: Cumacea & Tanaidacea) in freshwater. Hydrobiologia 595: 225–230.
- Jones, N. S., (1955), The Cumacea of the Benguela current,. Discovery Reports 27: 279–292.
- Jones, N. S., (1956). Cumacea from the west coast of Africa. Atlantide Report 4: 183–212.
- Jones, N. S., (1957). Cumacea, Key to families and references. Conseil International pour l'Exploration de la Mer (sheet?): 71–76.
- Jones, N. S., (1960). Cumacea from South Africa. Annals and Magazine of Natural History 2 (13): 171–180.
- Jones, N. S., (1963). The marine fauna of New Zealand: Crustaceans of the Order Cumacea. New Zealand Oceanographic Institute 23: 1–81.
- Jones, N. S., (1969). The systematics and distribution of Cumacea from depths exceeding 100 meters- Galathea Report. Scientific Results of the Danish Expedition Round the World 1950–1952 10: 100–180.
- Jones, N. S., (1971). The fauna of the Ross Sea, Part 8. New Zealand Department of Scientific and Industrial Research Bulletin 206: 33–46.
- Jones, N. S., (1973). Some new Cumacea from deep water in the Atlantic. Crustaceana 25 (3): 297–319.
- Jones, N. S., (1974). Campylaspis species (Crustacea, Cumacea) from the deep Atlantic. Bulletin of the British Museum (Natural History), Zoology Series 27 (6): 249–300.
- Jones, N. S., (1976). British Cumaceans. Synopses of the British Fauna (New Series) 7: 12–13.
- Jones, N. S., (1984), The family Nannastacidae (Crustacea, Cumacea) from the deep Atlantic,. Bulletin British Museum. (Natural History) Zoology, 46 (3),207–289.
- Jones, N. S., (1990). The Cumacea of the Atlantic phase of the Balgim Cruise. Cahier Biologie Marine 31: 75–85.
- Jones, N. S. and W. D. Burbanck, (1959). Almyracuma proximoculi gen. et. sp. nov. (Crustacea, Cumacea) from brackish water of Cape Cod, Massachusetts. Biological Bulletin 116 (1): 115–124.
- Just, J., (1970). Cumacea from Jorgen Bronlund Fjord North Greenland. Meddelelser om Grønland Undivne af Kommissionen for Videnskabelige Undersøgelser I Grønland 184 (8): 6–22.

== K ==
- Kang, B. J. and K. S. Lee, (1995). Two species of the family Bodotriidae (Crustacea, Malacostraca, Cumacea) from Korea. Korean Journal of Zoology 38: 531–541.
- Kang, B. J. and K. S. Lee, (1995). Three species of the genus Dimorphostylis (Crustacea, Cumacea, Diastylidae) new to Korea. Korean Journal of Systematic Zoology 11 (2): 167–182.
- Kang, B. J. and K. S. Lee, (1996). A new species of the genus Diastylis (Cumacea, Diastylidae) from Korea. Korean Journal of Systematic Zoology 12 (3): 211–220.
- Kemp, S., (1916). Fauna of the Chilka Lake Cumacea. Memoirs of the Indian Museum 5: 395–402.
- Kossmann, R. (1880). Zoologische Ergebnisse einer ausgeführten Reise in die Küstengebiete des Rothem Meeres 2: 88–90.
- Henrik Nikolaj Krøyer|Krøyer, H., (1837). Fire nye Arter af Slaegten Cuma. Naturhistorist Tidskrift 3: 506–534.
- Krøyer, H.N. (1846). On Cumaceerne Familie. Naturh. Tidsskr. (2)2: 123–211 pls 1–2
- Kurian, C. V., (1951). The Cumacea of Travancore. Marine Biological Laboratory, Trivandrum: 77–118.
- Kurian, C. V., (1954). Notes on Cumacea (Sympoda) in the zoological survey of India. Records of the Indian Museum 52: 275–312.
- Kurian, C. V., (1961). Three species of Cumacea from the lakes of Kerala. Bulletin of the Central Research Institute, Series C 8: 55–61.
- Kurian, C. V., (1963). Cumacea collected by the R.V. Conch during her cruises off the Kerala coast, India, in 1958 and 1959. Crustaceana 8 (2): 184–188.
- Kurian, C.V. & Radha Devi, A. (1983). A new species of Cumacea (Crustacea, Peracarida) from Vizhinjom, Kerala, India. In P. A. John ed., Selected papers on Crustacea. Trivandrum: 149–153.
- Kurian, C.V. & Radha Devi, A., (1985) Cumacea from the North Sea. Indian Journal of Marine Sciences, 14: 42–43.
- Kurian, C.V. & Radha Devi, A., (1986). Distribution of Cumacea along Indian coasts. Biology of Benthic Marine Organisms: 289–296.

== L ==
- Ledoyer, M., (1965). Sur quelques espèces nouvelles d'Iphinoë (Crustacea, Cumacea) discussion et description comparative des espèces Europèennes dèja connues (1). Rec. Trav. St. Mar. End. Bull 39 (55): 253–275.
- Ledoyer, M., (1972). Mancocuma altera Zimmer, Cumace peu connu du Golfe du Saine-Laurent (Crustacea). Bulletin of the Museum d'Histoire Naturelle in Paris, Zoology 49 (63): 783–787.
- Ledoyer, M., (1973). une petite collection de Cumacés recueillis aux Iles Kerguelen. Tethys 5 (4): 709–714.
- Ledoyer, M., (1977). Cumacés (Crustacea) des Iles Kerguelen recueillis par le N. O. la Japonaise en 1972 et 1974 et par le M. S. Marion-Dufresne en 1974. Comité National Français des Recherches Arctiques et Antarctiques 42: 193–213.
- Ledoyer, M., (1983). Contribution à l'écologie de la faune vagile profonde de la Méditerranénee nord-occidentale 2. les Cumacés (Crustacea). Tethys 11 (1): 67–81.
- Ledoyer, M., (1988). Les Cumacés Mediterranéens profonds (Crustacea) des campagnes biomede I et II et Balgim, synthese de la distribution bathyale du groupe en Mediterranée occidentale. Mesogee 47: 59–70.
- Ledoyer, M., (1988). Cumacés (Crustacea) profonds de la région de l'Ile de Mayotte, Canal de Mozambique, Océan Indien (Campagne Benthédi, 1977). Mésogée 48: 131–172.
- Ledoyer, M., (1993). Cumacea (Crustacea) de la campagne EPOS 3 du R. V. Polarstern en mre de Weddell, Antarctique. Journal of Natural History 27: 1041–1096.
- Ledoyer, M., (1997). Les Cumacés (Crustacea) des campagnes Eumeli 2, 3, et 4 au large du Cap Blanc (est Atlantique tropical). Journal of Natural History 31: 841–886.
- Lee, C. M. & K. S. Lee, (1997). Two species of the genus Bodotria (Cumacea, Bodotriidae) from Korea. Korean Journal of Systematic Zoology 13 (3): 259–267.
- Lee, C. M. & K. S. Lee, (1998). Three species of cumaceans (Crustacea: Cumacea) from Korean waters. Korean Journal of Systematic Zoology 14 (2): 71–89.
- Lee, C. M. & K. S. Lee, (2006). Nippoleucon projectus, a New Species of Leuconid Cumaceans (Cumacea, Leuconidae) from Korea Korean I. Biol. Sci., 10 (2): 93–101.
- Lie, U., (1969). Cumacea from Puget Sound and off the northwestern coast of Washington, with description of two new species. Crustaceana 17: 19–30.
- Lie, U., (1971). Additional Cumacea from Washington, U.S.A. with description of a new species. Crustaceana: 3–5.
- Liu, H. & R. Liu, (1990). Study on Cumacea/ Crustacea, Malacostraca. Studia Marina Sinica 31: 195–228.
- Loeuff, P. and A. Intes, (1972). Cumacés du plateau continental de côte d'Ivoire. O.R.S.T.M., Ser. Océanogr 10 (1): 19–46.
- Loeuff, P. and A. Intes, (1977). Les Bodotria (Crustacea, Cumacea) des mers d'Europe et des côtes occidentales de l'Afrique tropicale. Bulletin du Muséum National d'Histoire Naturelle, Series 3 498: 1137–1164.
- Lomakina, M., (1952). Noviie vidi kumovah rakov (Cumacea) is dalnevostocinih morei. Tr. Zool. Inst. Akad. Nauk SSSR 12: 155–170.
- Lomakina, M., (1955). Otriad kumovie raki (Cumacea). Vol. Atlas bespozvonocinih dalnevostocinih morei. SSSR M.-L. Ed. Akad. Nauk. CCCR: 125–127.
- Lomakina, M., (1955). Pavlovskeola campylaspoides- predstavitel novogo roda kumovih rakov (Cumacea: Nannastacidae). Trudy zoologicheskogo instituta = Travaux de l'Institut zoologique de l'Académie des sciences de l'URSS/ Akamediia Nauk Soiuza Soveskikh Sotsialisicheskikh Republik, Leningrad 21: 190–192.
- Lomakina, M., (1964). Mysidi, Kumatei i Eufauzieveie raki (Mysidacea, Cumacea et Euphausiacea) po materialam Arkticeskih Expeditii na L/R F. Lifke, (1955). Trudy Arktica Antarktica N. Issl. Inst. 259: 241–254.
- Lomakina, M., (1965). Kumovie raki (Cumacea) antarkticeskloi Oblasti. V. sb. Rezultati biol. issled. Sov. Antarkt. exp., (1955–1958). Inst. Akad. Nauk SSSR 3.
- Lomakina, M., (1967). New species of cumacea collected by the Soviet Antarctic expedition at South-Eastern Australia and in the North of the Indian Ocean. Trudy Zoologicheskogo instituta, Akademi Nauk SSSR 43: 99–109.
- Lomakina, M., (1968). Kumovie raki (Cumacea) antarkticeskoi oblasti. Ruzultati biol. Issl. Sov. Antarkt. Exp., (1955–1958). Zool. Inst. Akademi Nauk SSSR 4: 97–140.
- Lomakina, M., (1968). Stroenie pecenocinih diverticul u cumovih rakov (Cumacea) i ego filogeneticeskoe znancenie. Zool. Journal 47 (1): 60–72.
- Lomakina, N., (1952). Novfie interenie v zogeograficeskom otnosenii nahodki kumovih rakov v danevostocinih moriah. Zoological Journal Moskwa 31 (2): 244–248.
- Lomakina, N., (1955). Cumacea from the far-east seas. Trudy zoologicheskogo instituta = Travaux de l'Institut zoologique de l'Académie des sciences de l'URSS/ Akamediia Nauk Soiuza Soveskikh Sotsialisicheskikh Republik, Leningrad 18: 112–165.
- Lomakina, N., (1955). Otriad Kumovie raki (Cumacea). In Atlas bespozvonocinih dalnevostocinih morei, published by Trudy zoologicheskogo instituta, Trudy zoologicheskogo instituta: 125–127.
- Lomakina, N., (1955). Order Cumacea. Atlas of the invertebrates of the far eastern seas of the USSR: 169–172.
- Lomakina, N., (1958). Issledovaniia fauny morei / Akademiia nauk, SSSR, Zoologicheskii institut.
- Lomakina, N., (1958). Cumacea of the seas of the USSR. Opredliteli po faune SSSR 66: 1–301.
- Lomakina, N., (1960). K faune Cumacea (Crustacea, Malacostraca) priberejnoi zoni Jeltogo Moria. Oceanologia et Limnologia Sinica 3 (2): 94–114.
- Lomakina, N., (1968). Cumacea of the Antarctic region. Studies of Marine Fauna 6 (14): 97–140.
- López-González, P.J., Bandera, M.E., Alfonso, M.I. & García-Gómez, J.C., (1996) A rare mediterranean cumacean, Fontainella mediterranea (Crustacea), at the threshold of the Atlantic Ocean. Cahiers de Biologie Marine 37 (2): 113–120.
- Lopez-Gonzalez, P. J., M. E. Bandera, et al., (1997). Vemakylindrus cantabricus, a new species of Diastylidae (Crustacea, Cumacea) from the northern Iberian coasts. Helgoländer Meeresuntersuchungen 51: 61–68.

== M ==
- Malzahn E., (1972). Cumaceenfunde (Crustacea, Malacostraca) aus dem niederrheinischen Zechstein, Teil 1. Geol. Jahrb. 90: 441–462.
- Marcusen, J., (1894). Über ein neues Cumacean Genus Eocuma, Fam. Cumacidae, aus Japan. Sitzungsberichte der Gesellschaft Naturforschender Freunde zu Berlin 1894: 17–171.
- Mccarthy, A.M., Gerken, S., Mcgrath, D. & Mccormack, G.P., (2006). Monopseudocuma a new genus from the North East Atlantic and redescription of Pseudocuma gilsoni Bačescu, 1950 (Cumacea: Pseudocumatidae), Zootaxa 1203: 39–56.
- Menzies, R. Micca, M. F. & D. Roccatagliata, (2002). A new species of Cumella (Cumacea, Nannastacidae) from Argentina, and a partial redescription of Cumella vicina Zimmer, 1944. Crustaceana 75 (2): 145–158.
- Miers, E. G., (1879). On a small collection of Crustacea made by Edward Whymper, Esq., chiefly in the N. Greenland Seas, with an appendix on additional species collected by the late British Arctic Expedition. 59–73.
- Mitchell, F. J., (1965). Obituary and bibliography of Herbert Matthew Hale. Records of the South Australian Museum 15 (1): 1–8.
- Modlin, R. F., (1992). Population structure, distribution, life cycle and reproductive strategy of Spilocuma watlingi Omholt and Heard, 1979 and S. salomani Watling, 1977 (Cumacea, Bodotriidae) from coastal waters of the Gulf of Mexico. Northeast Gulf Science 12 (2): 83–91.
- Montagu, G. (1804). Descriptions of several marine animals found on the south coast of Devonshire. Trans. Linn. Soc. Lond. Zool. 7: 80–84
- Mordukhai-Boltovskoi, F.D. & Romanova, N.N., (1973) Novyi vid i rod kumovyh rakov (Cumacea) iz Kaspijskogo Morija. Zoologicheskii Zhurnal, 52 (3): 429–432.
- Mühlenhardt-Siegel, U., (1994). Leucon parasiphonatus, a new species (Crustacea: Cumacea: Leuconidae) from Antarctic waters. Helgoländer Meeresuntersuchungen 48: 79–88.
- Mühlenhardt-Siegel, U., (1996). Some remarks on the taxonomy of Antarctic Leuconidae (Cumacea: Crustacea) with a description of a new species, Leucon intermedius n. sp. Helgoländer Meeresuntersuchungen 50: 391–408.
- Mühlenhardt-Siegel, U., (1996). Cumacea (Crustacea) from the Red Sea and the Maldives (Indian Ocean) in the collection of the Zoological Museum, Hamburg, with the description of seven new species and a new genus. Beaufortia 46 (7): 105–134.
- Mühlenhardt-Siegel, U., (1996). Ein beitrag zur Cumacea-Fauna aus dem Kustenflachwasser des Südlichen Afrika, mit beschreibung von Cumella hartmanni n. sp. Mitteilungen aus dem Hamburg Zool. Mus. Inst. 93: 117–140.
- Mühlenhardt-Siegel, U., (1999). On the biogeography of Cumacea (Crustacea: Malacostraca). A comparison between South America, the Subantarctic Islands and Antarctica: the present state of the art. Scientia Marina 63 (supplement 1): 295–302.
- Mühlenhardt-Siegel, U., (2000). Cumacea (Crustacea) from the Seychelles, Maldives, Sri Lanka (Western Indian Ocean) and the Red Sea, with the description of six new species. Beaufortia 50 (12): 197–222.
- Muradian, Z., (1976). Species belonging to the Genus Campylaspis (Cumacea, Nannastacidae) collected from the Western Atlantic. Travaux du Muséum d'Histoire Naturelle Grigore Antipa 17: 65–83.
- Muradian, Z., (1979). On two new species of Campylaspis (Cumacea, Nannastacidae) and some comments on the criteria for the diagnosis in the genus with the establishment of two new subgenera: Sarsia and Bacescua. Revue Roumaine de Biologie Série Biologie Animale 24: 104,105.

== N ==
- Norman, M., (1863). Report on the Crustacea of the dredging expedition Doggerbank. Transactions of the Tyneside Naturalists' Field Club 5 (IV): 263–280 p. 271.
- Norman, M., (1867). Report of the committee appointed for the purpose of exploring the coasts of the Hebrides by means of the dredge. Part II. On the Crustacea, Echinodermata, Polyzoa, Actinozoa, and Hydrozoa. Report of the British Association for the Advancement of Science 1866: 193–206.
- Norman, M., (1879). Crustacea Cumacea of the 'Lightning', 'Porcupine', and 'Valorous' expeditions. Annals and Magazine of Natural History 3: 54–73.

== O ==
- Ohlin, A., (1901). Arctic Crustacea collected during the Swedish Arctic Expeditions 1898 and 1899. Leptostraca, Isopoda, Cumacea. Bihang Till K. Svenska Vet.-Akad. Handlingar 26: 1–54.
- Omholt, P.E., and Heard, R.W., (1979). A species of Spilocuma (Cumacea: Bodotriidae: Mancocuminae) from the Gulf of Mexico. Proceedings of the Biological Society of Washington 92: 184–194.
- Omholt, P.E., and Heard, R.W., (1982). Cyclaspis bacescui, new species (Cumacea: Bodotriidae) from the Eastern Gulf of Mexico. Journal of Crustacean Biology 2: 1 20–129.

== P ==
- Park, M. R. and J. S. Hong, (1999). Three species of the genus Diastylis (Crustacea: Cumacea) from the Yellow Sea. Journal of Natural History 33: 979–998.
- Park, M. R. and J. S. Hong, (2008). A New Species of Petalosarsia (Cumacea: Pseudocumatidae) from Korean Waters. Korea Ocean Marine Environmental Engineering Science and Technology Council. p. 368
- Patel, C.K., P.A. Haye and I. Kornfield, (2003). Eocuma petrescui, a new species of bodotriid cumacean (Crustacea; Peracarida) from Malaysia. Proc. Biol. Soc. Washington, 116: 978–985.
- Paulson, O., (1875). Studies on Crustacea of the Red Sea (Part 1) Suborder Cumacea. Issledovaniya Rakoobrazn. Krasnogo Morya, Kiev 1: 128, 134–137.
- Petrescu, I., (1990). Campylaspis cousteaui, a new cumacean species from the submarine caves of Bermuda. Revue Roumaine de Biologie, Série de Biologie Animale 36 (1–2): 9–12.
- Petrescu, I., (1991). Contribution to the knowledge of genus Eudorella Norman, 1867 (Crustacea, Cumacea, Leuconidae) with description of two new species: Eudorella bacescui n. sp. and Eudorella menziesi n. sp. Travaux du Muséum d'Histoire Naturelle Grigore Antipa 31: 375–385.
- Petrescu, I., (1991). Contributions to the knowledge of the Family Leuconidae (Crustacea, Cumacea) with the description of three new species: Heteroleucon bacescui n. sp,. Leucon adelae n. sp. and Leucon meredithi n. sp. Revue Roumaine de Biologie, Série de Biologie Animale 36: 15–20.
- Petrescu, I., (1992). Leucon savulescu n. sp. (Crustacea, Cumacea) from the Peru-Chile trench. Revue Roumaine de Biologie, Série de Biologie Animale 37 (2): 97–99.
- Petrescu, I., (1992). Iphinoe insolita n. sp. from the littoral waters of Bunaken Island (N. Sulawesi). Expozitie Temporara 21: 4–30.
- Petrescu, I., (1992). The catalogue of the types specimens of the Order Cumacea (Crustacea) from the collections of the 'Grigore Antipa' Natural History Museum (Bucharest). Travaux du Muséum d'Histoire Naturelle Grigore Antipa 32: 267–282.
- Petrescu, I., (1992). Cumacean Newsletter, prepared by R. W. Heard, Gabrielle Meyer, D. C. Roccatagliata, no. 1, 12 pp., 1992. Travaux du Museum d'Histoire Naturelle "Grigore Antipa", 32: 552.
- Petrescu, I., (1993). Leucon michaeli sp. n. (Crustacea, Cumacea) from Peru- Chile Trench (Pacific Ocean). Travaux du Muséum d'Histoire Naturelle Grigore Antipa 33: 367–372.
- Petrescu, I., (1994). Contributions to the knowledge of Leucon genus (Crustacea: Cumacea) from the waters of South America. Travaux du Muséum d'Histoire Naturelle Grigore Antipa 34: 325–345.
- Petrescu, I., (1994). Ordinul Cumacea, in: Diversitatea lumi vii, determinatorul ilustrat al florei si faunei Romaniei, ed. Godeanu S. P., vol. 1 (mediul marin), Editura Bucura Mond, Bucuresti: 291–295.
- Petrescu, I., (1995). New Cumacea (Crustacea: Peracarida) from shallow waters of Indonesia. Beaufortia 45 (3): 27–50.
- Petrescu, I., (1995). Cumaceans (Crustacea, Peracarida) from the South American coasts collected by R/V "Vema". Travaux du Museum d'Histoire Naturelle "Grigore Antipa", 35: 49–86.
- Petrescu, I., (1996). Cumaceans (Crustacea: Cumacea) from Abaco Island (Bahamas). Travaux du Muséum d'Histoire Naturelle Grigore Antipa 36: 157–183.
- Petrescu, I., (1997). Cumacea. Travaux du Muséum d'Histoire Naturelle Grigore Antipa 38: 115–175.
- Petrescu, I., (1997). Nannastacidae (Crustacea: Cumacea) from the Malayan shallow waters (South China Sea). Beaufortia 47 (4): 109–151.
- Petrescu, I., (1998). Cumaceans (Crustacea: Cumacea) collected by the expedition of "Grigore Antipa" Museum of Natural History from the coasts of Tanzania (1973–1974). Part I. Family Bodotriidae. Travaux du Museum National d'Histoire Naturelle "Grigore Antipa", 40: 227–310.
- Petrescu, I., (1998). Cumaceans (Crustacea: Cumacea) collected by the expedition of "Grigore Antipa" Museum of Natural History from the coasts of Tanzania (1973–1974). Part II. Genus Campylaspis Sars, 1865. Travaux du Museum National d'Histoire Naturelle "Grigore Antipa", 41: 281–298.
- Petrescu, I., (2000). Cumacea Crustacea collected from Tanzanian coasts by the 'Grigore Antipa' Museum of Natural History (Romania). Part iii. Genera Cumella Sars, 1865 and Bacescella n. gen. Beaufortia 50 (6): 127–138.
- Petrescu, I., (2000). Additional data on some deep-sea Nannastacidae (Crustacea: Cumacea) collected by R/B Vema . Travaux du Muséum d'Histoire Naturelle Grigore Antipa 62: 55–74.
- Petrescu, I., (2001). New deep-sea Nannastacidae (Crustacea, Cumacea) from the eastern Pacific collected by R.V. Vema. Journal of Natural History 35 (11): 1657–1680.
- Petrescu, I., (2001). Cumacea (Crustacea: Peracarida) collected from Tanzanian coasts by the expedition of Grigore Antipa National Museum of Natural History (Bucharest). Part IV. Genera Nannastacus Bate, 1865, Scherocumella Watling, 1991 and Schizotrema Calman, 1911. Travaux du Muséum d'Histoire Naturelle Grigore Antipa 63: 101–122.
- Petrescu, I., (2001). Redescription of Nannastacus pectinatus occidentalis Bacescu et Muradian, 1975 (Crustacea: Cumacea) based on neotype material. Travaux du Muséum d'Histoire Naturelle Grigore Antipa 63: 123–127.
- Petrescu, I., (2002). Cumacea (Crustacea: Peracarida) from Belize. Travaux du Muséum d'Histoire Naturelle Grigore Antipa 44: 141–203.
- Petrescu, I., (2002). Cumacea (Crustacea: Peracarida) collected from Tanzanian coasts by the expedition of Grigore Antipa National Museum of Natural History (Bucharest). Part V. Families Diastylidae and Gynodiastylidae. Travaux du Muséum d'Histoire Naturelle Grigore Antipa 44: 105–140.
- Petrescu, I., (2002). Cumacea (Crustacea: Peracarida) from Belize. Travaux du Muséum d'Histoire Naturelle Grigore Antipa 64: 141–203.
- Petrescu, I., (2003). First Record of Cumacea (Crustacea: Peracarida) from Madagascar. Travaux du Muséum d'Histoire Naturelle Grigore Antipa 65: 95–115.
- Petrescu, I., (2004). The first mention of the genus Apocuma Jones, 1973 (Crustacea: Cumacea: Bodotriidae) from Australian waters. Travaux du Muséum d'Histoire Naturelle Grigore Antipa 66: 45–54.
- Petrescu, I., (2004). New mentions of cumaceans (Crustacea: Cumacea) in Cuba. Travaux du Muséum d'Histoire Naturelle Grigore Antipa 67: 89–95.
- Petrescu, I. and M. Bacescu, (1991). A new contribution to the knowledge of the cumaceans (Crustacea, Diastylidae) from the Brazilian waters. Travaux du Muséum d'Histoire Naturelle Grigore Antipa 31: 387–395.
- Petrescu, I. and R. W. Heard, (2000). The status of the genus Campylaspis Sars, 1865 (Crustacea: Cumacea) from the Antarctic Ocean. Travaux du Muséum d'Histoire Naturelle Grigore Antipa 62: 75–97.
- Petrescu, I. and R. W. Heard, (2001). Normjonesia danieli, a new genus and species of nannastacid cumacean (Malacostraca: Peracarida) from the Southwest Florida continental shelf. Journal of Crustacean Biology 21 (2): 469–474.
- Petrescu, I. and R. W. Heard, (2004). Redescription of Almyracuma proximoculi Jones & Burbanck, 1959 (Crustacea: Cumacea: Nannastacidae) and description of a new species A. bacescui n. sp. from the Gulf of Mexico. Travaux du Muséum d'Histoire Naturelle Grigore Antipa 67: 97–109.
- Petrescu, I. and R. W. Heard, (2005). Cumacea (Crustacea: Malacostraca: Peracarida) of the Gulf of Mexico. I. A new species of Sympodomma Stebbing, 1912 (Bodotriidae: Vaunthomsoniinae)
- Petrescu, I. and T. M. Iliffe, (1992). Contributions to the knowledge of the cumacean species (Crustacea, Cumacea) of British blue holes (Andros Island, Bahamas Islands). Travaux du Muséum d'Histoire Naturelle Grigore Antipa 32: 283–301.
- Petrescu, I., T. M. Iliffe, et al.., (1993). Contributions to the knowledge of Cumacea (Crustacea) from the littoral waters of Jamaica Island, including the description of three new species. Travaux du Muséum d'Histoire Naturelle Grigore Antipa 33: 373–395.
- Petrescu, I., T. M. Iliffe, et al.., (1994). Contributions to the knowledge of cumaceans (Crustacea) from Jamaica II, five new species of the Genus Cumella. Travaux du Muséum d'Histoire Naturelle Grigore Antipa 34: 347–367.
- Petrescu, I. & Platvoet, D. (1995) The catalogue of the Cumacean collection (Crustacea: Peracarida) of the Instituut voor Systematiek en Populatie biologie (Zoölogisch Museum) of Amsterdam (The Netherlands). Travaux du Museum d'Histoire Naturelle "Grigore Antipa", 35: 87–98.
- Petrescu, I. and W. Sterrer, (2001). Cumacea (Crustacea) from shallow waters of Bermuda. Annals Naturhist. Museum Wien 103 B: 89–128.
- Petrescu, I. & Watling, L., (1999). Revision of genus Americuma Watling, 1991 (Crustacea: Cumacea) with the redescription of Styloptocuma heardi (Băcescu, 1979) based on neotype material. Travaux du Museum National d'Histoire Naturelle Grigore Antipa 41: 299–308.
- Petrescu, I. and K. J. Wittmann, (2003). Elements for a revision and notes on bionomy of the Cumacea (Crustacea: Peracarida) of the Weddell Sea, Antarctica. Zool. Med. Leiden 77 (34): 557–630.

== Q ==
- Quijón, P.A., & P.V.R. Snelgrove., (2005). Predation regulation of sedimentary faunal structure: potential effects of a fishery-induced switch in predators in a Newfoundland sub-Arctic fjord. Oecologia 144 (1): 125–136.
- Quintana, R., (1986). Las comunidades bentonicas antarticas. Boletin Antartico Chileno 6 (1): 44–54.

== R ==
- Rachor, E., Arntz, W.E., Rumohr, H., and Mantau, K-H., (1982). Seasonal and long-term population fluctuations in Diastylis rathkei (Crustacea: Cumacea) on Kiel Bay and German Bight Netherlands Journal of Sea Research 16: 141 -150.
- Radha Devi, A. & Kurian, C.V., (1981). Bodotria platybasis sp. nov. (Crustacea-Cumacea) from the Indian Seas. Bulletin of the Department of Marine Science, University of Cochin 12 (1): 23–28.
- Radha Devi, A. & Kurian, C.V., (1981). Three new species of Cumacea from the Gulf of Mexico. Bulletin of the Department of Marine Science, University of Cochin 12 (1): 53–64.
- Radha Devi, A. & Kurian, C.V., (1986). Report on the international Indian Ocean expedition collections of Cumacea in the Smithsonian Institution, Washington. Journal of the Marine Biology Association of India 22 (1–2): 110–122.
- Radha Devi, A. & Kurian, C.V., (1989). A Collection of Cumacea from the South West and South East. 1–37.
- Rehm, P., (2008). Description of a new subspecies Diastylis enigmatica rossensis (Crustacea: Peracarida: Cumacea) from the Ross Sea, Antarctica. Helgoland Marine Research. doi:10.1007/s10152-008-0141-8.
- Rehm, P., & Heard, R., (2008). Leucon (Crymoleucon) rossi, a new species (Crustacea: Cumacea: Leuconidae) from the shelf waters of the Ross Sea (Antarctica), with a key to the genus Leucon south of 60°S. Scientia Marina, 72 (4). doi:10.3989/scimar.2008.72n4683
- Rehm, P., S. Thatje, U. Mühlenhardt-Siegel and A. Brandt (2007). Composition and distribution of the peracarid crustacean fauna along a latitudinal transect off Victoria Land (Ross Sea, Antarctica) with special emphasis on the Cumacea. Polar Biology 30 (7): 871–881
- Reyss, D., (1972). Résultats scientifiques de la campagne du N. M. Jean Charcot en Méditerranée occidentale, Mai-Juin-Juillet 1970. Crustaceana 22: 362–377.
- Reyss, D., (1974). Contribution a l'etude des Cumacés de profondeur de ;'Atlantique nord: le Genre Makrokylindrus Stebbing. Crustaceana 26 (1): 5–28.
- Reyss, D., (1975). Deux Cumacés nouveaux de a'Atlantique tropical: Atlantistylis chauvini n. g,. n. sp. (Diastylidae) et Pseudodiastylis delamarei n. sp, (Lampropidae). Crustaceana 28 (2): 168–179.
- Reyss, D., (1978). Cumacés de profondeur de l'Atlantique nord, Famille de Lampropidae. Crustaceana 35 (1): 1–21.
- Reyss, D., (1979). Contribution a l'étude des Cumacés de profondeur en Atlantique: le Genre Diastyloides Sars, 1900. Crustaceana 27 (3): 285–293.
- Reyss, D. and J. Soyer, (1966). Cumacés recueillis lors de la campagne de la Calypso à Port-Vendres en août-septembre 1964. Bulletin de d'Institut Océanographique 66 (1372): 3–11.
- Roccatagliata, D., (1981). Claudicuma platensis get. et. sp. nov. (Crustacea: Cumacea) de la ribera Argentina del Rio de la Plata. Physis, Buenos Aires, Sec. B 39 (97): 79–87.
- Roccatagliata, D., (1985). Three new specie of the genus Cyclaspis (Cumacea) from the South-West Atlantic with a redescription of Cyclaspis platymerus Zimmer, 1944. Crustaceana 49 (8): 177–192.
- Roccatagliata, D., (1986). On some Cyclaspis (Cumacea) from the South American Atlantic coast with the description of two new species. Crustaceana 50 (2): 113–132.
- Roccatagliata, D., (1987). Four Cyclaspis species (Cumacea) from the south American Atlantic coast. Crustaceana 52 (1): 61–77.
- Roccatagliata, D., (1989). The genus Cyclaspis (Cumacea): a new species and additional records of distribution. Crustaceana 56 (1): 39–46.
- Roccatagliata, D., (1991). Claudicuma platense Roccatagliata, 1981 (Cumacea): A new reproductive pattern. Journal of Crustacean Biology 11 (1): 113–122.
- Roccatagliata, D., (1993). On two Southwest Atlantic species of the genus Leptocuma Sars, 1873 (Crustacea: Cumacea). Journal of Natural History 27: 299–312.
- Roccatagliata, D., (1994). Two Paralamprops species (Crustacea: Cumacea) from the deep Atlantic. Cahier Biologie Marin 35: 415–430.
- Roccatagliata, D., (1997). A new species of Leptocuma Sars, 1873 (Cumacea) from the South American Atlantic coast. Crustaceana 70 (5): 543–552.
- Roccatagliata, D., (1997). On the genus Anchistylis (Crustacea, Cumacea) from the South-West Atlantic. Cahier Biologie Marina 38: 35–42.
- Roccatagliata, D. and R. W. Heard, (1992). Diastylopsis goeckei, a new species (Crustacea: Cumacea: Diastylidae) from Antarctic waters. Proceedings of the Biological Society of Washington 105 (4): 743–752.
- Roccatagliata, D. & P. Soares-Moreira, (1987). Four Cyclaspis species (Cumacea) from the South American Atlantic coast. Crustaceana 52: 62–67.
- Roccatagliata, D. and U. Mühlenhardt-Siegel, (2000). Remarks on the taxonomy of the genus Ekleptostylis Stebbing, 1912 (Crustacea: Cumacea: Diastylidae). Proceedings of the Biological Society of Washington 113 (3): 696–709.

== S ==
- Sars, G. O., (1865). Om den aberrante Drebsdygruppe Cumacea og dens nordiske arter. Förhadlingar i Videnskabs-Selskabet i Christiania 1864: 128–208.
- Sars, G. O., (1869). Undersogelser over Christianafjordens Dybvands-fauna. Nyt Magazin for Naturvidenskaberne 16: 305–362.
- Sars, G. O., (1870). Beskrivelse af de paa fregatten josephines expedition fundne Cumaceer. Kuncl Svenska Vetenskaps Akademiens Handlingar 9 (13): 3–57.
- Sars, G. O., (1870). Nye Dybvands-Crustaceer fra Lofoten. Forhandlinger i Videnskaps-Selskapet in Kristiania 1869: 158–165.
- Sars, G. O., (1871). Nya arter af Cumacea samlade under K. Svenska Korvetten Josephines Expedition i Atlantiska Oceanen år 1869 af F. A. Smitt och A. Ljungman. Öfversigt af Kongl. Vetenskaps-Akademiens Förhandlingar 1: 71–81.
- Sars, G. O., (1873). Beskrivelse af syv nye Cumaceer fravestindien og det syd- Atlantiske Ocean. Kongl Svenska Vetenskaps-Akademiens Handlingar 11 (5): 3–30.
- Sars, G. O., (1878). Nye Bidrah til Kundskaben om Middelhavets Invertebratfauna. II. Middelhavets Cumaceer. Separataftryk af Archiv for Mathematik og Naturvidenskab 3: 461–512.
- Sars, G. O., (1879). Middelhavets Cumaceer. Kundskaben om Middelhavets Invertebratafauna: 178–196.
- Sars, G. O., (1886). Report on the Cumacea collected by H.M.S. Challenger during the years 1873–1876. Zoological Reports of the Challenger Expedition 55: 1–73, plates 1–11.
- Sars, G. O., (1887). Report on the Cumacea collected by H.M.S. Challenger during the years 1873–76. Rep. Sci. Res. Voyage H.M.S. Challenger 19: 1–78 plates 1–10.
- Sars, G. O., (1894). Contributions to the knowledge of the carcinological fauna of the Caspian Sea, by G. O. Sars, Prof. of Zoology at the University of Christiania, Norway. Bulletin de l'Académie Impériale des Science de St. Pétersbourg 13: 463–498.
- Sars, G. O., (1896). Contributions to the knowledge of the carcinological fauna of the Caspian Sea, by G. O. Sars, Prof. of Zoology at the University of Christiania, Norway. Bulletin de l'Académie Impériale des Science de St. Pétersbourg 36: 297–338.
- Sars, G. O., (1897). On some additional Crustacea from the Caspian Sea. Annuaire du Musée Zoologique de l'Académie, Impériale des Sciences de St. Pétersbourg 2: 273–305.
- Sars, G. O., (1900). An account of the Crustacea of Norway: Cumacea, Bergen Museum.
- Sars, G. O., (1914) Report on the Cumacea of the Caspian Expedition 1904. Trudy Kaspjiskoj Ekspeditij 1904 4 (2): 1–32.
- Say, T., (1818). An Account of the Crustacea of the United States (continued). Journal of the Academy of Natural Sciences of Philadelphia 1 (4): 313–319.
- Scott, T., (1901). Notes on gatherings of Crustacea, collected for the most part by the Fishery Steamer Garland and the Steam Trawler St Andrew of Aberdeen and examined during the year 1900. Rep. Fish. Bd. Scotl. 19: 235–281, pls 17, 18
- Shalla, S. H. and J. D. Bishop, (2004). Four new species of the genus Leucon (Crustacea: Cumacea) from the Atlantic Frontier Margin. Journal of the Marine Biological Association of the United Kingdom 84 (1): 139–153.
- Shalla, S.H., Bishop, J.D., (2005). First record of the genus Atlantistylis Reyss, 1975 (Crustacea: Cumacea) from the North Atlantic, with the description of a new species. Journal of Natural History, 39 (18): 1483–1489.
- Shalla, S.H., Bishop, J.D., (2007). Lampropidae (Crustacea: Cumacea) from the deep north-east Atlantic and the North Sea, with two new species of Hemilamprops and Mesolamprops. J. Mar. Biol. Assoc. U. K. 87 (5): 1191–1200.
- Simpson, K. W., J. P. Fagnani, D. M. DeNicola & R. W. Bode, (1985). Widespread distribution of some estuarine crustaceans (Cyathura polita, Chiridotea almyra, Almyracuma proximoculi) in the limnetic zone of the Lower Hudson River, New York. Estuaries 8: 373–380.
- Sourinstay, V., (1894). Cumacea, les Crustacés de la mer d'Azon. Memoirs of the Kiev Soux of Naturalists: 358–371.
- Stappers, L., (1907). Crustacés Malacostracés. Campagne Arctique de 1907: 99–123.
- Stebbing, T. R. R., (1910). General catalogue of South African Crustacea. (Part V of S.A. Crustacea, for the marine investigations of South Africa.)

Ann. S. Afr. Mus. 6 (4): 281–593, pis. 41–48.

- Stebbing, T. R. R., (1912). Historic doubts about Vaunthompsonia. Proceedings of the Linnean Society of London 124: 78–79.
- Stebbing, T. R. R., (1912). The Sympoda, Part 6. Annals of the South African Museum 10: 129–176.
- Stebbing, T. R. R., (1913). Cumacea. Das Tierreich 39: 1–210.
- Stephensen, K., (1915). Isopoda, Tanaidacea, Cumacea, Amphipoda (excl. Hyperiidea). Report on the Danish Oceanographical Expeditions 1908–1910 to the Mediterranean and Adjacent Seas 2: 29–34.
- Stephensen, K., (1943). Leptostraca, Mysidacea, Cumacea, Tanaidacea, Isopoda, and Euphausiacea. Kommissionen for Videnskabelige UndersOgelser I Gronland 10: 3–82.
- Steuer, A., (1936). Cumacea und Stomatopoda von Alexandrien in Ägypten. Notizen des Deutsch-Italienischen Institutes Für Meeresbiologie in Rovigno D'Istria 21: 3–19.
- Stoddart, H.E., & Lowry, J.K., (2003). Cumacea. Pp. 373–418 in: Beesley, P.L., and Houston, W.W.K. (eds), Zoological Catalogue of Australia. Crustacea: Malacostraca: Peracarida: Amphipoda, Cumacea, Mysidacea. CSIRO Publishing: Melbourne.

== T ==
- Tafe, D. J. and J. G. Greenwood, (1996). A new species of Schizotrema (Cumacea: Nannastacidae) from Moreton Bay, Queensland. Memoirs of the Queensland Museum 39 (2): 381–389.
- Tafe, D. J. and J. G. Greenwood, (1996). The Bodotriidae (Crustacea: Cumacea) of Moreton Bay, Queensland. Memoirs of the Queensland Museum 39 (2): 391–482.
- Thomson, G. M., (1892). On the occurrence of two species of Cumacea in New Zealand. Journal of the Linnean Society of London, Zoology 24: 264–268.
- Toulmond, A. & Truchot, J.-P., (1964) Inventaire de la faune marine de Roscoff, Amphipodes –Cumacés. Supplément aux travaux de la station biologique de Roscoff 15: 1–42.
- Tzareva, L. A., (1999). The systematic position of the cumacean Lamprops (?) japonica. Biologiya Morya 25 (5): 400–402.
- Tzareva, L. A. and S. V. Vassilenko, (1993). Four new species of Cumacea from Peter the Great Bay, Sea of Japan. Asian Marine Biology 10: 13–26.

== U ==
- Uéno, M., (1933). Inland water fauna of the North Kurile Islands. Bulletin of the Biogeographical Society of Japan 4 (3): 171–212 (plates 16–18).
- Uéno, M., (1935). Crustacea collected in the lakes of southern Sakhalin. Annotationes Zoologicae Japonenses 15 (1): 88–94.
- Uéno, M., (1936). Crustacea Malacostraca of the northern Kurile Islands (Inland water fauna of the Kurile Islands II). Bulletin of the Biogeographical Society of Japan 6 (26): 241–246.
- Usakov P.V., (1953). Fauna Ohotskogo moria i usloviia ee susscestvovania. Akad. Nauk., Moscow Vader, W., & W.J. Wolff. 1973. The Cumacea of the estuarine area of the rivers Rhine, Meuse and Scheldt (Crustacea, Malacostraca). Netherlands Journal of Sea Research 6 (3): 365–375.
- Usakov, P.V., (1948). Fauna bezpovzvonocinîh Amurskogo limana... Vol. Hommage à Zernov. Moscow:175–191.

== V ==
- Van Beneden, P.-J. (1861). Recherches sur les Crustacés du littoral de Belgique. [Research on the Crustacea of the Belgian coast]. Mémoires de l'Académie Royale des Sciences, des Lettres et des Beaux-Arts de Belgique XXXIII: 1–174, plates I-XXI.
- Vassilenko, S., (1989). Composition and distribution of Cumacea on the Sakhalin shelf of the Sea of Okhotsk. Biologiya Morya 6: 15–21.
- Vassilenko, S. V., (1988). Hemilamprops canadensis n.sp. from the Arctic Ocean. Zoological Journal Moskwa 67 (6): 945–949.
- Vassilenko, S. V. and L. A. Tzareva, (1990). New species of Cumacea from the south part of Peter the Great Bay (Japan Sea). Proceedings of the Zoological Institute, Leningrad 218: 54–74.
- Vassilenko, S. V. and L. A. Tzareva, (2006). Two new species of Cumacea (Malacostraca, Peracarida) from Peter The Great Bay (Sea of Japan). Zootaxa 1174: 41–48
- Verrill, A. E., (1923). Crustacea of Bermuda. Transactions of the Connecticut Academy of Arts and Sciences 26: 181–211.

== W ==
- Watling, L., (1977). Two new genera and a new subfamily of Bodotriidae (Crustacea: Cumacea) from Eastern North America. Proceedings of the Biological Society of Washington 89 (52): 593–598.
- Watling, L., (1979). Marine Flora and Fauna of the Northeastern United States. Crustacea: Cumacea. National Oceanic and Atmospheric Administration Technical Report, National Marine Fisheries Circular 423 (1–23).
- Watling, L., (1989). A classification system for crustacean setae based on the homology concept. Functional morphology of feeding and grooming in Crustacea. B. E. Felgenhauer, L. Watling and A. B. Thistle. Rotterdam, A.A. Balkema. 6: 15–26.
- Watling, L., (1991). Rediagnosis and revision of some Nannastacidae (Crustacea: Cumacea). Proceedings of the Biological Society of Washington 104 (4): 751–757.
- Watling, L., (1991). Revision of the cumacean Family Leuconidae. Journal of Crustacean Biology 11 (4): 569–582.
- Watling, L. and O. Breedy, (1988). A new cumacean (Crustacea) genus from beaches of Golfo de Nicoya, Costa Rica. Revista Biologia Tropica 36: 527–533.
- Watling, L. and S. Gerken, (1999). Leucon (Crymoleucon) noerrevangi, a new species of leuconid (Cumacea: Crustacea) from the Faroe Islands. Sarsia 84 (5): 437–444.
- Watling, L. and S. Gerken, (1999). Two new cumacean (Crustacea) species from the deep South Atlantic. Zoosystema. 21 (4): 661–669.
- Watling, L. and S. Gerken, (2001). Humesiana, a remarkable new cumacean genus from the Caribbean Sea. Journal of Crustacean Biology 21 (1): 243–248.
- Watling, L. and S. Gerken, (2005). The Cumacea of the Faroe Islands Region: Water Mass Relationships and North Atlantic Biogeography. Frodskaparrit.
- Watling, L., S. Gerken, et al.., (2003). The Cumacea. DELTA database and INTKEY illustrated, interactive key to the crustacean order Cumacea.
- Watling, L. and L. D. McCann, (1997). Cumacea. Taxonomic Atlas of the Benthic Fauna of the Santa Maria Basin and Western Santa Barbara Channel. Santa Barbara Museum of Natural History. 11: 121–180.
- Wirkner C.S. & S. Richter (2007). Morphology of the haemolymph vascular system in Tanaidacea and Cumacea: –Implications for the relationships of "core group" Peracarida (Malacostraca; Crustacea). Arthropod Structure & Development 37 (2): 141–154

== X ==
- Xu Zhao-Li, Wang Yun-Long (2006). Investigation on Pelagic Isopoda and Cumacea in the East China Sea Chinese Journal of Zoology.

== Y ==
- Yoda, M., and Aoki, M., (2002). Comparative study of benthic and pelagic populations of Bodotria similis (Cumacea) from Uzu Peninsula, Southern Japan. Journal of Crustacean Biology 22: 543–552.

== Z ==
- Zimmer, C., (1902). Cumaceen. Hamburger Magalhaensischen Sammelreise: 1–18.
- Zimmer, C., (1902). Die von Professor Dr. Thilenius gesammelten Cumaceen. Zoologischen Jahrbüchern Systematik 17 (3): 444–456.
- Zimmer, C., (1903). Die Cumaceen des Museums für Naturkunde in Berlin. Zoologische Jahrbücher, Abtheilung für Systematik, Geographie und Biologie der Thiere: 664–694.
- Zimmer, C., (1907). Neue Cumaceen aus den Familien Diastylidae und Leuconidae von der Deutschen und Schwedischen Südpolar. Sonderabdruck aus dem Zoologischen Anzeiger 31 (7): 220–229.
- Zimmer, C., (1907). California Crustacea of the Order Cumacea. Proceedings of the National Museum 83: 423–439.
- Zimmer, C., (1907). Neue Cumaceen von der Deutschen und der Swedischen Sudpolar Expedition aus der Familien der Cumiden, Vaunthomsoniiden, Nannastaciden und Lampropiden. Zoologischer Anzeiger 31: 367–374.
- Zimmer, C., (1908). Die Cumaceen der Deutschen Tiefsee-Expedition . Wissenschaftliche Ergebnisse der deutschen Tiefsee-Expedition auf dem Dampfer Valdivia 1898–1899 8: 158–196.
- Zimmer, C., (1909). Die Cumaceen der Schwedischen Südpolar-expedition. Wissenschaftliche Ergebnisse der Schwedischen Südpolar-Expedition 1901–1903 6: 1–31.
- Zimmer, C., (1913). Die Cumaceen. Deutschen Südpolar-expedition, (1901–1903) 14 (3): 437–491.
- Zimmer, C., (1914). Cumacea. Die Fauna Südwest-Australiens 5 (176–195).
- Zimmer, C., (1916). Crustacea IV: Cumacea und Schizopoda. Bert. zur Kenntnis der Meersfauna Westafrikas, Homburg: 55–66.
- Zimmer, C., (1921). Mitteilung über Cumaceen des Berliner Zoologischen Museums Mitteilungen aus dem Zoolog. Berlin Museum 10: 115–149.
- Zimmer, C., (1921). Einige neue und weniger bekannte Cumaceen des Schwedischen reichsmuseums. Arkiv För Zoologi 13 (21): 1–9.
- Zimmer, C., (1921). Results of Dr. E. Mjöberg's Swedish scientific expeditions to Australia 1910–13 XXVI. Cumaceen. K. Sven. Vetensk.-Akad. Handl. 61: 1–13
- Zimmer, C., (1926). Northern and Arctic invertebrates in the collection of the Swedish State Museum (Riksmuseum). Kungl. Svenska Vetenskapsakademiens Handlingar 3: 1–88.
- Zimmer, C., (1930). Untersuchungen an Diastyliden (Ordnung Cumacea). Mitteilungen aus dem Zoolog. Berlin Museum 16 (4): 583–658.
- Zimmer, C., (1934). Die Cumaceen der norwegischen Expeditionen nach Ostgrönland 1929, 1930, 1931, and 1932. Skr. Svalbard 61: 34–40.
- Zimmer, C., (1936). California Crustacea of the Order Cumacea. Proceedings of the United States National Museum 83 (2992): 423–439.
- Zimmer, C., (1939). Pazifische Cumaceen. Exp. Mers URSS 23: 38–54, plates 1–17.
- Zimmer, C., (1940). Die verbreitung der Cumaceen. Archiv für Naturgeschichte 9 (2): 226–313.
- Zimmer, C., (1941). Cumacea. Leipzig, Akademische Verlagsgesellschaft Becker & Erler.
- Zimmer, C., (1942). Die Gattung Iphinoe (Ord. Cumacea, Fam. Bodotriidae). Zoologischer Anzeiger 139 (9–10): 190–200.
- Zimmer, C., (1943). Über neue und weniger bekannte Cumaceen. Zoologischer Anzeiger 141 (7–8): 148–167.
- Zimmer, C., (1943). Cumaceen des Stillen Ozeans. Archiv für Naturgeschichte 12: 130–174.
- Zimmer, C., (1944). Cumaceen des tropischen Westatlantiks. Zoologischer Anzeiger 144: 121–137.
- Zimmer, C., (1952). Indochinesische Cumaceen. Mitteilungen aus dem Zoologischen Museum in Berlin 28: 5–35.
- Zimmer, C., (1980). Cumaceans of the American Atlantic Boreal Coast region (Crustacea: Peracarida), ed. T. E. Bowman and L. Watling. Smithsonian Contributions to Zoology 302: 1–27.
