= List of mammals of Chile =

This is a list of the mammal species recorded in Chile. As of January 2011, there are 152 mammal species listed for Chile, of which four are critically endangered, eight are endangered, eight are vulnerable, and eleven are near threatened. (Note: This list is derived from the IUCN Red List which lists species of mammals and includes those mammals that have recently been classified as extinct (since 1500 AD). The taxonomy and naming of the individual species are based on those used in existing Wikipedia articles as of 21 May 2007 and supplemented by the common names and taxonomy from the IUCN, Smithsonian Institution, or the University of Michigan where no Wikipedia article was available. The list was updated in January 2011.)

The following tags are used to highlight each species' conservation status as assessed by the International Union for Conservation of Nature; those on the left are used here, those in the second column are used in some other articles:

EX	EX	Extinct	No reasonable doubt that the last individual has died.
EW	EW	Extinct in the wild	Known only to survive in captivity or as a naturalized population well outside its historic range.
CR	CR	Critically endangered	The species is in imminent danger of extinction in the wild.
EN	EN	Endangered	The species is facing a very high risk of extinction in the wild.
VU	VU	Vulnerable	The species is facing a high risk of extinction in the wild.
NT	NT	Near threatened	The species does not qualify as being at high risk of extinction but is likely to do so in the future.
LC	LC	Least concern	The species is not currently at risk of extinction in the wild.
DD	DD	Data deficient	There is inadequate information to assess the risk of extinction for this species.
NE	NE	Not evaluated	The conservation status of the species has not been studied.

== Subclass: Theria ==
=== Infraclass: Metatheria ===
==== Superorder: Ameridelphia ====
===== Order: Didelphimorphia (common opossums) =====
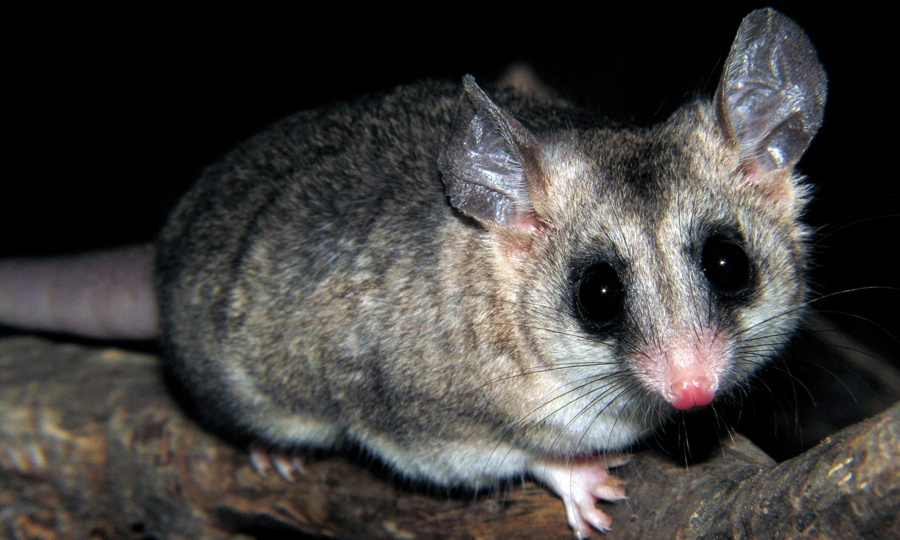
Elegant fat-tailed mouse opossum

Didelphimorphia is the order of common opossums of the Western Hemisphere. Opossums probably diverged from the basic South American marsupials in the late Cretaceous or early Paleocene. They are small to medium-sized marsupials, about the size of a large house cat, with a long snout and prehensile tail.

- Family: Didelphidae (American opossums)
  - Subfamily: Didelphinae
    - Genus: Thylamys
      - Elegant fat-tailed mouse opossum, Thylamys elegans LC
      - White-bellied fat-tailed mouse opossum, Thylamys pallidior LC

===== Order: Paucituberculata (shrew opossums) =====
There are six extant species of shrew opossum. They are small shrew-like marsupials confined to the Andes.

- Family: Caenolestidae
  - Genus: Rhyncholestes
    - Long-nosed caenolestid, R. raphanurus NT

==== Superorder: Australidelphia ====
===== Order: Microbiotheria (monito del monte) =====
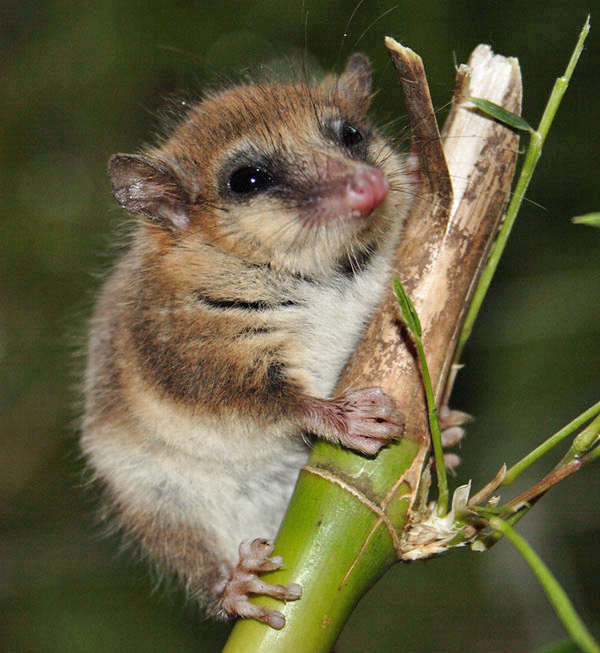
Monito del monte on bamboo

The monito del monte is the only extant member of its family and the only surviving member of an ancient order, Microbiotheria. It appears to be more closely related to Australian marsupials than to other Neotropic marsupials; this is a reflection of the South American origin of all Australasian marsupials.

- Family: Microbiotheriidae
  - Genus: Dromiciops
    - Monito del monte, D. gliroides NT

=== Infraclass: Eutheria ===
==== Superorder: Xenarthra ====
===== Order: Cingulata (armadillos) =====
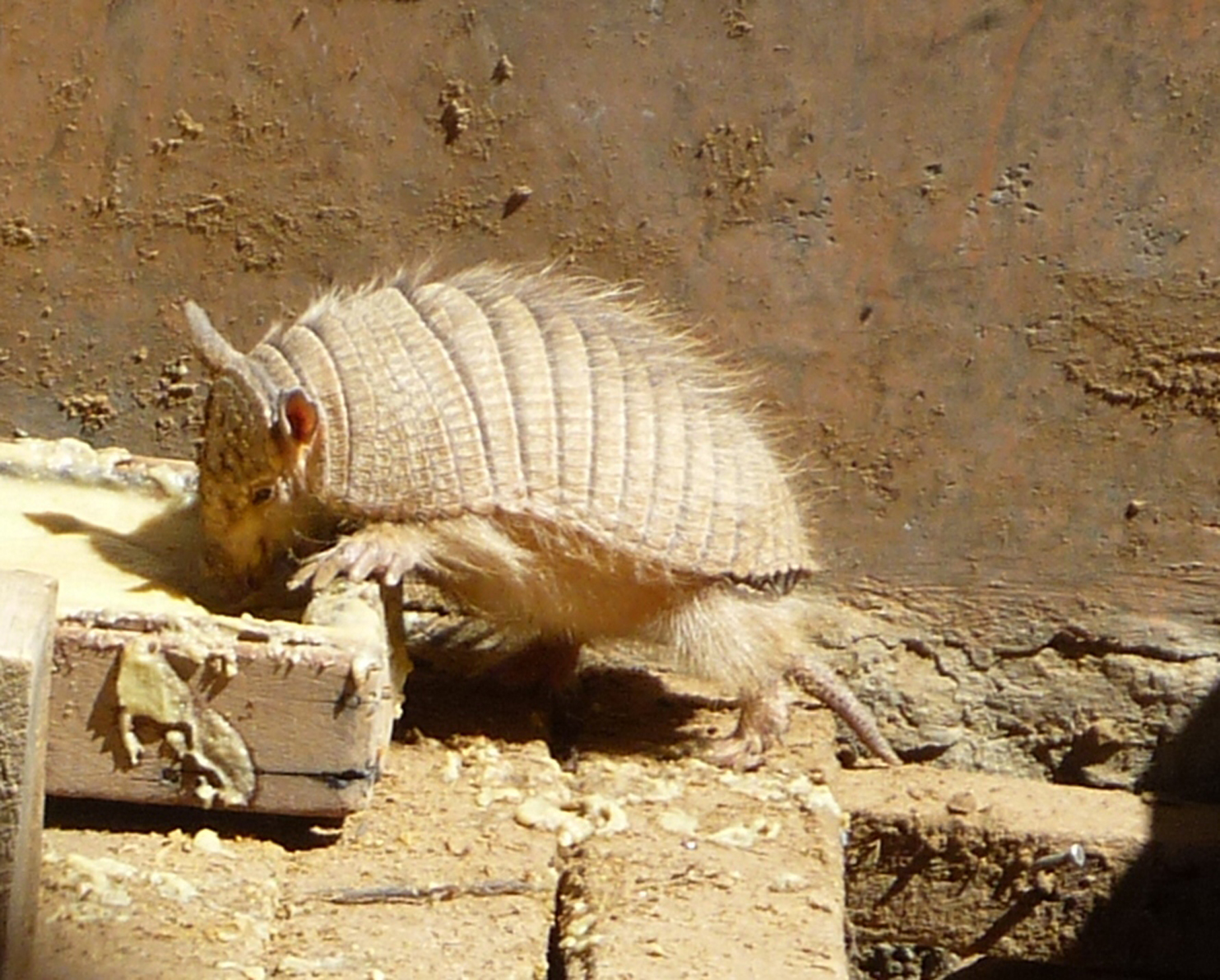
Andean hairy armadillo

Armadillos are small mammals with a bony armored shell. There are 21 extant species in the Americas, 19 of which are only found in South America, where they originated. Their much larger relatives, the pampatheres and glyptodonts, once lived in North and South America but became extinct following the appearance of humans.

- Family: Chlamyphoridae (armadillos)
  - Subfamily: Euphractinae
    - Genus: Chaetophractus
      - Andean hairy armadillo, Chaetophractus nationi VU
      - Big hairy armadillo, Chaetophractus villosus LC
    - Genus: Zaedyus
      - Pichi, Zaedyus pichiy NT

==== Superorder: Euarchontoglires ====
===== Order: Rodentia (rodents) =====
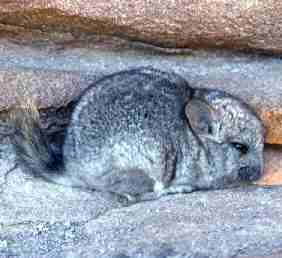
Short-tailed chinchilla

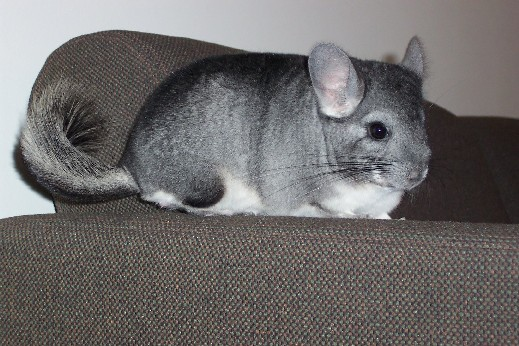
Long-tailed chinchilla

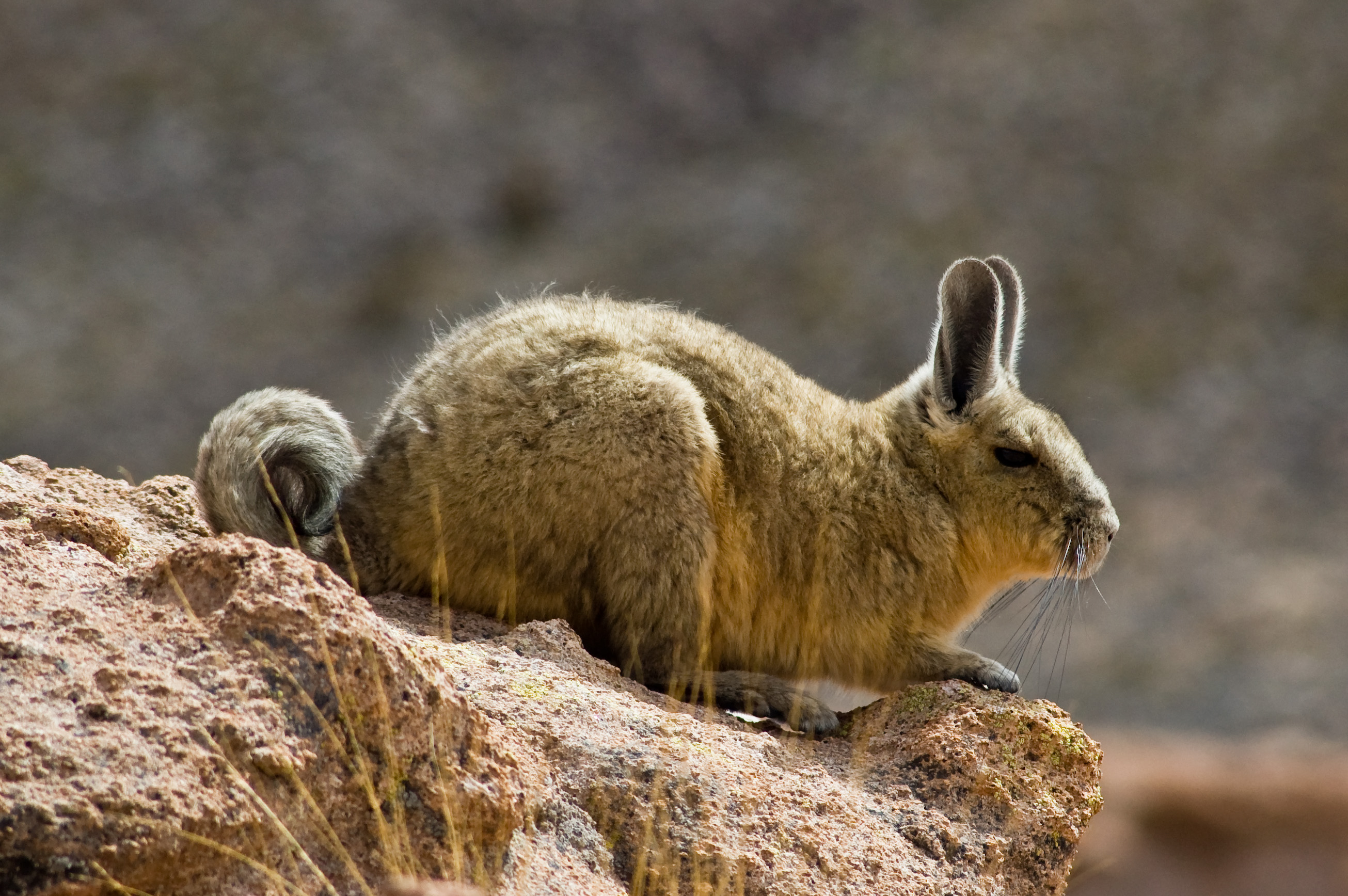
Southern viscacha

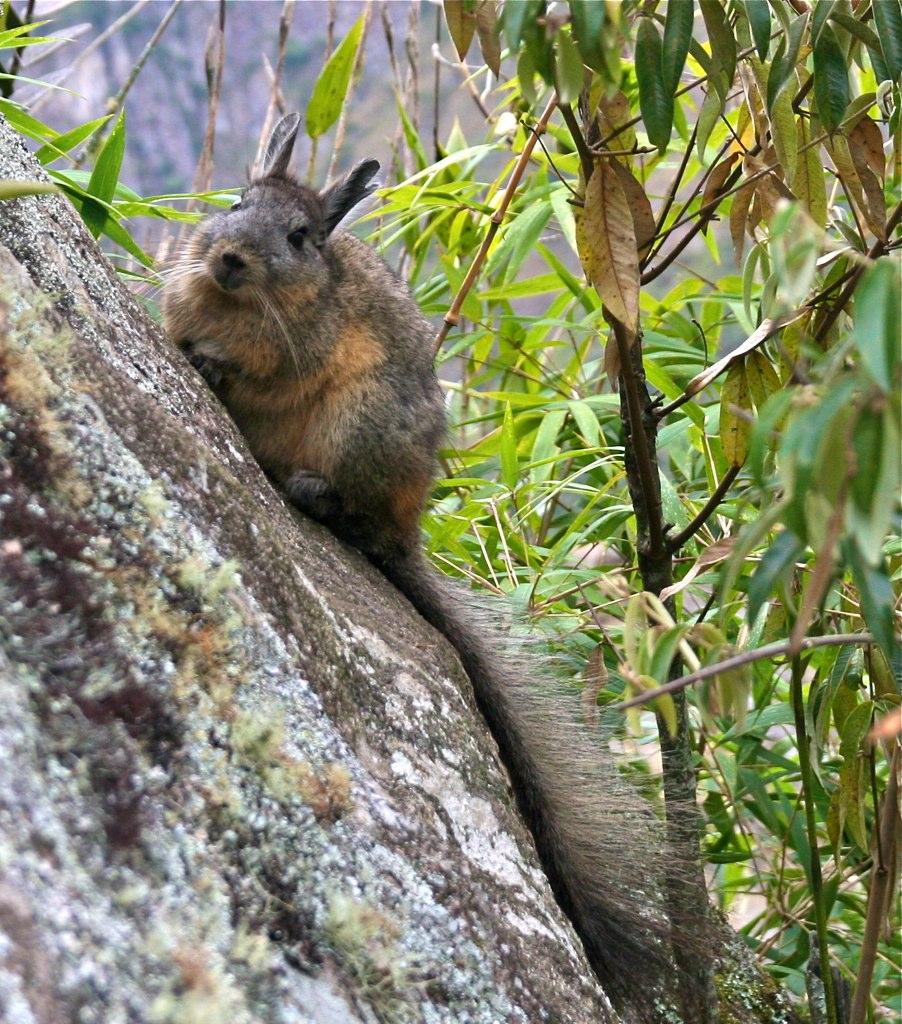
Northern viscacha

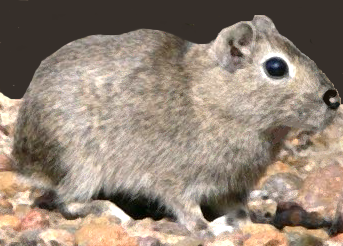
Southern mountain cavy

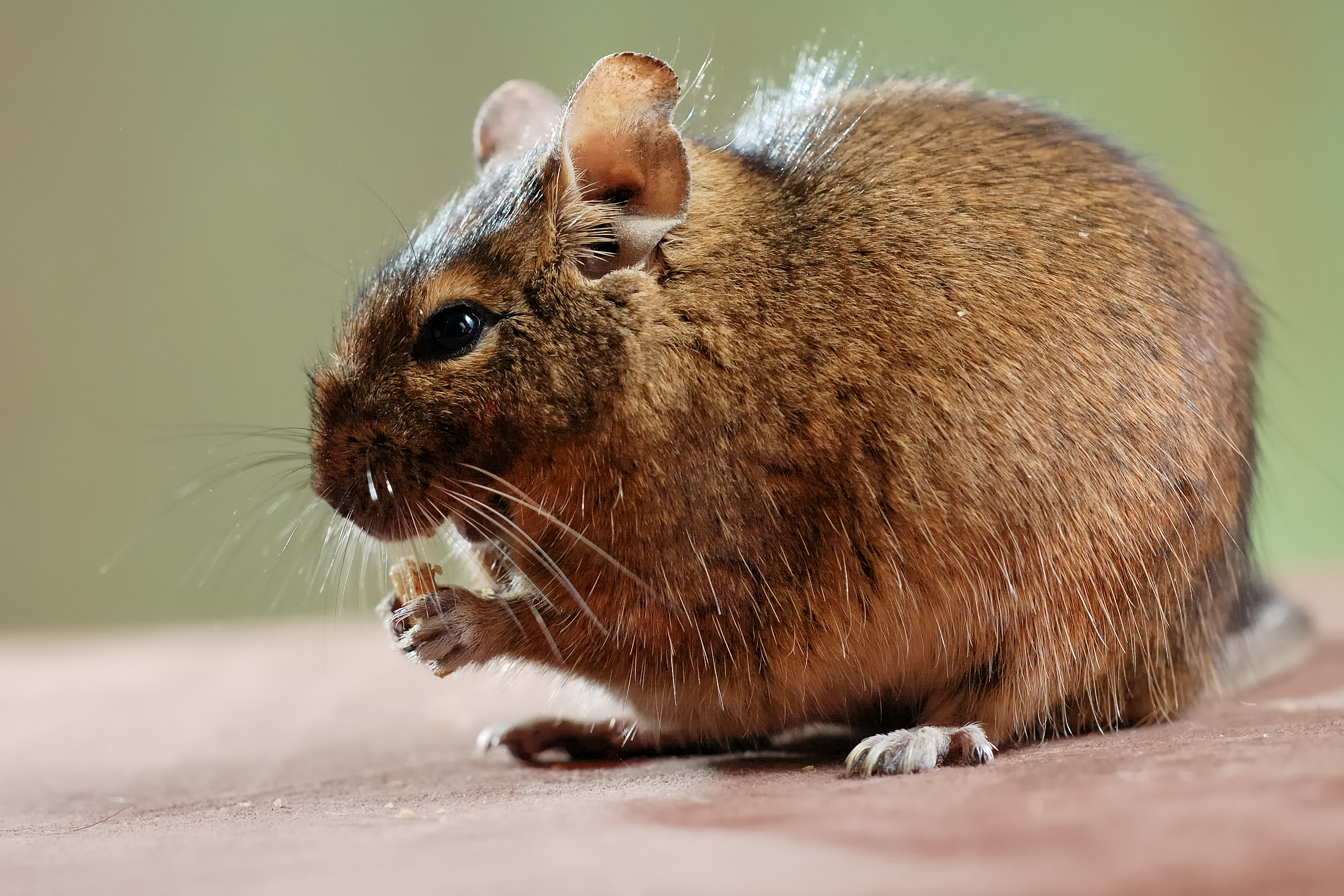
Common degu

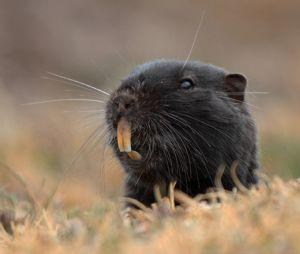
Coruro

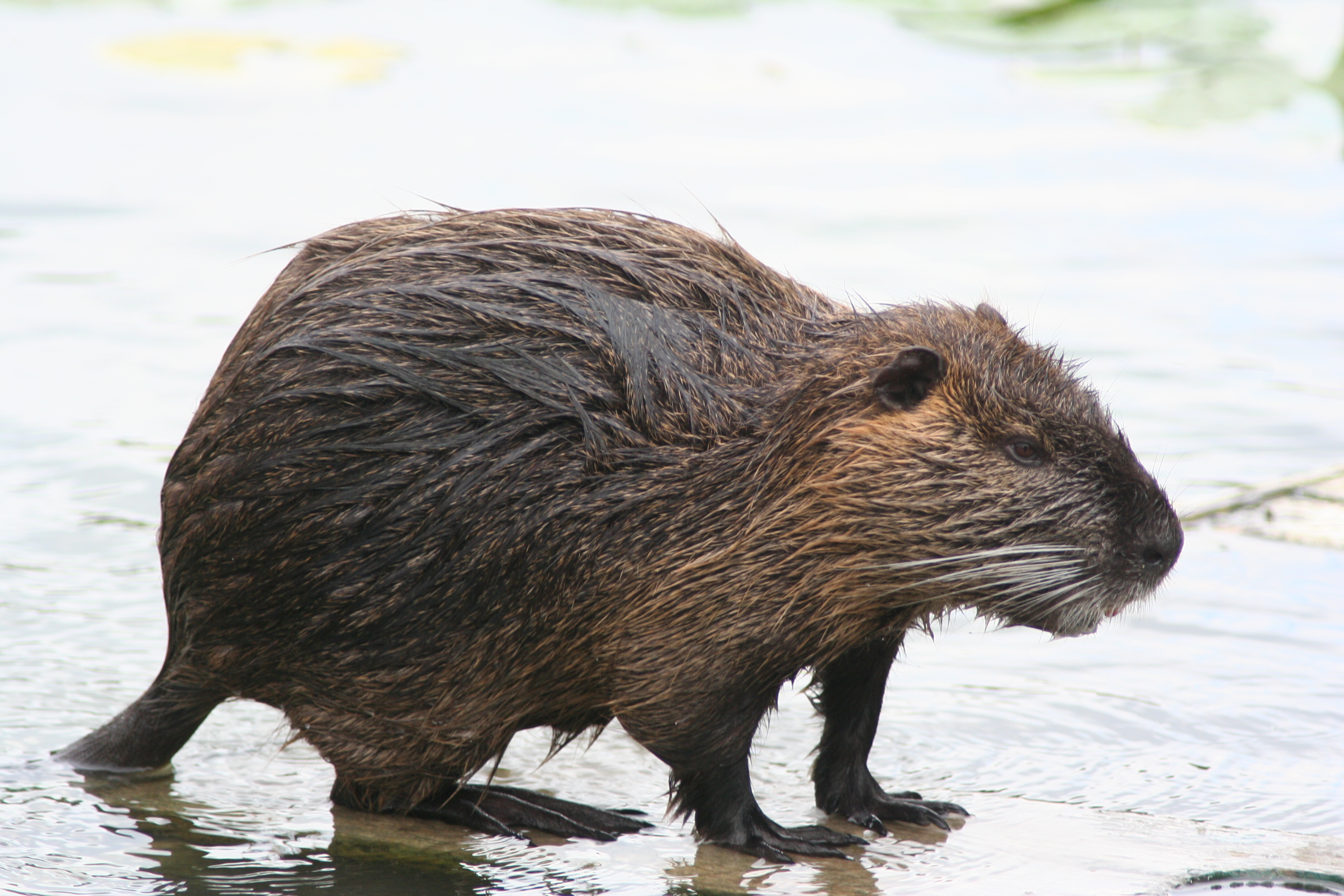
Coypu

Rodents make up the largest order of mammals, with over 40% of mammalian species. They have two incisors in the upper and lower jaw which grow continually and must be kept short by gnawing. Most rodents are small though the capybara can weigh up to 45 kg (99 lb).

- Suborder: Hystricognathi
  - Family: Chinchillidae (viscachas and chinchillas)
    - Genus: Chinchilla
      - Short-tailed chinchilla, Chinchilla brevicaudata CR
      - Long-tailed chinchilla, Chinchilla lanigera CR
    - Genus: Lagidium
      - Southern viscacha, Lagidium viscacia LC
      - Northern viscacha, Lagidium peruanum LC
      - Wolffsohn's viscacha, Lagidium wolffsohni DD
  - Family: Caviidae (guinea pigs)
    - Subfamily: Caviinae
      - Genus: Cavia
        - Montane guinea pig, Cavia tschudii LC
      - Genus: Galea
        - Common yellow-toothed cavy, Galea musteloides LC
      - Genus: Microcavia
        - Southern mountain cavy, Microcavia australis LC
        - Andean mountain cavy, Microcavia niata LC
  - Family: Ctenomyidae
    - Genus: Ctenomys
      - Coyhaique tuco-tuco, Ctenomys coyhaiquensis DD
      - Tawny tuco-tuco, Ctenomys fulvus LC
      - Magellanic tuco-tuco, Ctenomys magellanicus VU
      - Maule tuco-tuco, Ctenomys maulinus LC
      - Highland tuco-tuco, Ctenomys opimus LC
  - Family: Octodontidae
    - Genus: Aconaemys
      - Chilean rock rat, Aconaemys fuscus LC
      - Porter's rock rat, Aconaemys porteri DD
      - Sage's rock rat, Aconaemys sagei DD
    - Genus: Octodon
      - Bridges's degu, Octodon bridgesi VU
      - Common degu, Octodon degus LC
      - Moon-toothed degu, Octodon lunatus NT
      - Pacific degu, Octodon pacificus CR
    - Genus: Octodontomys
      - Mountain degu, Octodontomys gliroides LC
    - Genus: Spalacopus
      - Coruro, Spalacopus cyanus LC
  - Family: Abrocomidae
    - Genus: Abrocoma
      - Bennett's chinchilla rat, Abrocoma bennettii LC
      - Ashy chinchilla rat, Abrocoma cinerea LC
  - Family: Myocastoridae (coypus)
    - Genus: Myocastor
      - Coypu, Myocastor coypus LC

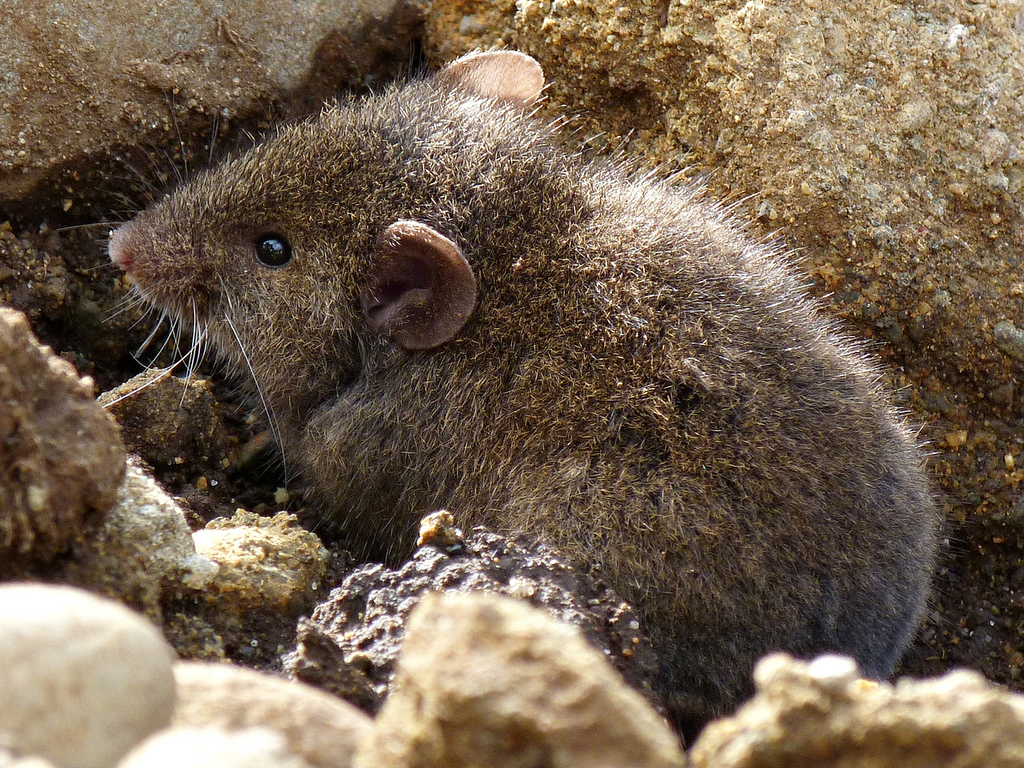
Sanborn's grass mouse

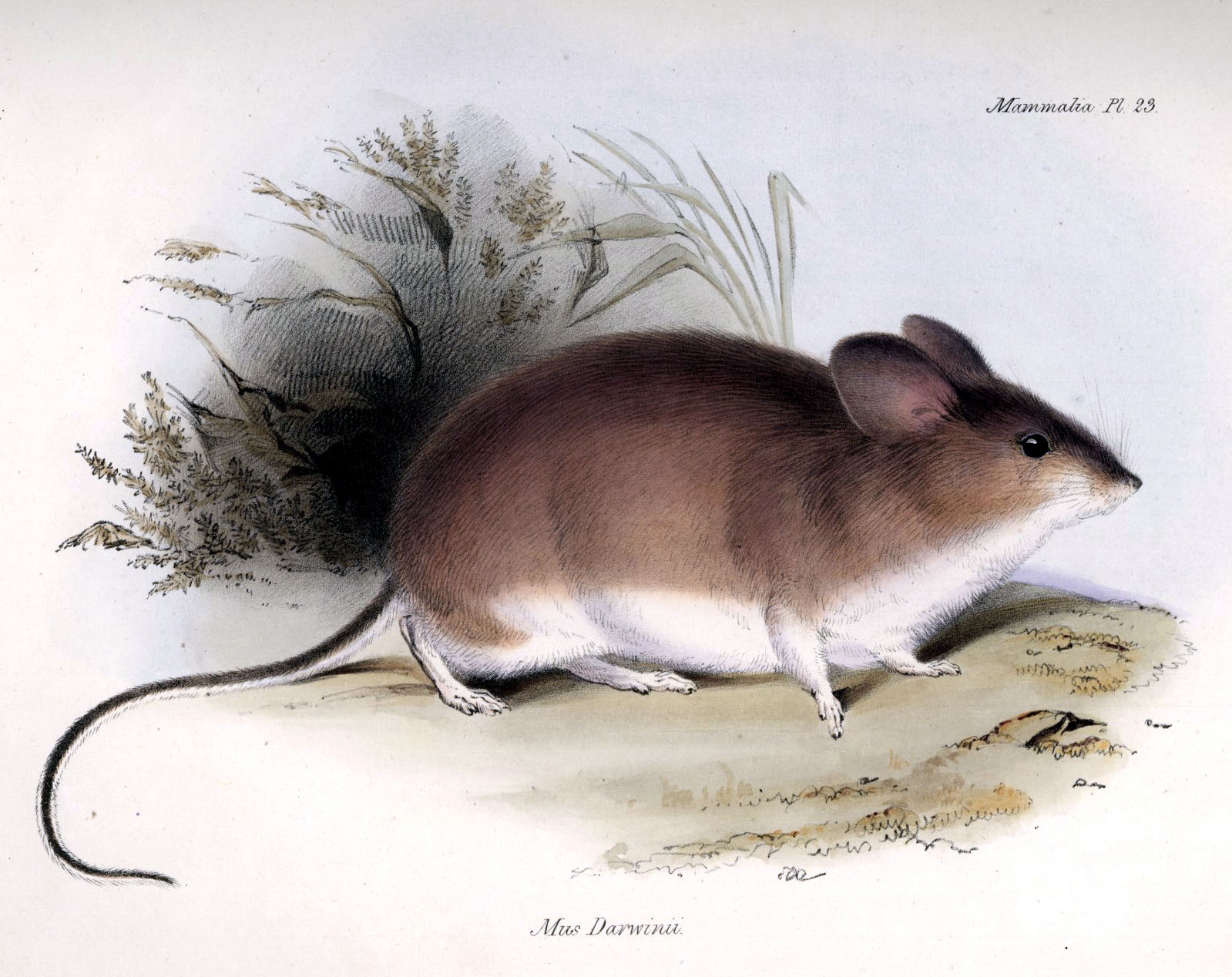
Darwin's leaf-eared mouse

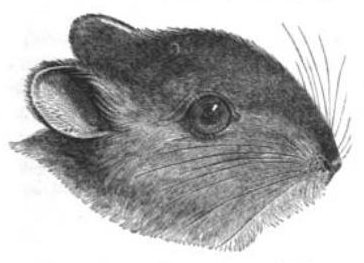
Bunny rat

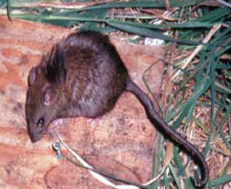
Polynesian rat

- Suborder: Sciurognathi
  - Family: Cricetidae
    - Subfamily: Sigmodontinae
      - Genus: Abrothrix
        - Andean Altiplano mouse, Abrothrix andinus LC
        - Hershkovitz's grass mouse, Abrothrix hershkovitzi LC
        - Woolly grass mouse, Abrothrix lanosus LC
        - Long-haired grass mouse, Abrothrix longipilis LC
        - Olive grass mouse, Abrothrix olivaceus LC
        - Sanborn's grass mouse, Abrothrix sanborni NT
      - Genus: Akodon
        - White-bellied grass mouse, Akodon albiventer LC
        - Bolivian grass mouse, Akodon boliviensis LC
        - Intelligent grass mouse, Akodon iniscatus LC
      - Genus: Andinomys
        - Andean mouse, Andinomys edax LC
      - Genus: Auliscomys
        - Bolivian big-eared mouse, Auliscomys boliviensis LC
        - Painted big-eared mouse, Auliscomys pictus LC
        - Andean big-eared mouse, Auliscomys sublimis LC
      - Genus: Calomys
        - Andean vesper mouse, Calomys lepidus LC
      - Genus: Chelemys
        - Magellanic long-clawed akodont, Chelemys delfini DD
        - Andean long-clawed mouse, Chelemys macronyx LC
        - Large long-clawed mouse, Chelemys megalonyx NT
      - Genus: Chinchillula
        - Altiplano chinchilla mouse, Chinchillula sahamae LC
      - Genus: Eligmodontia
        - Morgan's gerbil mouse, Eligmodontia morgani LC
        - Andean gerbil mouse, Eligmodontia puerulus LC
      - Genus: Euneomys
        - Patagonian chinchilla mouse, Euneomys chinchilloides DD
        - Biting chinchilla mouse, Euneomys mordax LC
        - Peterson's chinchilla mouse, Euneomys petersoni LC
      - Genus: Galenomys
        - Garlepp's mouse, Galenomys garleppi DD
      - Genus: Geoxus
        - Long-clawed mole mouse, Geoxus valdivianus LC
      - Genus: Irenomys
        - Chilean climbing mouse, Irenomys tarsalis LC
      - Genus: Loxodontomys
        - Southern big-eared mouse, Loxodontomys micropus LC
        - Pikumche pericote, Loxodontomys pikumche LC
      - Genus: Neotomys
        - Andean swamp rat, Neotomys ebriosus LC
      - Genus: Oligoryzomys
        - Long-tailed pygmy rice rat, Oligoryzomys longicaudatus LC
        - Magellanic pygmy rice rat, Oligoryzomys magellanicus LC
      - Genus: Pearsonomys
        - Pearson's long-clawed akodont, Pearsonomys annectens VU
      - Genus: Phyllotis
        - Darwin's leaf-eared mouse, Phyllotis darwini LC
        - Lima leaf-eared mouse, Phyllotis limatus LC
        - Master leaf-eared mouse, Phyllotis magister LC
        - Osgood's leaf-eared mouse, Phyllotis osgoodi DD
        - Yellow-rumped leaf-eared mouse, Phyllotis xanthopygus LC
      - Genus: Reithrodon
        - Bunny rat, Reithrodon auritus LC
  - Family: Muridae (mice, rats, voles, gerbils, hamsters, etc.)
    - Subfamily: Murinae
      - Genus: Rattus
        - Polynesian rat, Rattus exulans LC

==== Superorder: Laurasiatheria ====
===== Order: Chiroptera (bats) =====
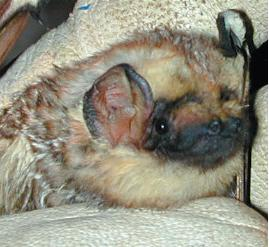
Hoary bat

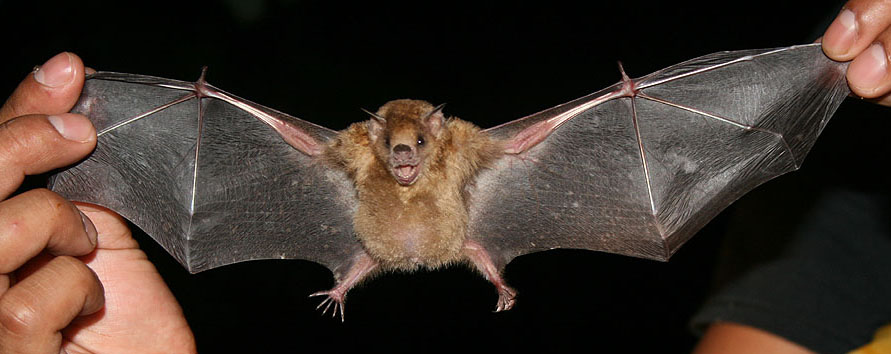
Little yellow-shouldered bat

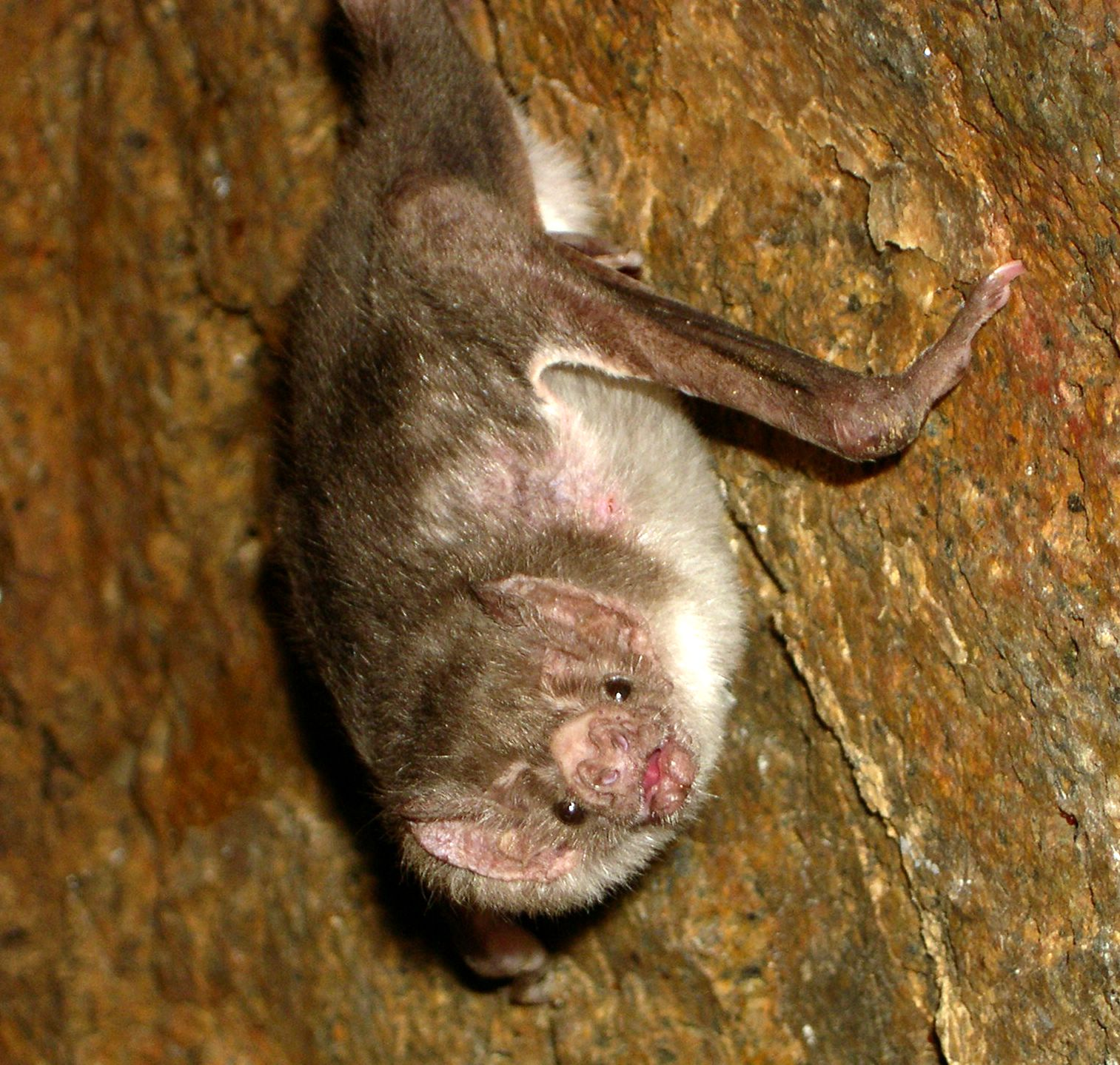
Common vampire bat

The bats' most distinguishing feature is that their forelimbs are developed as wings, making them the only mammals capable of flight. Bat species account for about 20% of all mammals.

- Family: Vespertilionidae
  - Subfamily: Myotinae
    - Genus: Myotis
      - Atacama myotis, Myotis atacamensis NT
      - Chilean myotis, Myotis chiloensis LC
  - Subfamily: Vespertilioninae
    - Genus: Histiotus
      - Big-eared brown bat, Histiotus macrotus LC
      - Southern big-eared brown bat, Histiotus magellanicus] LC
      - Small big-eared brown bat, Histiotus montanus LC
    - Genus: Lasiurus
      - Desert red bat, Lasiurus blossevillii LC
      - Hoary bat, Lasiurus cinereus LC
      - Cinnamon red bat, Lasiurus varius LC
- Family: Molossidae
  - Genus: Eumops
    - Western mastiff bat, Eumops perotis LC
  - Genus: Mormopterus
    - Kalinowski's mastiff bat, Mormopterus kalinowskii LC
  - Genus: Tadarida
    - Mexican free-tailed bat, Tadarida brasiliensis LC
- Family: Phyllostomidae
  - Subfamily: Stenodermatinae
    - Genus: Sturnira
      - Little yellow-shouldered bat, Sturnira lilium LC
  - Subfamily: Desmodontinae
    - Genus: Desmodus
      - Common vampire bat, Desmodus rotundus LC
- Family: Furipteridae
  - Genus: Amorphochilus
    - Smoky bat, Amorphochilus schnablii EN

===== Order: Carnivora (carnivorans) =====
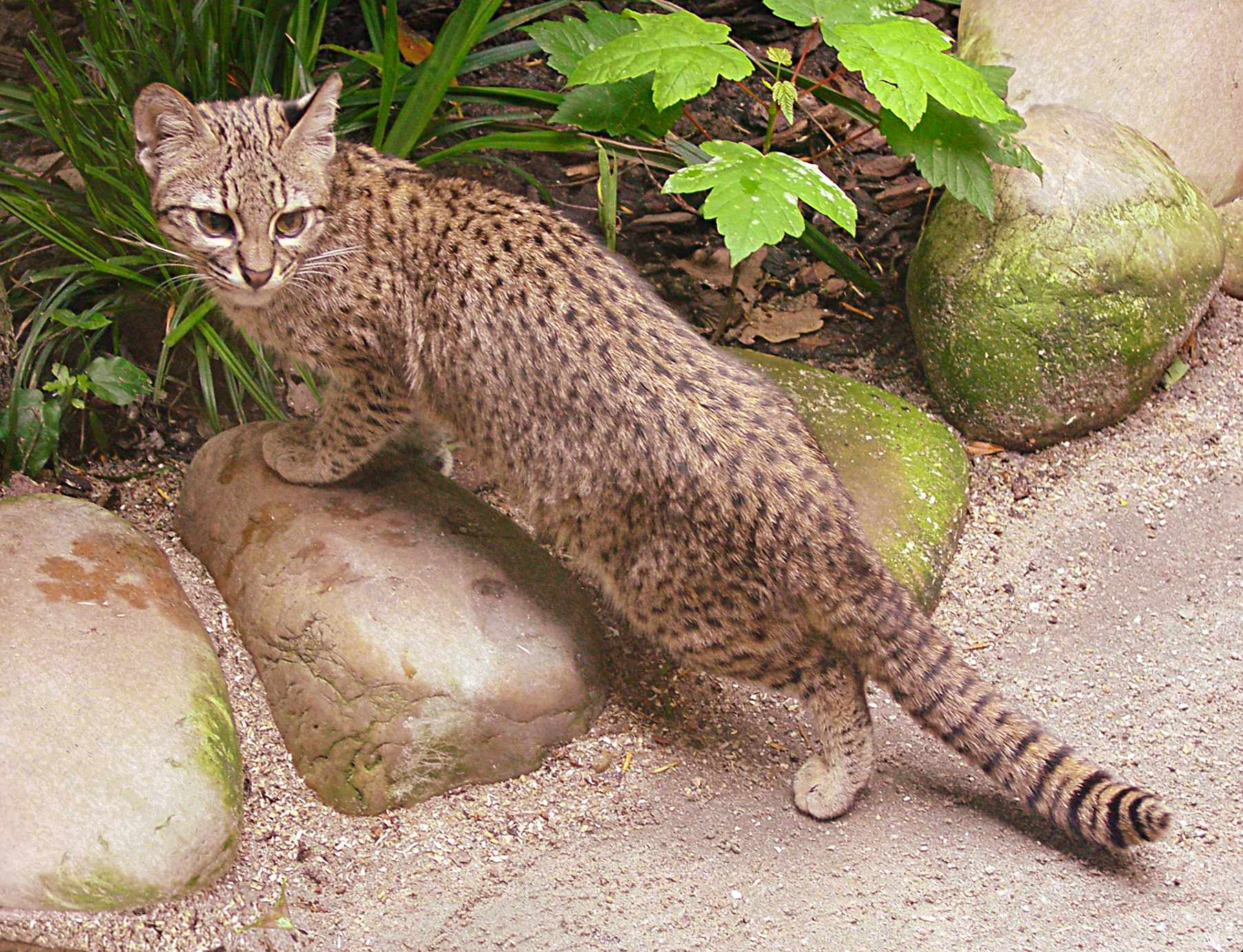
Geoffroy's cat

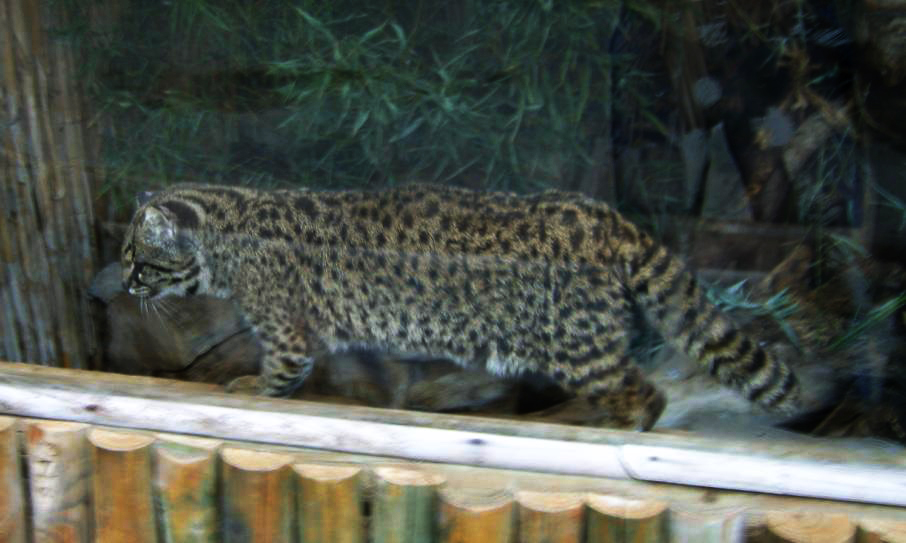
Kodkod

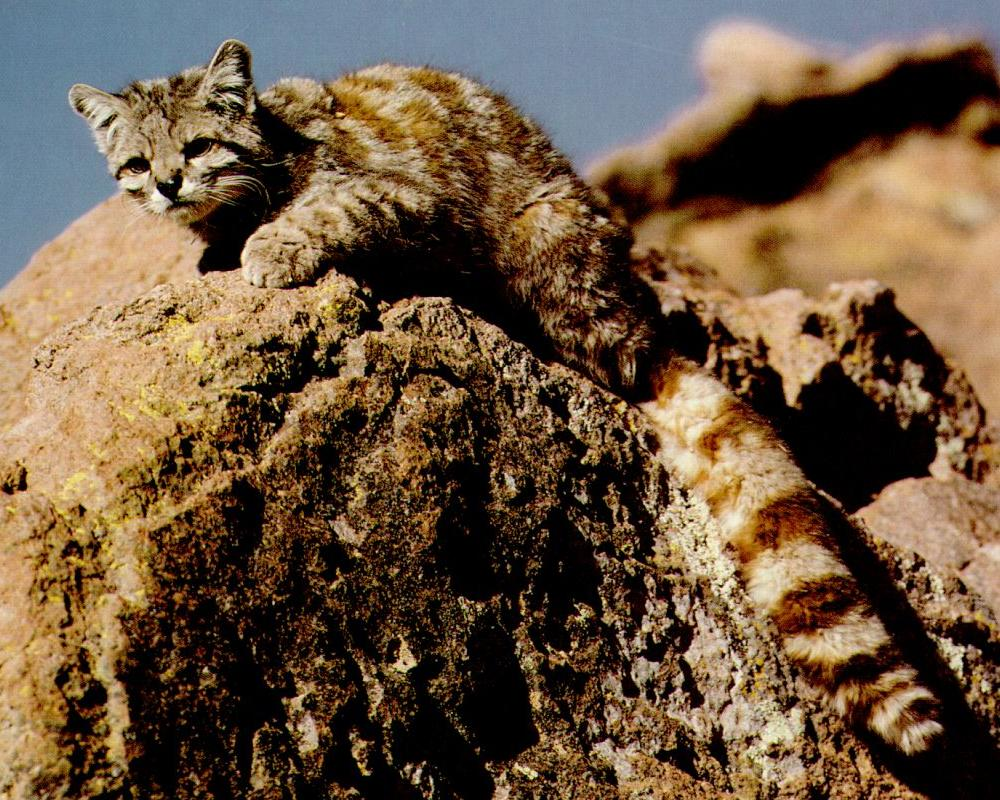
Andean mountain cat

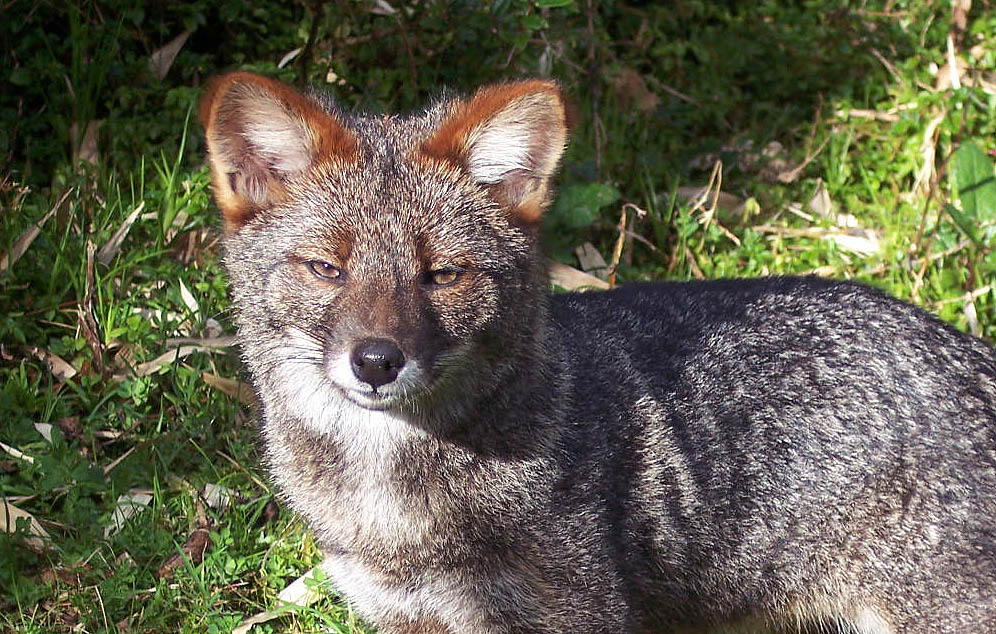
Darwin's fox

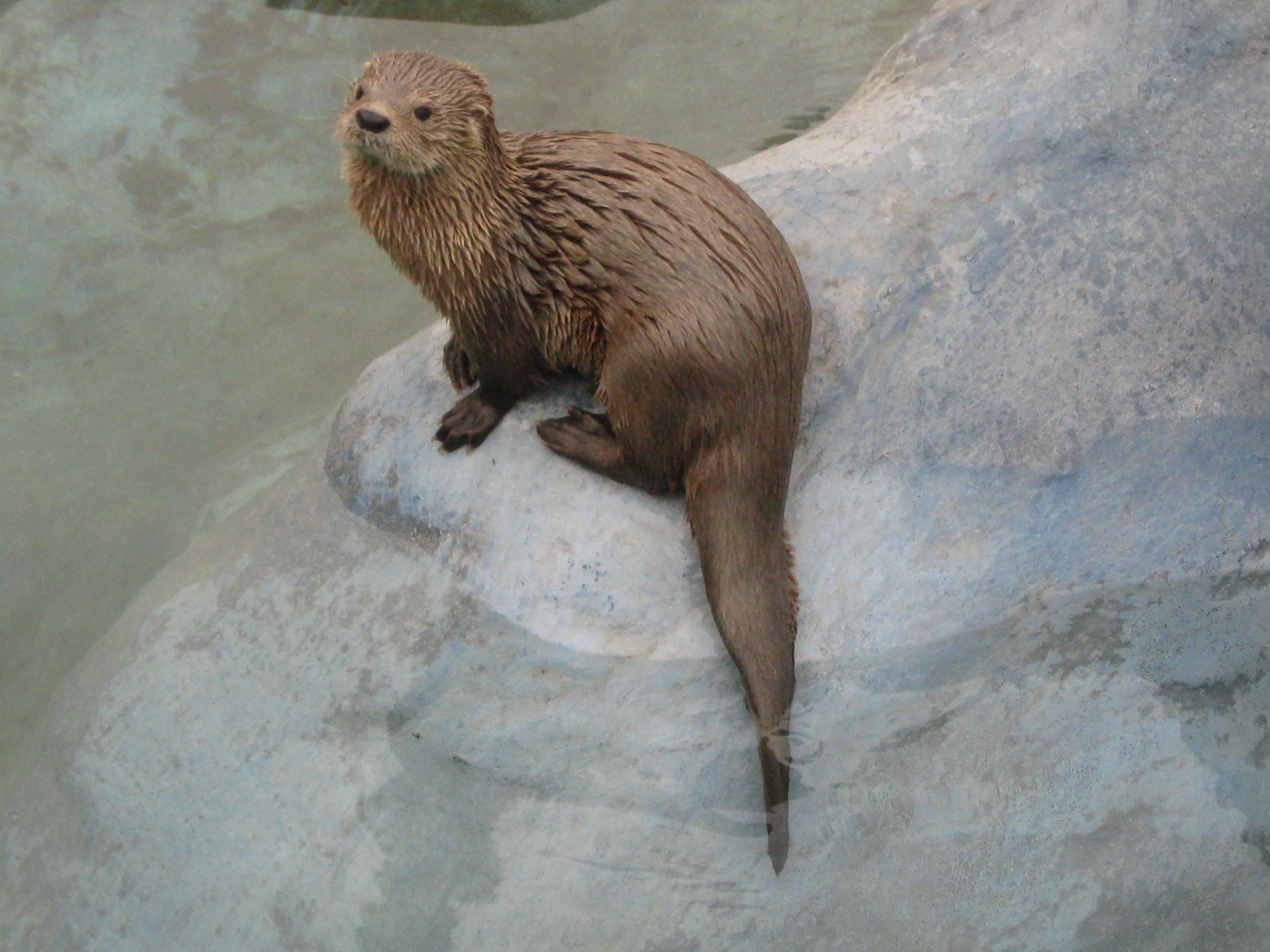
Marine otter

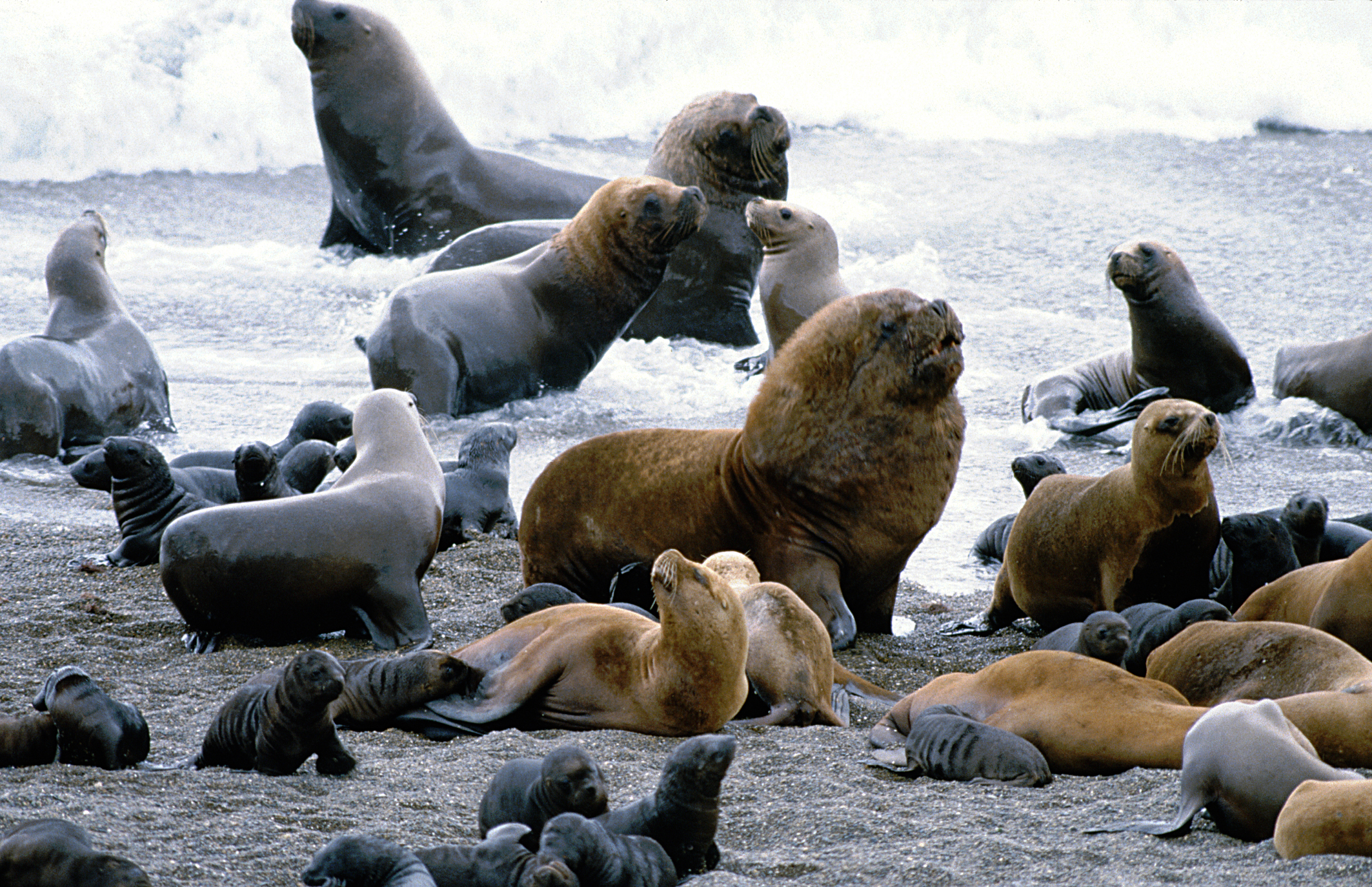
South American sea lion

There are over 260 species of carnivorans, the majority of which feed primarily on meat. They have a characteristic skull shape and dentition.

- Suborder: Feliformia
  - Family: Felidae (cats)
    - Subfamily: Felinae
      - Genus: Leopardus
        - Pampas cat L. colocola NT
        - Geoffroy's cat L. geoffroyi LC
        - Kodkod, L. guigna VU
        - Andean mountain cat L. jacobitus EN
      - Genus: Puma
        - Cougar, P. concolor LC
- Suborder: Caniformia
  - Family: Canidae (dogs, foxes)
    - Genus: Dusicyon
      - Dusicyon avus EX
    - Genus: Lycalopex
      - Culpeo, Lycalopex culpaeus LC
      - Darwin's fox, Lycalopex fulvipes CR
      - South American gray fox, Lycalopex griseus LC
  - Family: Procyonidae (raccoons)
    - Genus: Nasua
      - South American coati, Nasua nasua LC introduced
  - Family: Mustelidae, (mustelids)
    - Genus: Galictis
      - Lesser grison, Galictis cuja LC
    - Genus: Lyncodon
      - Patagonian weasel, Lyncodon patagonicus LC
    - Genus: Lontra
      - Marine otter, Lontra felina EN
      - Southern river otter, Lontra provocax EN
    - Genus: Neogale
      - American mink, N. vison LC introduced
  - Family: Mephitidae
    - Genus: Conepatus
      - Molina's hog-nosed skunk, Conepatus chinga LC
      - Humboldt's hog-nosed skunk, Conepatus humboldtii LC
  - Clade: Pinnipedia (seals, sea lions and walruses)
    - Family: Otariidae (eared seals, sea lions)
      - Genus: Arctocephalus
        - South American fur seal, Arctocephalus australis LC
        - Antarctic fur seal, Arctocephalus gazella EN
        - Juan Fernandez fur seal, Arctocephalus philippii NT
        - Subantarctic fur seal, Arctocephalus tropicalis LC
      - Genus: Otaria
        - South American sea lion, Otaria flavescens LC
    - Family: Phocidae, (earless seals)
      - Genus: Hydrurga
        - Leopard seal, Hydrurga leptonyx LC
      - Genus: Leptonychotes
        - Weddell seal, Leptonychotes weddellii LC
      - Genus: Lobodon
        - Crabeater seal, Lobodon carcinophaga LC
      - Genus: Ommatophoca
        - Ross seal, Ommatophoca rossii LC
      - Genus: Mirounga
        - Southern elephant seal, Mirounga leonina LC

===== Order: Artiodactyla (even-toed ungulates and cetaceans) =====
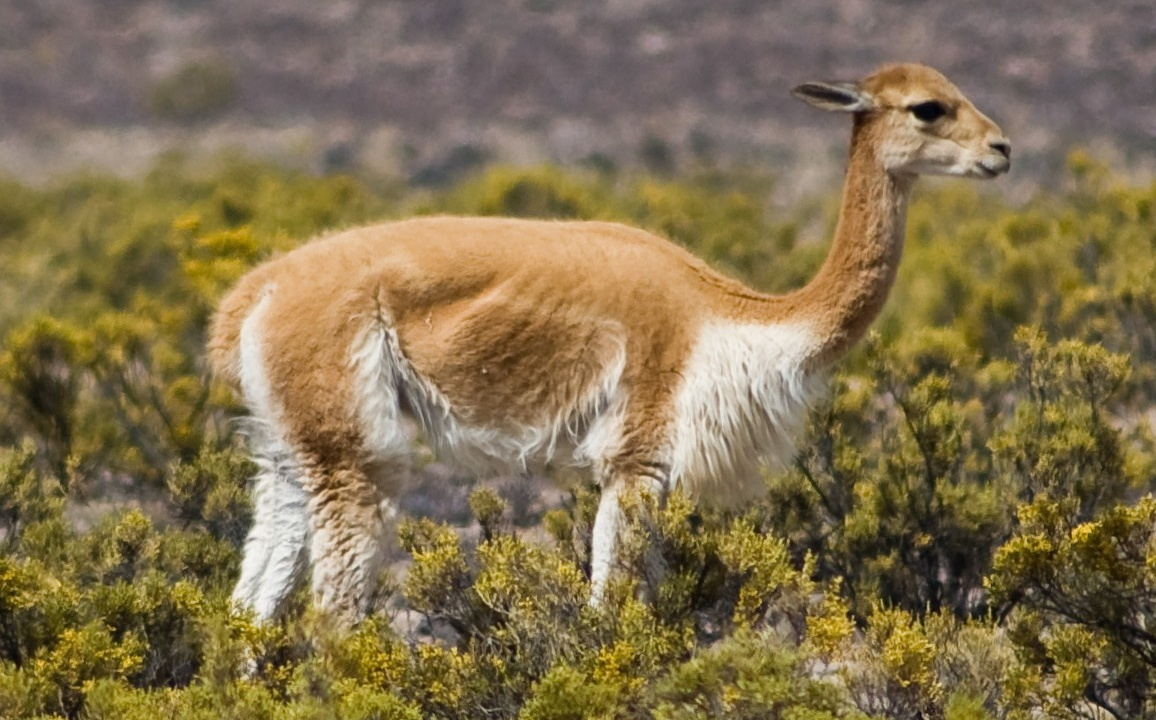
Vicuña

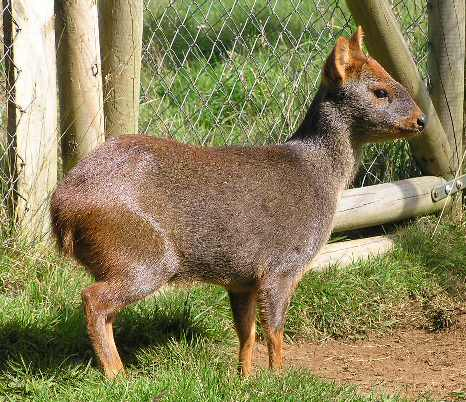
Southern pudú

The weight of even-toed ungulates is borne about equally by the third and fourth toes, rather than mostly or entirely by the third as in perissodactyls. There are about 220 noncetacean artiodactyl species, including many that are of great economic importance to humans.

- Family: Camelidae (camels, llamas)
  - Genus: Lama
    - Guanaco, L. guanicoe LC
    - Vicuña, L. vicugna LC
- Family: Cervidae (deer)
  - Subfamily: Capreolinae
    - Genus: Hippocamelus
      - Taruca, Hippocamelus antisensis VU
      - South Andean deer, Hippocamelus bisulcus EN
    - Genus: Pudu
      - Southern pudú, Pudu puda VU
  - Subfamily: Cervinae
    - Genus: Dama
      - European fallow deer, D. dama LC introduced
    - Genus: Cervus
      - Red deer, C. elaphus LC introduced
- Family: Suidae
  - Genus: Sus
    - Wild boar, S. scrofa LC introduced

====== Infraorder: Cetacea (whales, dolphins and porpoises) ======
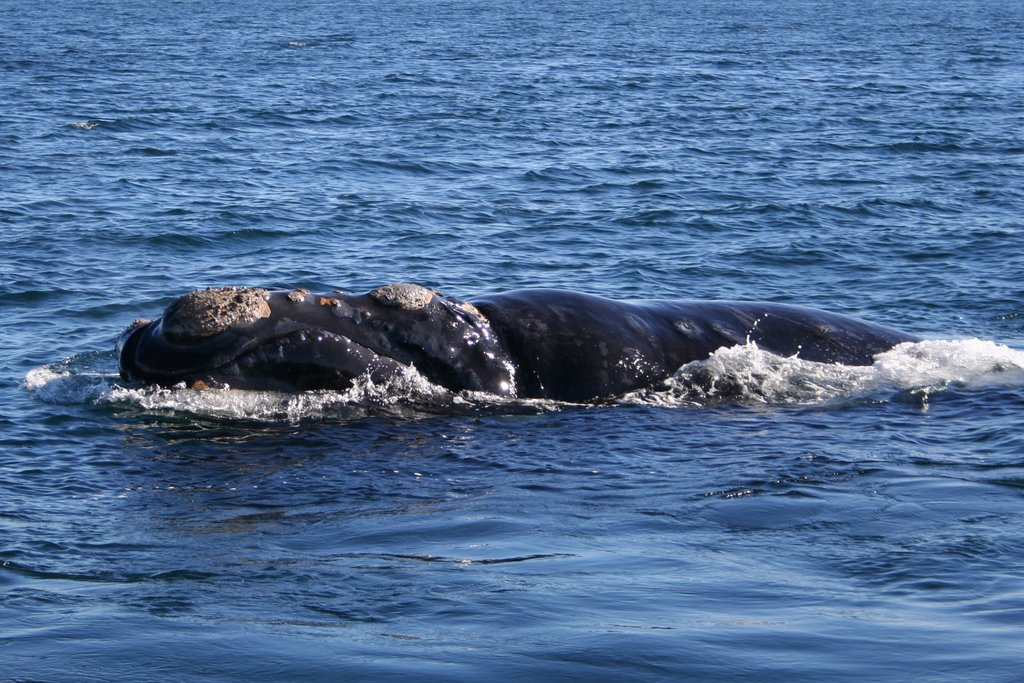
Southern right whale

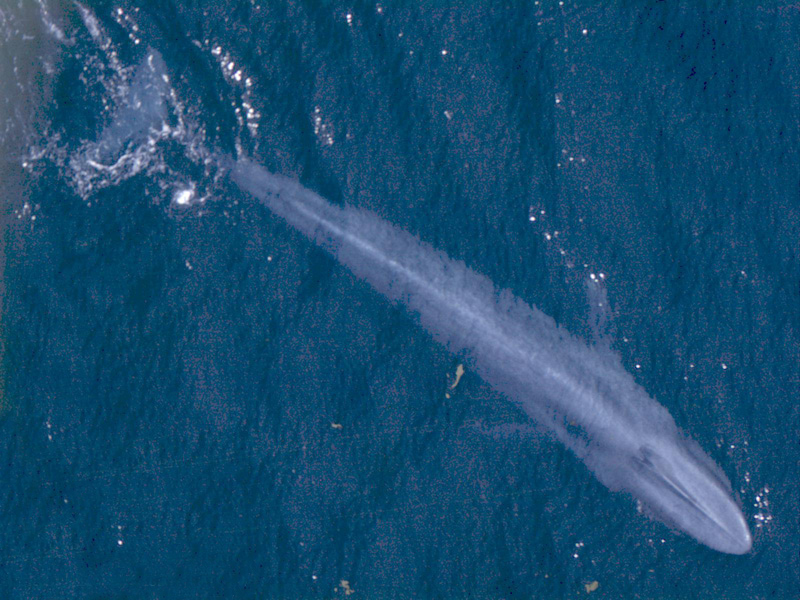
Blue whale

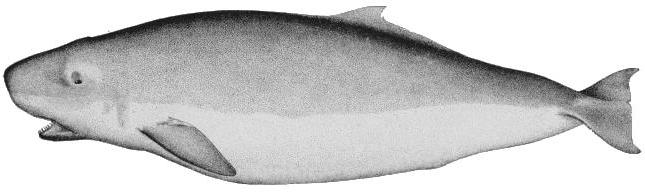
Pygmy sperm whale

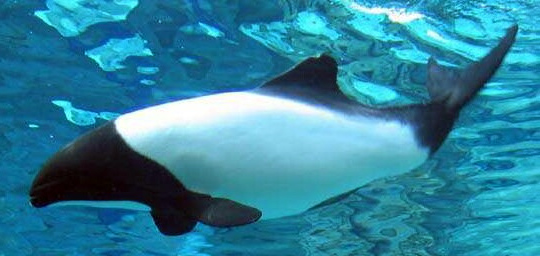
Commerson's dolphin

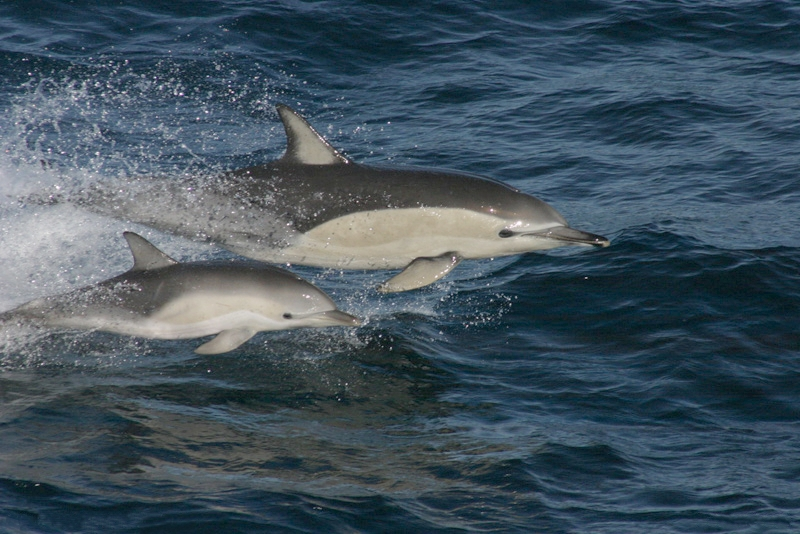
Short-beaked common dolphin

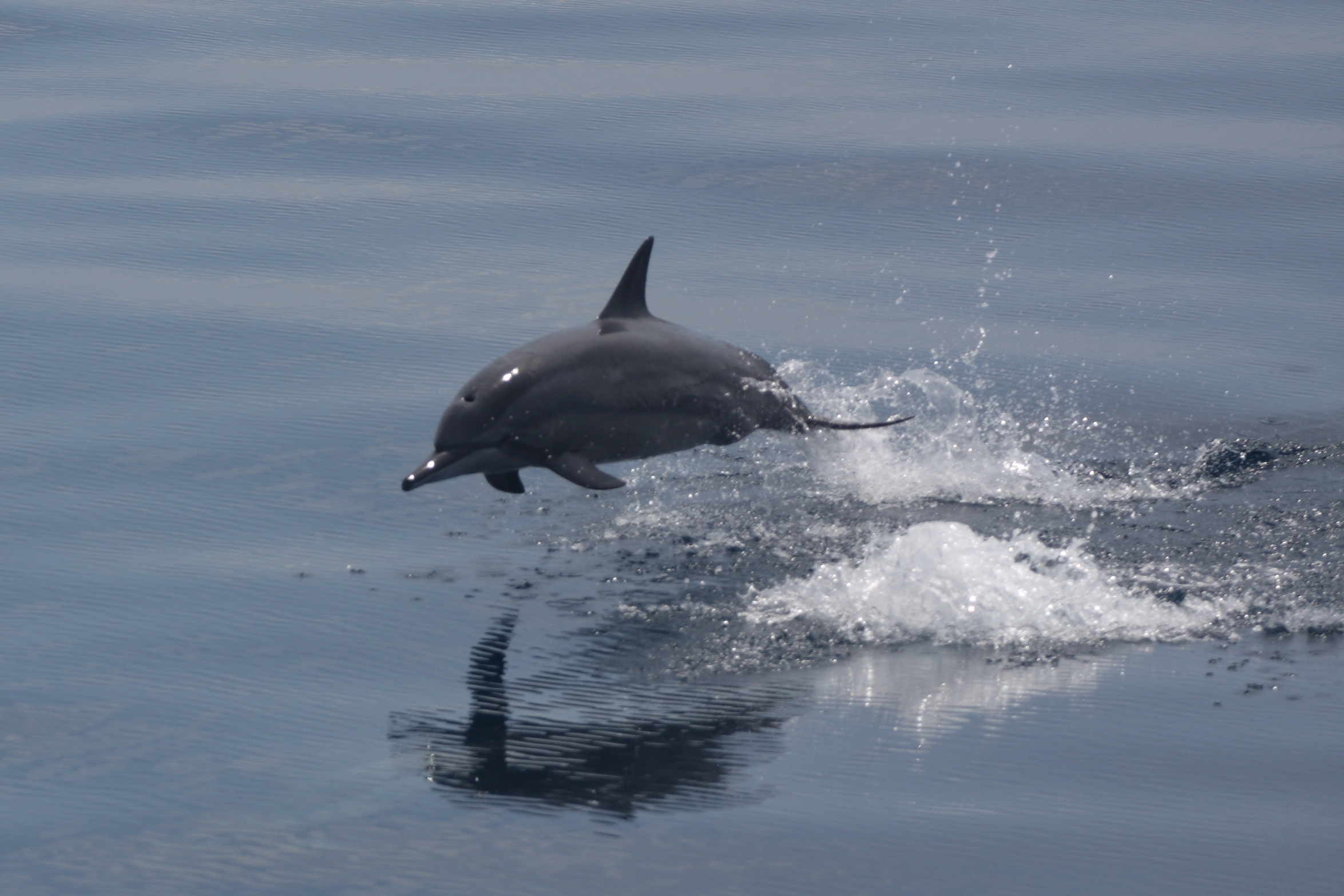
Spinner dolphin

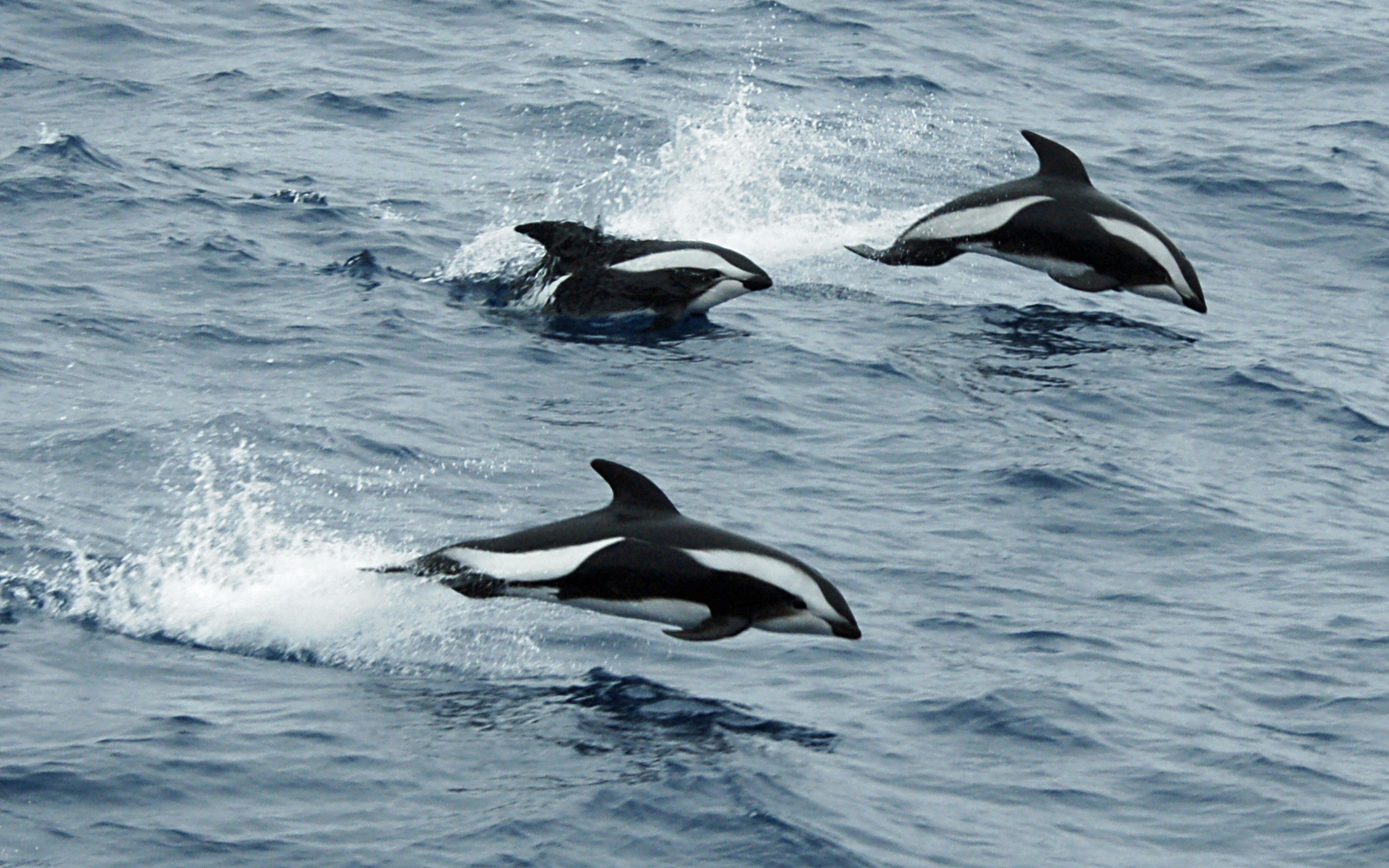
Hourglass dolphin

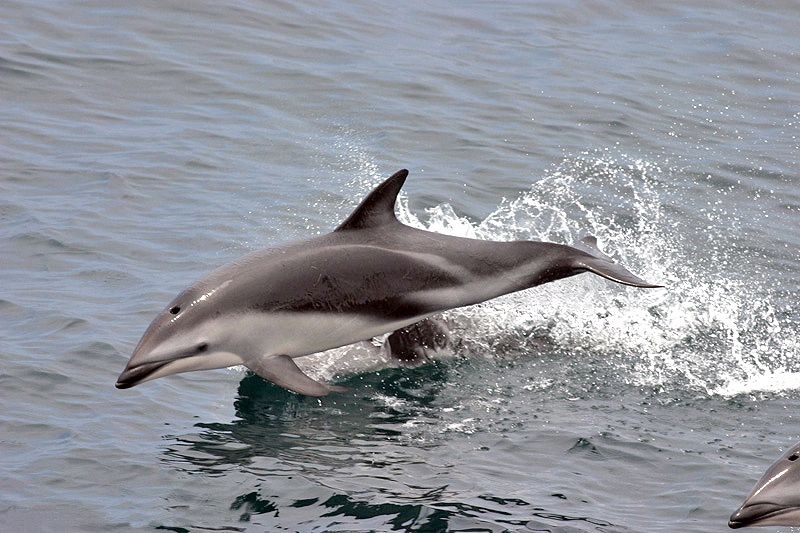
Dusky dolphin

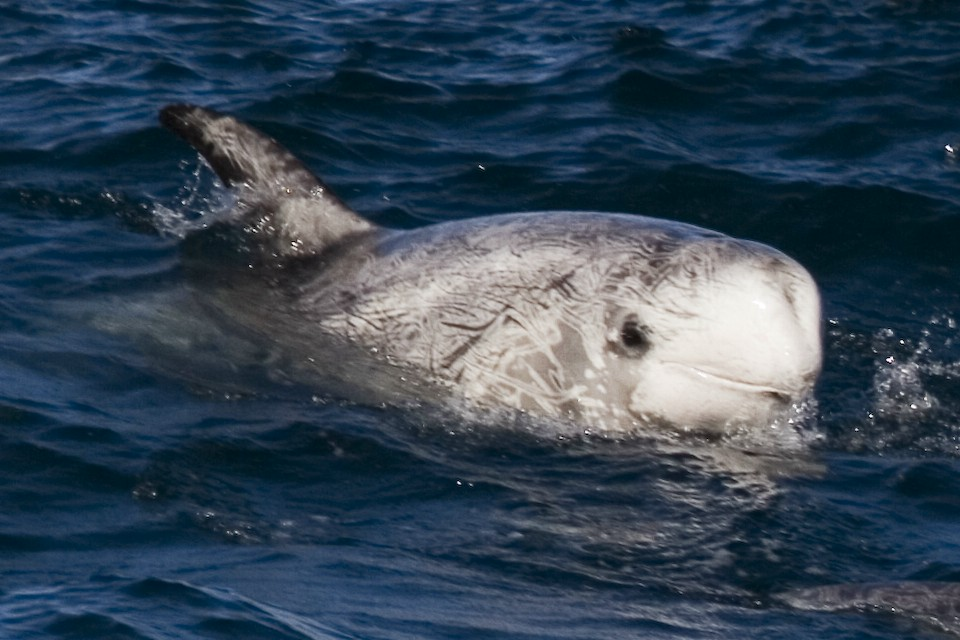
Risso's dolphin

Orca

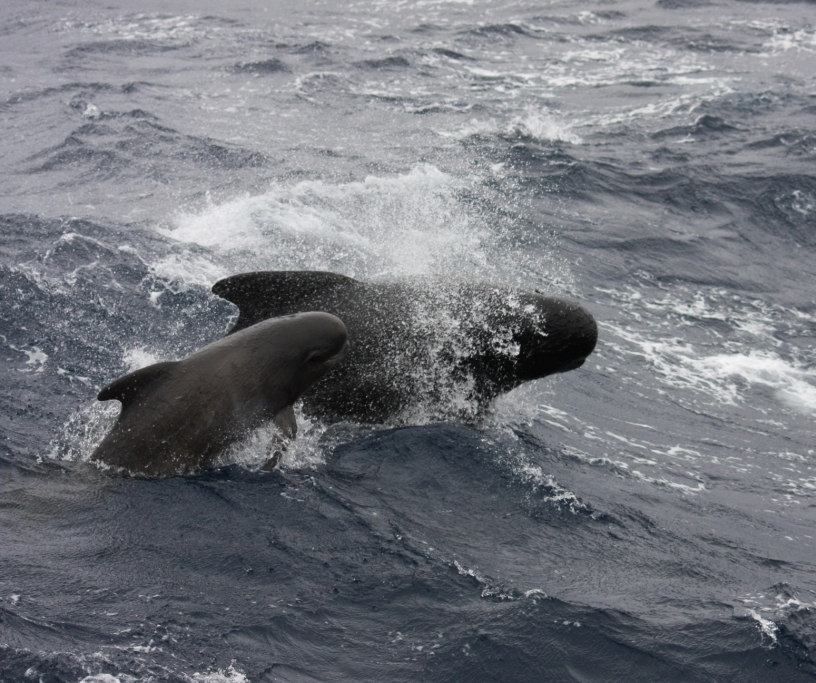
Long-finned pilot whale

The infraorder Cetacea includes whales, dolphins and porpoises. They are the mammals most fully adapted to aquatic life with a spindle-shaped nearly hairless body, protected by a thick layer of blubber, and forelimbs and tail modified to provide propulsion underwater. Their closest extant relatives are the hippos, which are artiodactyls, from which cetaceans descended; cetaceans are thus also artiodactyls.

- Parvorder: Mysticeti
  - Family: Balaenidae
    - Genus: Eubalaena
      - Southern right whale, Eubalaena australis LC
  - Family: Balaenopteridae
    - Subfamily: Balaenopterinae
      - Genus: Balaenoptera
        - Common minke whale, Balaenoptera acutorostrata LC
        - Antarctic minke whale, Balaenoptera bonaerensis NT
        - Sei whale, Balaenoptera borealis EN
        - Bryde's whale, Balaenoptera edeni DD
        - Blue whale, Balaenoptera musculus EN
        - Fin whale, Balaenoptera physalus VU
    - Subfamily: Megapterinae
      - Genus: Megaptera
        - Humpback whale, Megaptera novaeangliae LC
  - Family: Neobalaenidae
    - Genus: Caperea
      - Pygmy right whale, Caperea marginata LC
- Parvorder: Odontoceti
  - Family: Physeteridae
    - Genus: Physeter
      - Sperm whale, Physeter macrocephalus VU
  - Family: Kogiidae
    - Genus: Kogia
      - Pygmy sperm whale, Kogia breviceps DD
      - Dwarf sperm whale, Kogia sima DD
  - Family: Ziphidae
    - Genus: Ziphius
      - Cuvier's beaked whale, Ziphius cavirostris LC
    - Genus: Berardius
      - Arnoux's beaked whale, Berardius arnuxii DD
    - Genus: Tasmacetus
      - Shepherd's beaked whale, Tasmacetus shepherdi DD
    - Subfamily: Hyperoodontinae
      - Genus: Hyperoodon
        - Southern bottlenose whale, Hyperoodon planifrons LC
      - Genus: Mesoplodon
        - Blainville's beaked whale, Mesoplodon densirostris DD
        - Ginkgo-toothed beaked whale, Mesoplodon ginkgodens DD
        - Gray's beaked whale, Mesoplodon grayi DD
        - Hector's beaked whale, Mesoplodon hectori DD
        - Strap-toothed whale, Mesoplodon layardii DD
        - Spade-toothed whale, Mesoplodon traversii DD
  - Superfamily: Delphinoidea
    - Family: Phocoenidae (porpoises) LC
      - Genus: Phocoena
        - Spectacled porpoise, Phocoena dioptrica LC
        - Burmeister's porpoise, Phocoena spinipinnis NT
    - Family: Delphinidae (marine dolphins)
      - Genus: Cephalorhynchus
        - Commerson's dolphin, Cephalorhynchus commersonii LC
        - Chilean dolphin, Cephalorhynchus eutropia NT
      - Genus: Steno
        - Rough-toothed dolphin, Steno bredanensis LC
      - Genus: Tursiops
        - Common bottlenose dolphin, Tursiops truncatus LC
      - Genus: Stenella
        - Spinner dolphin, Stenella longirostris LC
      - Genus: Delphinus
        - Long-beaked common dolphin, Delphinus capensis DD
        - Short-beaked common dolphin, Delphinus delphis LC
      - Genus: Lagenorhynchus
        - Peale's dolphin, Lagenorhynchus australis DD
        - Hourglass dolphin, Lagenorhynchus cruciger LC
        - Dusky dolphin, Lagenorhynchus obscurus DD
      - Genus: Lissodelphis
        - Southern right whale dolphin, Lissodelphis peronii LC
      - Genus: Grampus
        - Risso's dolphin, Grampus griseus LC
      - Genus: Orcinus
        - Orca, Orcinus orca DD
      - Genus: Pseudorca
        - False killer whale, Pseudorca crassidens NT
      - Genus: Globicephala
        - Long-finned pilot whale, Globicephala melas LC

== See also ==
- Wildlife in Chile
- List of mammals in Antarctica
- Lists of mammals by region
- List of prehistoric mammals
- Mammal classification
- List of mammals described in the 2000s
