= Irenomys =

Conservation status
- Least Concern (IUCN 3.1)

Scientific classification
- Kingdom: Animalia
- Phylum: Chordata
- Class: Mammalia
- Order: Rodentia
- Family: Cricetidae
- Subfamily: Sigmodontinae
- Tribe: Phyllotini
- Genus: Irenomys; Thomas, 1919
- Species: I. tarsalis

Binomial name
- Irenomys tarsalis (Philippi, 1900)

Synonyms
- Mus tarsalis Philippi, 1900; Reithrodon longicaudatus Philippi, 1900; Irenomys longicaudatus: Thomas, 1919; Irenomys tarsalis: Osgood, 1943

Species of rodent

Irenomys tarsalis, also known as the Chilean climbing mouse, Chilean tree mouse, or long-footed irenomys, is a rodent found in Chile, from about 36° to 46°S, and in adjacent Argentina, mainly in forests. It is a large, long-tailed, soft-furred mouse characterized by grooved upper incisors and specialized molars with transverse ridges, divided by deep valleys, which are connected by a transverse ridge along the midline of the molars.

Irenomys tarsalis is a docile, herbivorous animal that lives in trees. It is so distinct from other species that it was placed in its own genus, Irenomys, in 1919. The name comes from the Ancient Greek word εἰρήνη (iren) meaning "peace", in reference to the end of World War I. Although it has been generally placed in the tribe Phyllotini, genetic evidence does not support any close relationships with other genera, so that it is now classified as a member of the subfamily Sigmodontinae incertae sedis (of uncertain position).

== Taxonomy ==
In 1900, Rodolfo Armando Philippi named both Mus tarsalis (from Valdivia Province in mainland Chile) and Reithrodon longicaudatus (from a small island near Chiloé), both of which are now classified as Irenomys tarsalis. Philippi's Reithrodon longicaudatus was transferred into a new genus, Irenomys, by Oldfield Thomas in February 1919. The name, which means "peace mouse" in Greek, referred to the end of World War I four months before. Another of the species Philippi described in 1900, Mus mochae, was later transferred to Irenomys because of a mismatch between the skin and skull, but it is in fact a member of the genus Abrothrix and not closely related to Irenomys. In his 1943 work on The mammals of Chile, Wilfred Hudson Osgood recognized the close relation between Philippi's Mus tarsalis and Reithrodon longicaudatus and referred them to a single species, then called Irenomys tarsalis. Osgood retained two subspecies, Irenomys tarsalis tarsalis on the mainland and Irenomys tarsalis longicaudatus on Chiloé and nearby islands, on the basis of slight differences in pelage coloration. In the few mature specimens of the latter subspecies that Osgood had, the underparts are somewhat lighter than in examples of I. t. tarsalis, which has a pinkish color in the underparts, but Osgood stressed that further material could well indicate that the two forms could not be distinguished.

In his description of the genus, Thomas opined that Irenomys is most closely related to Phyllotis. The group of genera related to Phyllotis was later formalized as the tribe Phyllotini, and Irenomys was often included there, but also excluded from it by some authors. In 1995, a cladistic analysis of Phyllotini on the basis of morphology provided evidence in favor of placement of Irenomys in the group, with some support for a close relation to Andinomys. From 1999 on, DNA sequence data cast doubt on this assignment, as studies using the mitochondrial cytochrome b gene and the nuclear IRBP gene placed Irenomys in a variety of positions, all outside Phyllotini, with Scolomys, Sigmodon, Euneomys, and various large clades of sigmodontines all as sister groups in some analyses. Accordingly, it is now classified outside Phyllotini and considered as Sigmodontinae incertae sedis.

== Description ==
Irenomys is a large mouse with a long, hairy tail, large eyes, and long and soft fur. The upperparts are rufous with fine dark lines and the underparts are buff, with the exact color varying by subspecies. The densely haired ears are medium-sized and blackish in color. The feet, which are large and broad, are nearly white. The tail, which ends in a slight pencil, is dark brown, with a somewhat lighter area present on the ventral side in some individuals. The total length is 270 to 326 millimetres (10.63 to 12.83 in), averaging 280 millimetres (11.02 in), the tail length is 162 to 196 millimetres (6.38 to 7.72 in), averaging 165 millimetres (6.50 in), the hindfoot length is 28 to 32 millimetres (1.10 to 1.26 in), averaging 30 millimetres (1.18 in), the ear length is 20 to 25 millimetres (0.79 to 0.98 in), averaging 22 millimetres (0.87 in), and weight is 40 to 59 grams (1.4 to 2.1 oz), averaging 42 grams (1.5 oz). The karyotype includes 64 chromosomes, with a fundamental number (FN) of 98.

The skull resembles that of some Rhipidomys species. The interorbital region is narrow and the incisive foramina are long, extending between the first molars. The upper incisors are deeply grooved. The molars are strongly hypsodont (high-crowned) and consist of transverse, diamond-shaped laminae (plates), separated by deep valleys, which are joined at the midline by narrow ridges, similar to those of the African elephant.

== Distribution and ecology ==
Irenomys tarsalis is restricted to forested habitats in Chile and western Argentina. In the northern part of its range, its distribution falls into two segments, one in coastal Chile and one further east in Chile and in adjacent Argentina, both of which extend north to about 36°S. Further south, it also occurs in Chile and adjacent Argentina, and also on numerous Chilean islands, including Chiloé. The southernmost records are at about 46°S. No fossils are known. It generally occurs in humid and densely forested habitats, often with bamboo vegetations, but a specimen has been reported from riparian vegetation at a small stream near the southern limit of its distribution and it is also found in unforested steppe habitat with scattered Austrocedrus chilensis trees. It does not occur on high elevations. It was a common species during a population peak of small rodents evidently caused by the flowering of quila (Chusquea quila) bamboo.

It is found in association with other rodents such as Abrothrix olivaceus, Abrothrix longipilis, Oligoryzomys longicaudatus, Geoxus valdivianus, and Auliscomys pictus, as well as the marsupials Rhyncholestes raphanurus and Dromiciops gliroides. Remains of Irenomys have been found in owl pellets of the great horned owl (Bubo virginianus), rufous-legged owl (Strix rufipes), and barn owl (Tyto alba); other potential predators include another owl, the Austral pygmy-owl (Glaucidium nanum), and the South American gray fox (Pseudalopex griseus), Darwin's fox (Pseudalopex fulvipes) and Kodkod (Leopardus guigna).

== Natural history and behavior ==
Irenomys lives mainly in trees, but has also been caught on the ground. It climbs by moving both forefeet and both hindfeet alternately. It is docile, but will not readily enter a trap. The breeding season is in the Southern Hemisphere spring, extending into late summer. Litter size is three to six. The animal mostly eats seeds and fruits, but its diet also includes various other plant and fungal materials.

== Conservation status ==
Irenomys is not currently threatened and it is classified as "least concern" by the International Union for Conservation of Nature. It occurs in several protected areas, but destruction of its forest habitat may pose a threat to some populations.
