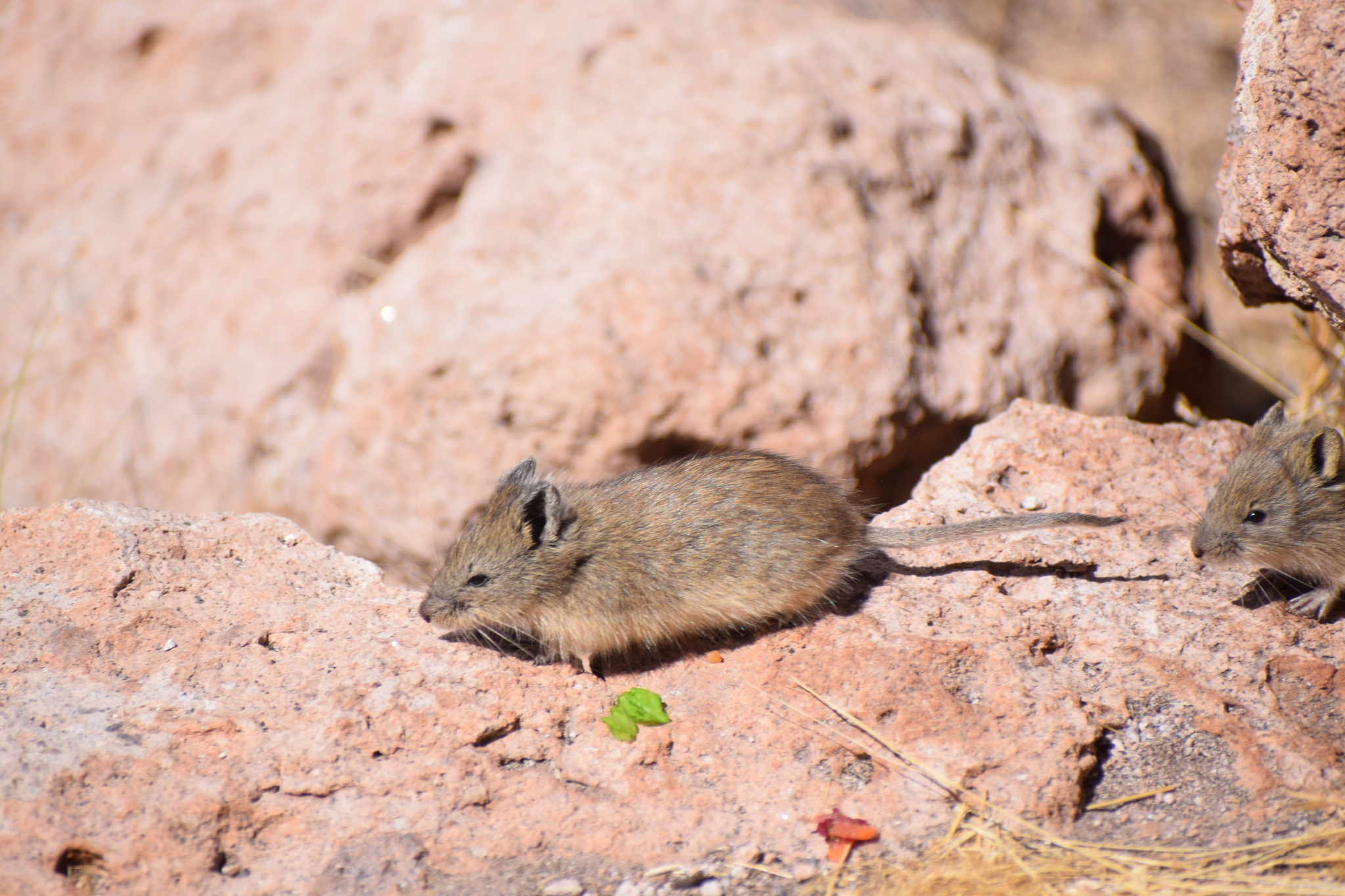

Conservation status
- Least Concern (IUCN 3.1)

Scientific classification
- Kingdom: Animalia
- Phylum: Chordata
- Class: Mammalia
- Order: Rodentia
- Family: Cricetidae
- Subfamily: Sigmodontinae
- Genus: Abrothrix
- Species: A. andina

Binomial name
- Abrothrix andina (Philippi, 1858)

Synonyms
- Mus andinus Philippi, 1858; Akodon andinus; Chroeomys andinus; Abrothrix andinus

= Abrothrix andina =

Species of rodent

Abrothrix andina, also known as the Andean Altiplano mouse, Andean Soft-haired Mouse, Andean Grass Mouse or Andean akodont, is a species of rodent in the genus Abrothrix of family Cricetidae. It is found in the Altiplano habitat of the Andes from central Peru through Bolivia, south to Argentina and Chile.

== Taxonomy ==
Abrothrix andina is a member of the order Rodentia and family Cricetidae with the genus Abrothrix.

== Habitat ==
Abrothrix andina is a small mammal that is active throughout the Andes, and has been found in altitudes of 4,620 m (15,160 ft). The environment consists of small shrubs and is categorizes as having dry summers and snowy winters.

== Biology ==
=== Diet ===
Abrothrix andina primarily eats small shrubs during the summer and shrubs and insects during the winters During extreme temperature changes, the gut morphology changes and energy expenditure changes. For example, their metabolic rate may increase by 36.6% during the winter. Their body mass has shown to fluctuate throughout the seasons, as well. Their diet has shown behaviors that exhibit hyperphagy.

=== Behavior ===
Abrothrix andina is active throughout the year despite seasonal changes.

== Literature cited ==
- Musser, G. G.; Carleton, M. D. (2005). "Superfamily Muroidea". In Wilson, D. E.; Reeder, D. M. (eds.). Mammal Species of the World: A Taxonomic and Geographic Reference (3rd ed.). Johns Hopkins University Press. pp. 894–1531. ISBN 978-0-8018-8221-0. OCLC 62265494.
