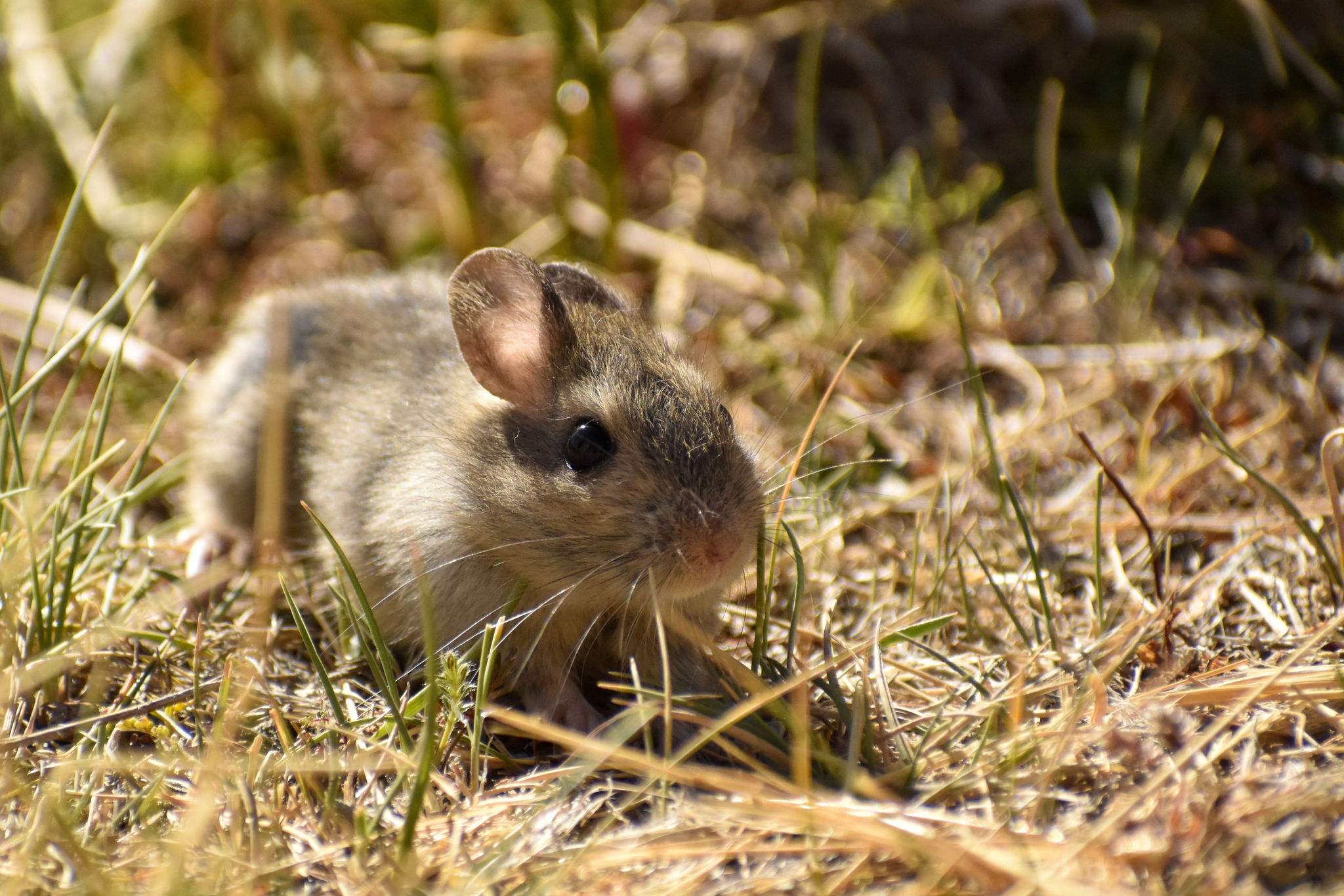

Conservation status
- Least Concern (IUCN 3.1)

Scientific classification
- Kingdom: Animalia
- Phylum: Chordata
- Class: Mammalia
- Order: Rodentia
- Family: Cricetidae
- Subfamily: Sigmodontinae
- Genus: Reithrodon
- Species: R. auritus

Binomial name
- Reithrodon auritus (G. Fischer, 1814)

= Bunny rat =

Species of rodent

The bunny rat, or hairy-soled conyrat (Reithrodon auritus) is a species of rodent in the family Cricetidae, native to southern South America.

== Description ==
The bunny rat is a heavily built rat-like rodent, with a total length of 20 to 27 cm (7.9 to 10.6 in), including the 7 to 10 cm (2.8 to 3.9 in) tail. Adults weigh an average of about 80 g (2.8 oz). The body is covered in long soft hair, and the tail is also hairy, ending in a distinct tuft. The head is relatively large, with prominent rounded, hairy, ears. The hind legs are unusually long for a rat, with the first and fifth toes reduced in size, giving them an appearance similar to those of a rabbit. The fur is dark brown to buff-grey over the upper parts of the body, becoming paler, sometimes almost white, on the underparts. Without genetic analysis, the bunny rat can only be reliably distinguished from its close relative, the naked-soled conyrat, by the fact that the soles of its feet are hairy.

Its karyotype has 2n =34.

== Distribution and habitat ==
Bunny rats are widespread in Argentina and eastern Chile south of about 36°S, and are found in a few patchy localities in northern Argentina and possibly parts of Uruguay. Bunny rats have also been reported from the Falkland Islands. Within this region, they are most commonly found in open grasslands such as steppe and prairie, but can also be found in shrublands, and even beech forest, below about 3,000 m (9,800 ft). Four subspecies are currently recognised, although it is possible that the bunny rat represents a species complex, rather than a single species:

- Reithrodon auritus auritus - central Argentina
- Reithrodon auritus caurinus - northern Argentina
- Reithrodon auritus cuniculoides - southern Argentina, eastern Chile
- Reithrodon auritus pachycephalus - Tierra del Fuego

== Biology and behaviour ==
Bunny rats feed almost entirely on grass, and can consume a mass of vegetation equal to their own body weight in a single night. Although primarily nocturnal, they may also be active during the day, depending on the weather, and spend most of their waking hours feeding. They sleep in tunnels, which are about 4 to 7 cm (1.6 to 2.8 in) wide, and have multiple entrances. In many cases, they may co-opt tunnels dug by other rodent species, and may even share them with the original inhabitant.

Bunny rats can reach population densities of 10–15 per hectare (4.0–6.1/acre) in ideal conditions. They are common prey for owls, and are thought to have a maximum lifespan of 15 months. They breed between September and March, but most commonly in the spring, and give birth to litters of up to eight pups. Females reach sexual maturity two months after birth, although this may be longer for males.
