= Chelemys delfini =

Conservation status
- Data Deficient (IUCN 3.1)

Scientific classification
- Kingdom: Animalia
- Phylum: Chordata
- Class: Mammalia
- Order: Rodentia
- Family: Cricetidae
- Subfamily: Sigmodontinae
- Genus: Chelemys
- Species: C. delfini

Binomial name
- Chelemys delfini (Cabrera, 1905)

Synonyms
- Oxymycterus delfini Cabrera, 1905

Species of rodent

Chelemys delfini, also known as the Magellanic long-clawed akodont, is a species of rodent in the genus Chelemys of family Cricetidae. It is endemic to the areas of Punta Arenas and Torres del Paine National Park in southern Chile, where it lives in the grassland and scrub of the Magellanic steppe. It has sometimes been considered a subspecies of C. megalonyx.

== Literature cited ==
- D'Elia, G. and Pardinas, U. 2008. Chelemys delfini. In IUCN. IUCN Red List of Threatened Species. Version 2009.2. <www.iucnredlist.org>. Downloaded on January 12, 2010.
- Musser, G. G.; Carleton, M. D. (2005). "Superfamily Muroidea". In Wilson, D. E.; Reeder, D. M. (eds.). Mammal Species of the World: A Taxonomic and Geographic Reference (3rd ed.). Johns Hopkins University Press. p. 1109. ISBN 978-0-8018-8221-0. OCLC 62265494.
