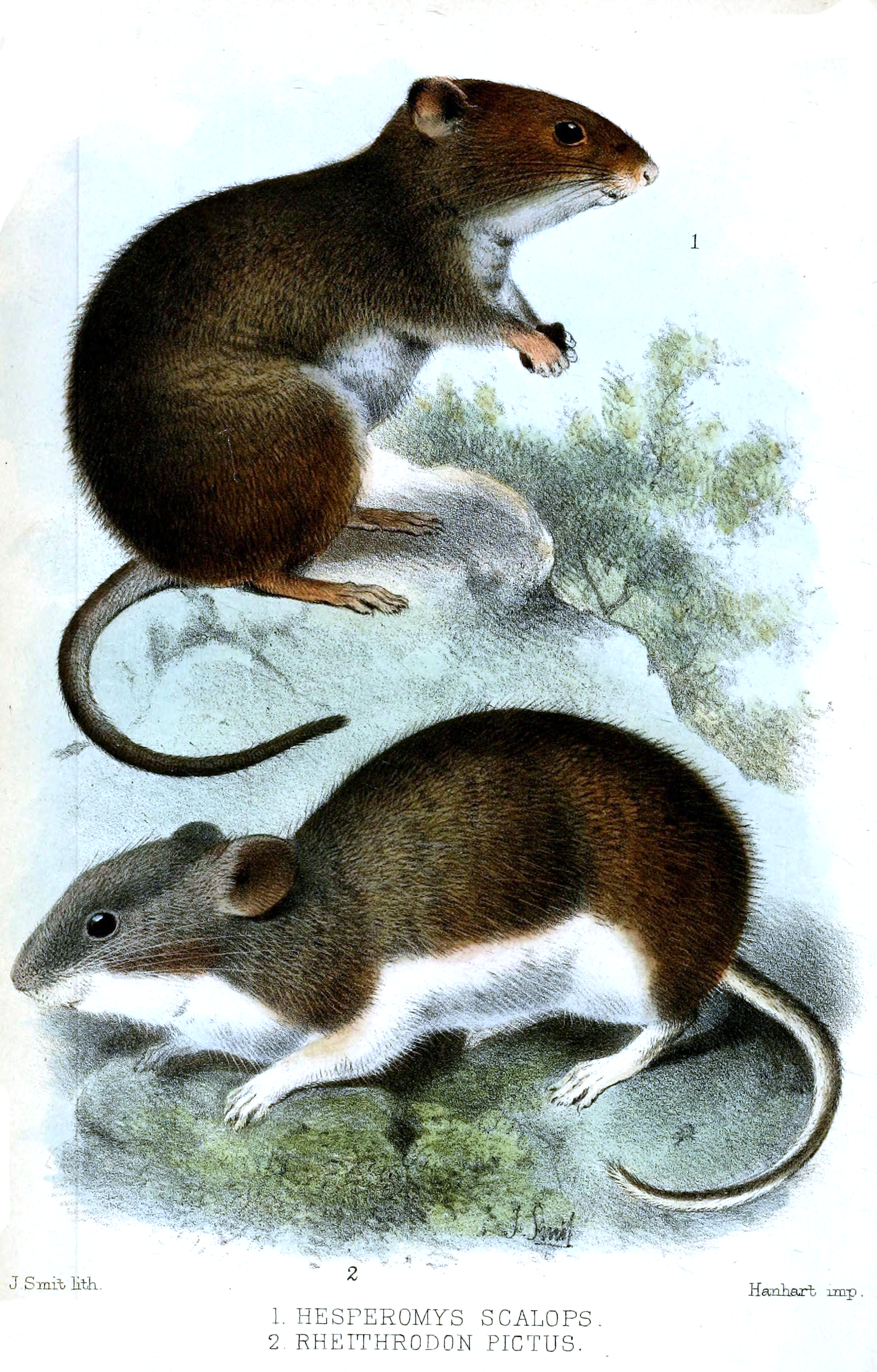
- Auliscomys pictus, below

Scientific classification
- Kingdom: Animalia
- Phylum: Chordata
- Class: Mammalia
- Order: Rodentia
- Family: Cricetidae
- Subfamily: Sigmodontinae
- Tribe: Phyllotini
- Genus: Auliscomys; Osgood, 1915

Type species
- Reithrodon pictus

Species
- Auliscomys boliviensis Auliscomys pictus Auliscomys sublimis

= Auliscomys =

Auliscomys Temporal range: Pliocene or Pleistocene to Recent

Genus of rodents

Auliscomys is a genus of rodent in the family Cricetidae. It contains the following species:

- Bolivian big-eared mouse (Auliscomys boliviensis)
- Painted big-eared mouse (Auliscomys pictus)
- Andean big-eared mouse (Auliscomys sublimis)
