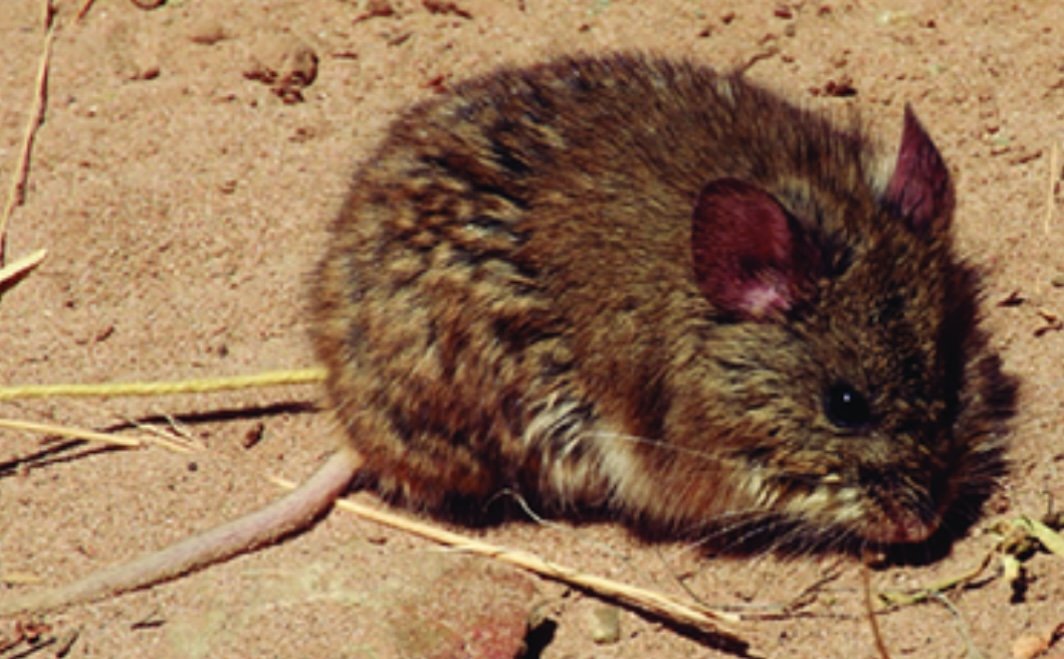

Conservation status
- Least Concern (IUCN 3.1)

Scientific classification
- Kingdom: Animalia
- Phylum: Chordata
- Class: Mammalia
- Order: Rodentia
- Family: Cricetidae
- Subfamily: Sigmodontinae
- Genus: Auliscomys
- Species: A. sublimis

Binomial name
- Auliscomys sublimis (Thomas, 1900)

= Andean big-eared mouse =

Species of rodent

The Andean big-eared mouse (Auliscomys sublimis) is a species of rodent in the family Cricetidae. It is found in Argentina, Bolivia, Chile, and Peru.
