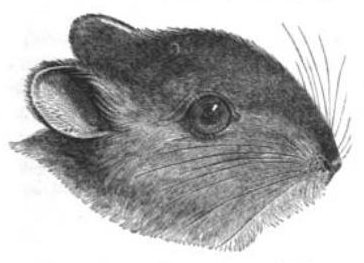
- Bunny rat (Reithrodon auritus)

Scientific classification
- Kingdom: Animalia
- Phylum: Chordata
- Class: Mammalia
- Order: Rodentia
- Family: Cricetidae
- Subfamily: Sigmodontinae
- Tribe: Phyllotini
- Genus: Reithrodon; Waterhouse, 1837

Type species
- Reithrodon typicus

Species
- Reithrodon auritus Reithrodon typicus

= Reithrodon =

Reithrodon Temporal range: Late Pliocene - Recent

Genus of rodents

Reithrodon is a genus of rodent in the family Cricetidae. It contains the following living species:

- Bunny rat (Reithrodon auritus)
- Naked-soled conyrat (Reithrodon typicus)

The scientific name translates as "channel tooth" and refers to grooves on the upper incisors. The oldest fossils date from the late Pliocene, about four million years ago. The immediate ancestors of the genus may have evolved as the southern regions of South America became increasingly arid around the end of the Miocene.
