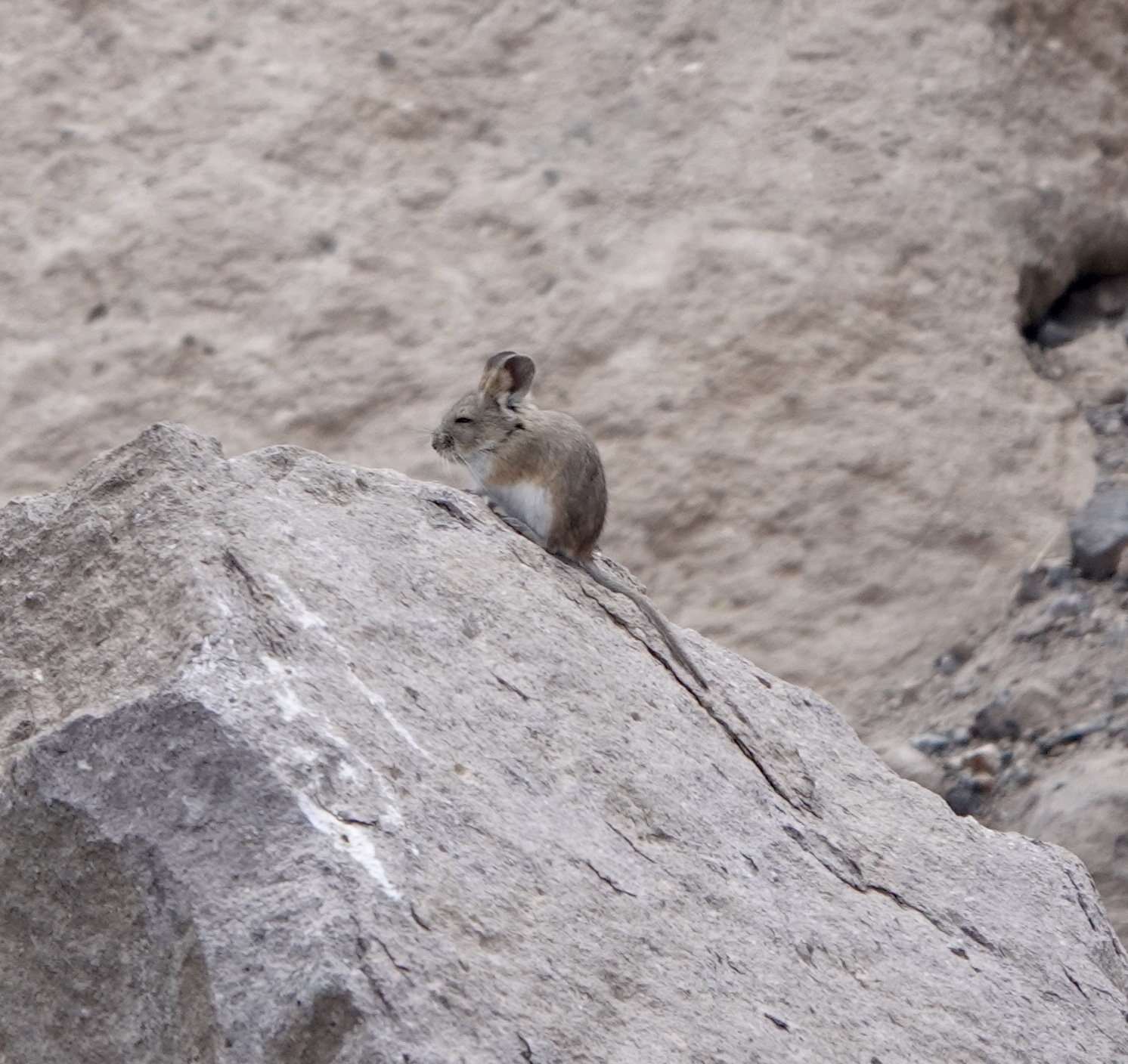

Conservation status
- Least Concern (IUCN 3.1)

Scientific classification
- Kingdom: Animalia
- Phylum: Chordata
- Class: Mammalia
- Order: Rodentia
- Family: Cricetidae
- Subfamily: Sigmodontinae
- Genus: Auliscomys
- Species: A. boliviensis

Binomial name
- Auliscomys boliviensis (Waterhouse, 1846)

= Bolivian big-eared mouse =

Species of rodent

The Bolivian big-eared mouse (Auliscomys boliviensis) is a species of rodent in the family Muridae. It is found in Bolivia, Chile, and Peru.
