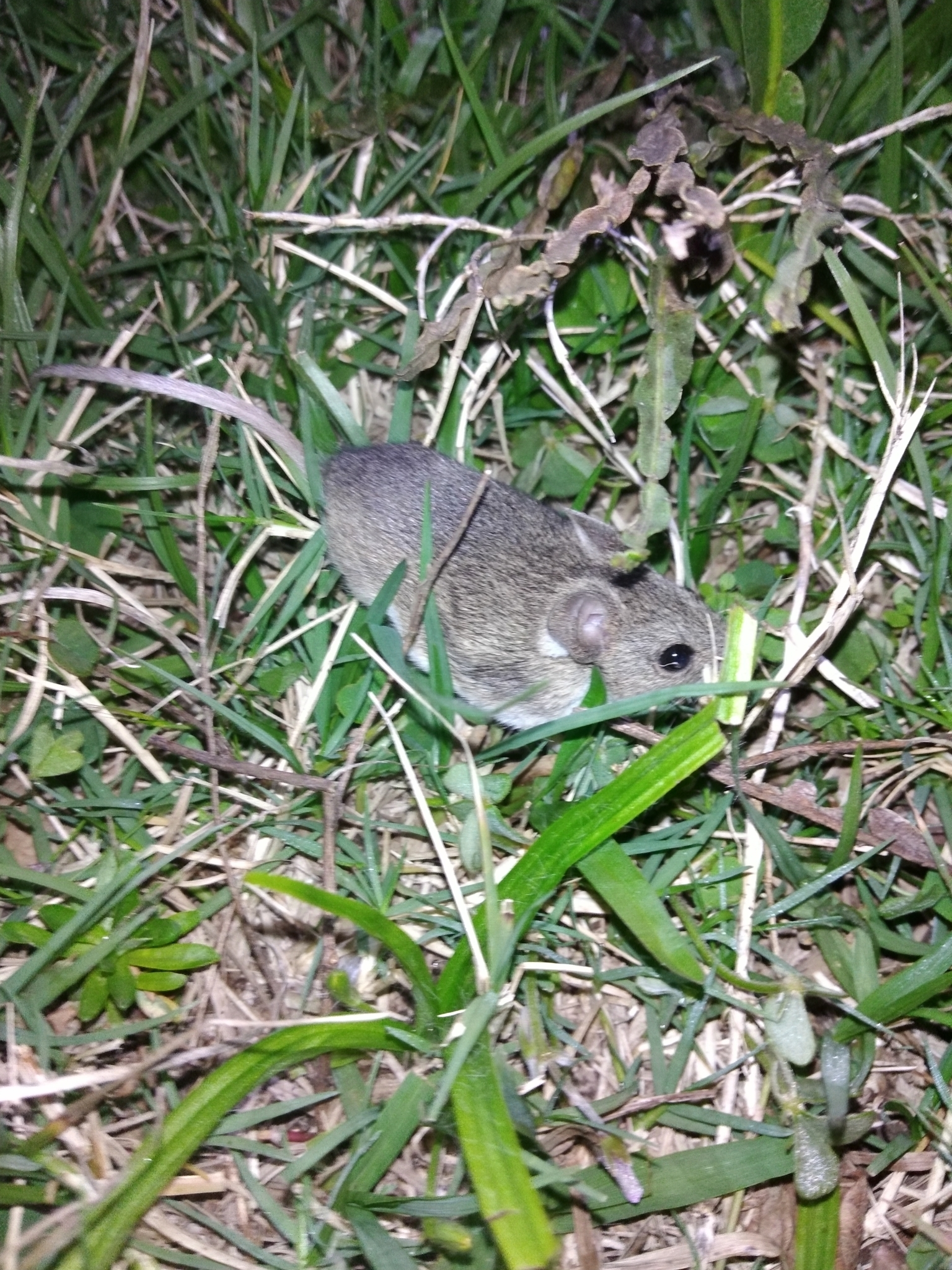

Conservation status
- Least Concern (IUCN 3.1)

Scientific classification
- Kingdom: Animalia
- Phylum: Chordata
- Class: Mammalia
- Order: Rodentia
- Family: Cricetidae
- Subfamily: Sigmodontinae
- Genus: Reithrodon
- Species: R. typicus

Binomial name
- Reithrodon typicus Waterhouse, 1837

= Naked-soled conyrat =

Species of rodent

The naked-soled conyrat (Reithrodon typicus) is a species of rodent in the family Cricetidae. It is an herbivore of grasslands in northern Argentina, southern Brazil, and Uruguay.

Its karyotype has 2n = 28.
