= Chelemys macronyx =

Conservation status
- Least Concern (IUCN 3.1)

Scientific classification
- Kingdom: Animalia
- Phylum: Chordata
- Class: Mammalia
- Order: Rodentia
- Family: Cricetidae
- Subfamily: Sigmodontinae
- Genus: Chelemys
- Species: C. macronyx

Binomial name
- Chelemys macronyx (Thomas, 1894)

Synonyms
- Acodon [sic] macronyx Thomas, 1894 lapsus; Akodon (Chelemys) vestitus Thomas, 1903; Notiomys vestitus alleni Osgood, 1925; Notiomys connectens Osgood, 1925; Notiomys vestitus fumosus Thomas, 1927

Species of rodent

Chelemys macronyx, also known as the Andean long-clawed mouse or Andean long-clawed akodont, is a species of rodent in the genus Chelemys of family Cricetidae. It is native to Argentina and Chile, where it is found in Patagonian Nothofagus forest and adjacent grasslands.
