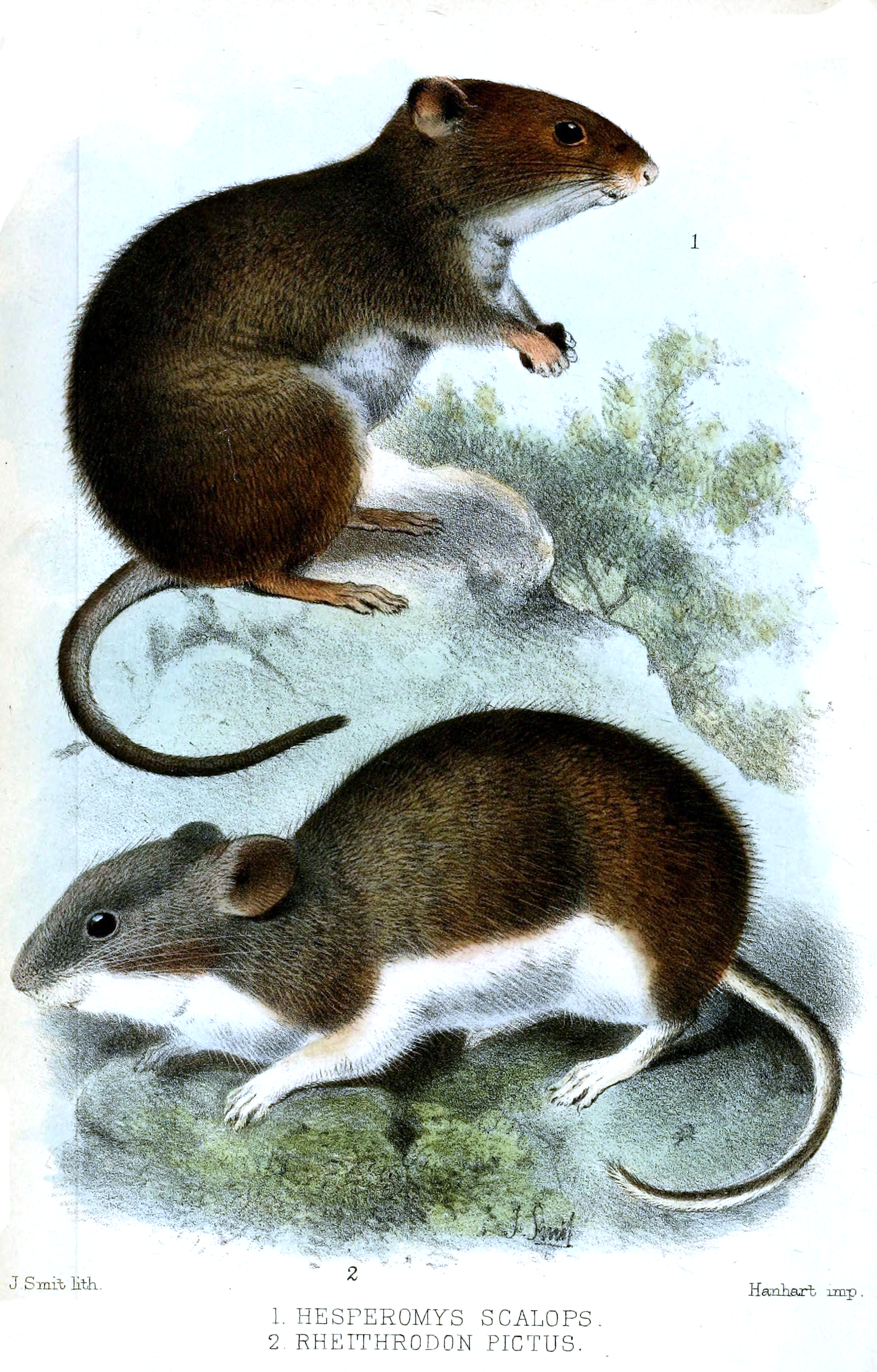
- Chelemys megalonyx is the upper animal

Scientific classification
- Domain: Eukaryota
- Kingdom: Animalia
- Phylum: Chordata
- Class: Mammalia
- Order: Rodentia
- Family: Cricetidae
- Subfamily: Sigmodontinae
- Tribe: Abrotrichini
- Genus: Chelemys; Thomas, 1903

Type species
- Akodon megalonyx Waterhouse, 1843

Species
- Chelemys delfini Chelemys macronyx Chelemys megalonyx

= Chelemys =

Genus of rodents

Chelemys is a genus of South American rodents in the tribe Abrotrichini of family Cricetidae. Three species—Chelemys delfini, Chelemys macronyx, and Chelemys megalonyx—are known, all found in central and southern Chile and Argentina.

== Literature cited ==
- Musser, G.G. and Carleton, M.D. 2005. Superfamily Muroidea. Pp. 894–1531 in Wilson, D.E. and Reeder, D.M. (eds.). Mammal Species of the World: a taxonomic and geographic reference. 3rd ed. Baltimore: The Johns Hopkins University Press, 2 vols., 2142 pp. ISBN 978-0-8018-8221-0
