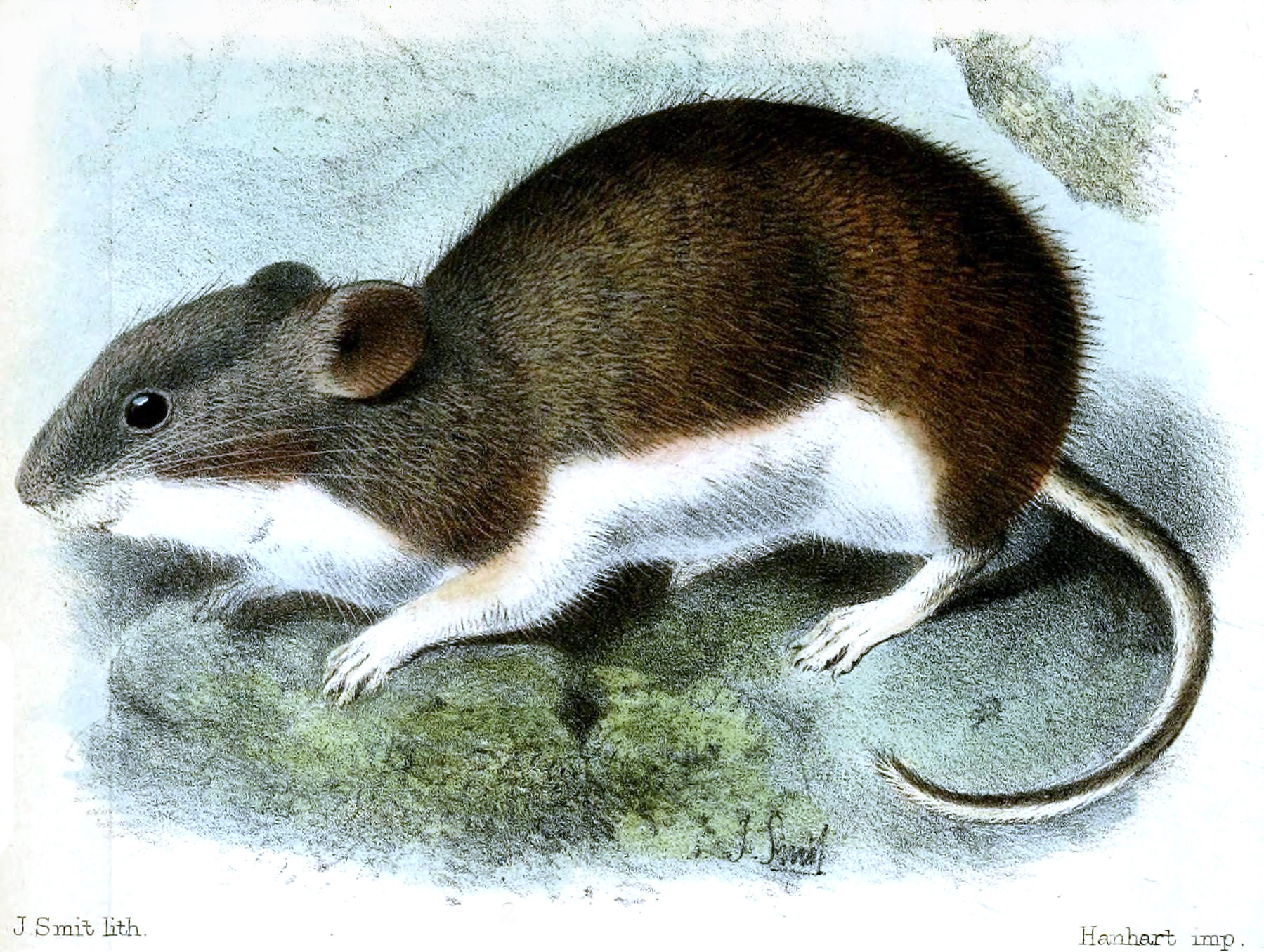

Conservation status
- Least Concern (IUCN 3.1)

Scientific classification
- Kingdom: Animalia
- Phylum: Chordata
- Class: Mammalia
- Infraclass: Placentalia
- Order: Rodentia
- Family: Cricetidae
- Subfamily: Sigmodontinae
- Genus: Auliscomys
- Species: A. pictus

Binomial name
- Auliscomys pictus (Thomas, 1884)

= Painted big-eared mouse =

painted big-eared mouse

Species of rodent

The painted big-eared mouse (Auliscomys pictus) is a species of rodent in the family Cricetidae. It is found in Bolivia and Peru, and possibly Chile.
