= Andean mouse =

Andean mouse Temporal range: Pleistocene to Recent

Conservation status
- Least Concern (IUCN 3.1)

Scientific classification
- Kingdom: Animalia
- Phylum: Chordata
- Class: Mammalia
- Order: Rodentia
- Family: Cricetidae
- Subfamily: Sigmodontinae
- Genus: Andinomys; Thomas, 1902
- Species: A. edax

Binomial name
- Andinomys edax Thomas, 1902

Species of rodent

The Andean mouse (Andinomys edax) is a species of rodent in the family Cricetidae. It is the only species in the genus Andinomys. It is found in Argentina, Bolivia, Chile, and Peru.

Andinomys edax has great ecological plasticity since it can live in very different environments, including subtropical mountain forests, high-altitude grasslands, and semiarid areas. Though the species lacks comprehensive fossil records, there is one known fossil record from the Lower-Middle Pleistocene in Tarija, Bolivia, and seven fossil records from the Middle-Upper Pleistocene, the Upper Pleistocene, and the Upper Holocene in different provinces of Northwestern Argentina.
