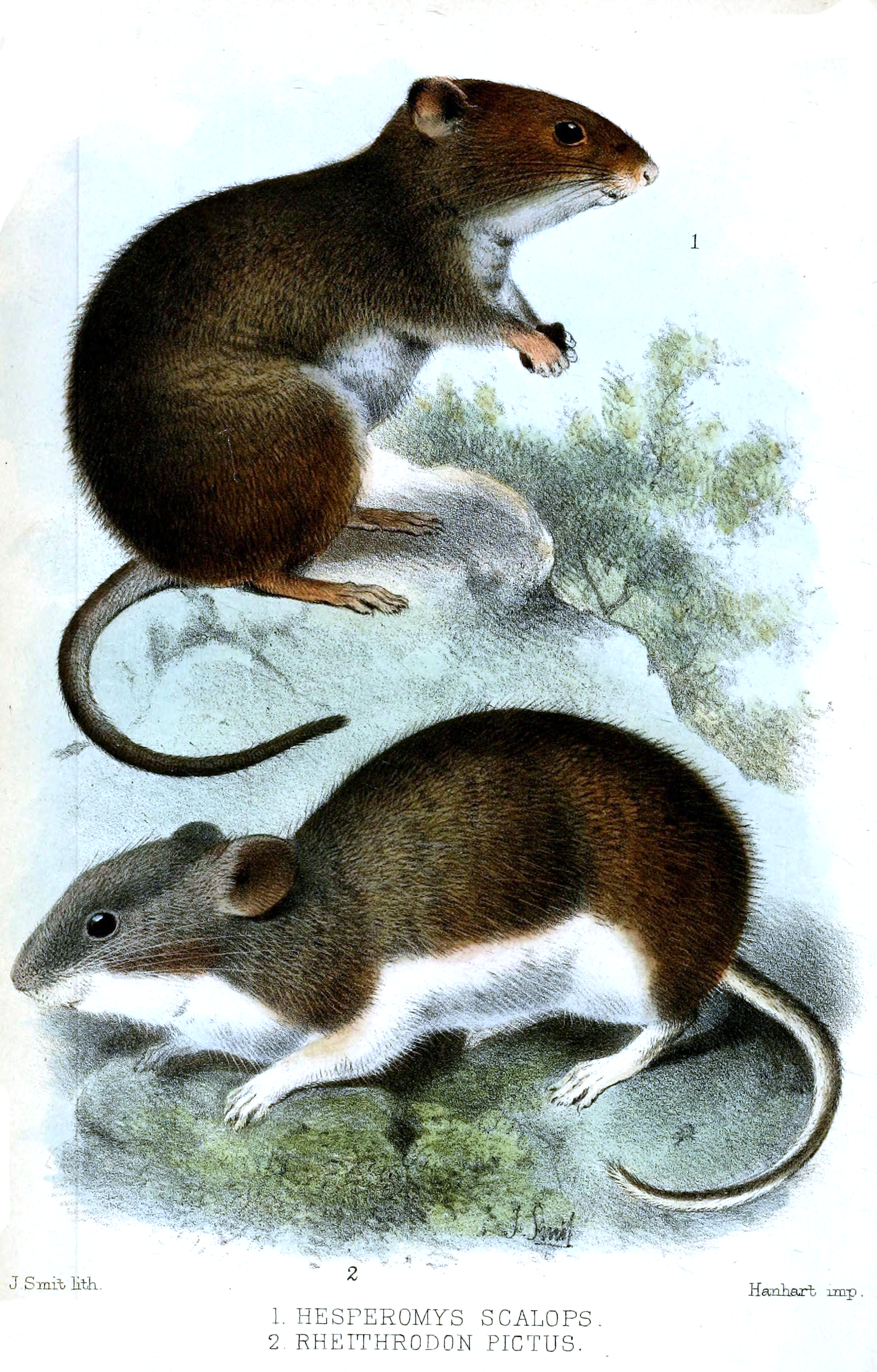
- Chelemys megalonyx is the upper animal

Conservation status
- Near Threatened (IUCN 3.1)

Scientific classification
- Kingdom: Animalia
- Phylum: Chordata
- Class: Mammalia
- Order: Rodentia
- Family: Cricetidae
- Subfamily: Sigmodontinae
- Genus: Chelemys
- Species: C. megalonyx

Binomial name
- Chelemys megalonyx (Waterhouse, 1845)

Synonyms
- Hesperomys megalonyx Waterhouse, 1845; Mus microtis Philippi, 1900; Oxymycterus niger Philippi, 1872; Oxymicterus scalops Gray, 1847

= Chelemys megalonyx =

Species of rodent

Chelemys megalonyx, also known as the large long-clawed mouse or large long-clawed akodont is a species of rodent in the genus Chelemys of family Cricetidae. It is endemic to central Chile.

== Literature cited ==
- Musser, G. G.; Carleton, M. D. (2005). "Superfamily Muroidea". In Wilson, D. E.; Reeder, D. M. (eds.). Mammal Species of the World: A Taxonomic and Geographic Reference (3rd ed.). Johns Hopkins University Press. pp. 894–1531. ISBN 978-0-8018-8221-0. OCLC 62265494.
