= Organisms at high altitude =

Organisms capable of living at high altitudes

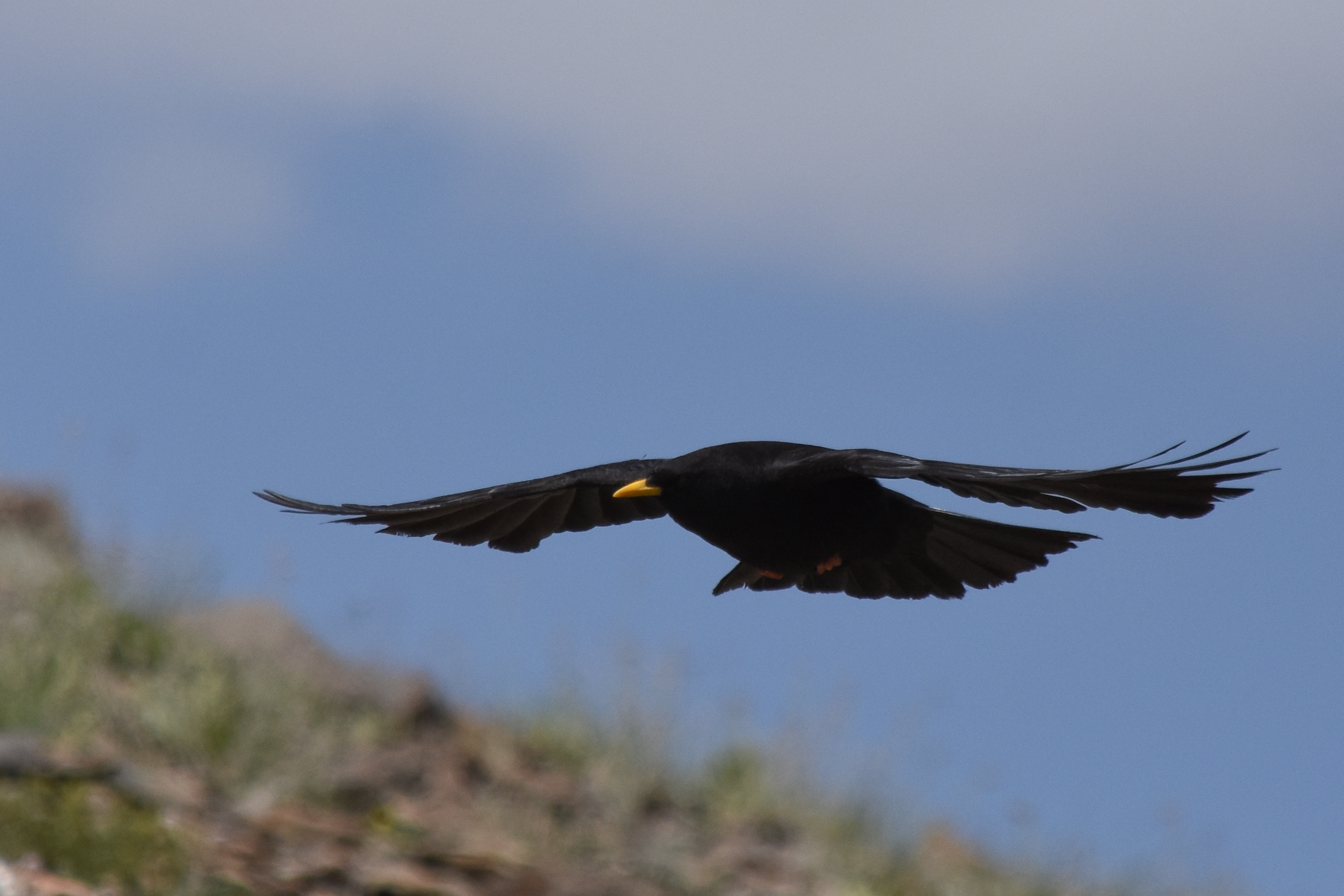
An Alpine chough in flight at 3,900 m (12,800 ft)

Organisms can live at high altitude, either on land, in water, or while flying. Decreased oxygen availability and decreased temperature make life at such altitudes challenging, though many species have been successfully adapted via considerable physiological changes. As opposed to short-term acclimatisation (immediate physiological response to changing environment), high-altitude adaptation means irreversible, evolved physiological responses to high-altitude environments, associated with heritable behavioural and genetic changes. Among vertebrates, only a few mammals (such as leaf-eared mice, yaks, ibexes, Tibetan gazelles, vicunas, llamas, mountain goats, etc.) and certain birds are known to have completely adapted to their high-altitude environments.

Human populations such as some Tibetans, South Americans and Ethiopians live in the otherwise uninhabitable high mountains of the Himalayas, Andes and Ethiopian Highlands respectively. The adaptation of humans to high altitude is an example of natural selection in action.

High-altitude adaptations provide examples of convergent evolution, with adaptations occurring simultaneously on three continents. Tibetan humans and Tibetan domestic dogs share a genetic mutation in EPAS1, but it has not been seen in Andean humans.

== Invertebrates ==
Tardigrades live over the entire world, including the high Himalayas. Tardigrades are also able to survive temperatures of close to absolute zero (−273 °C or −459 °F), temperatures as high as 151 °C (304 °F), radiation that would kill other animals, and almost a decade without water. Since 2007, tardigrades have also returned alive from studies in which they have been exposed to the vacuum of outer space in low Earth orbit.

Other invertebrates with high-altitude habitats are Euophrys omnisuperstes, a spider that lives in the Himalaya range at altitudes of up to 6,700 m (22,000 ft); it feeds on stray insects that are blown up the mountain by the wind. The springtail Hypogastrura nivicola (one of several insects called snow fleas) also lives in the Himalayas. It is active in the dead of winter, its blood containing a compound similar to antifreeze. Some allow themselves to become dehydrated instead, preventing the formation of ice crystals within their body.

Insects can fly and kite at very high altitude. Flies are common in the Himalayas up to 6,300 m (20,700 ft). Bumble bees were discovered on Mount Everest at more than 5,600 m (18,400 ft) above sea level. In subsequent tests, bumblebees were still able to fly in a flight chamber which recreated the thinner air of 9,000 m (30,000 ft).

Ballooning is a term used for the mechanical kiting that many spiders, especially small species such as Erigone atra, as well as certain mites and some caterpillars use to disperse through the air. Some spiders have been detected in atmospheric data balloons collecting air samples at slightly less than 5 km (16,000 ft) above sea level. It is the most common way for spiders to pioneer isolated islands and mountaintops.

== Fish ==
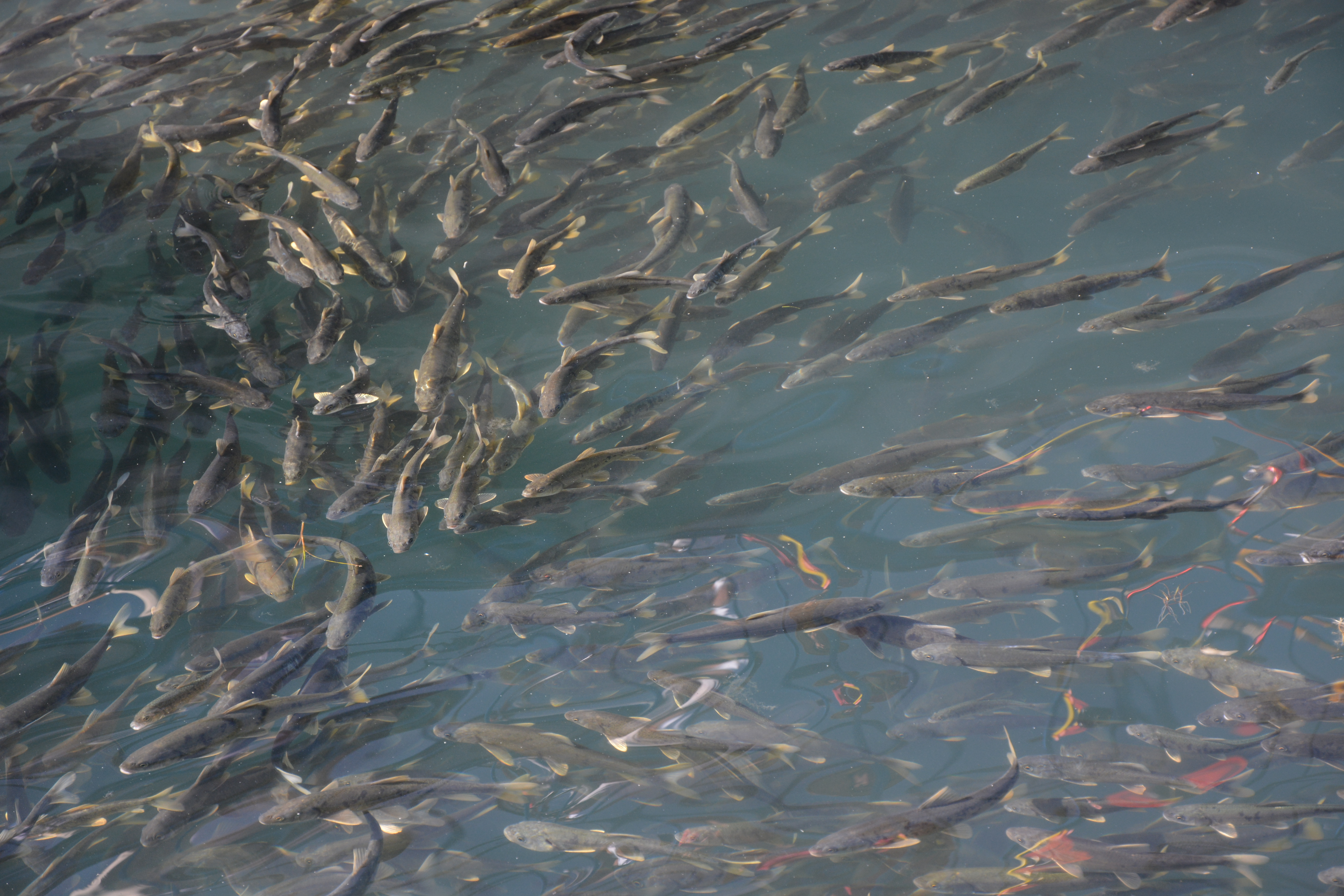
Naked carp in Lake Qinghai at 3,205 m (10,515 ft)

Fish at high altitudes have a lower metabolic rate, as has been shown in highland westslope cutthroat trout when compared to introduced lowland rainbow trout in the Oldman River basin. There is also a general trend of smaller body sizes and lower species richness at high altitudes observed in aquatic invertebrates, likely due to lower oxygen partial pressures. These factors may decrease productivity in high altitude habitats, meaning there will be less energy available for consumption, growth, and activity, which provides an advantage to fish with lower metabolic demands.

The naked carp from Lake Qinghai, like other members of the carp family, can use gill remodelling to increase oxygen uptake in hypoxic environments. The response of naked carp to cold and low-oxygen conditions seem to be at least partly mediated by hypoxia-inducible factor 1 (HIF-1). It is unclear whether this is a common characteristic in other high altitude dwelling fish or if gill remodelling and HIF-1 use for cold adaptation are limited to carp.

== Mammals ==
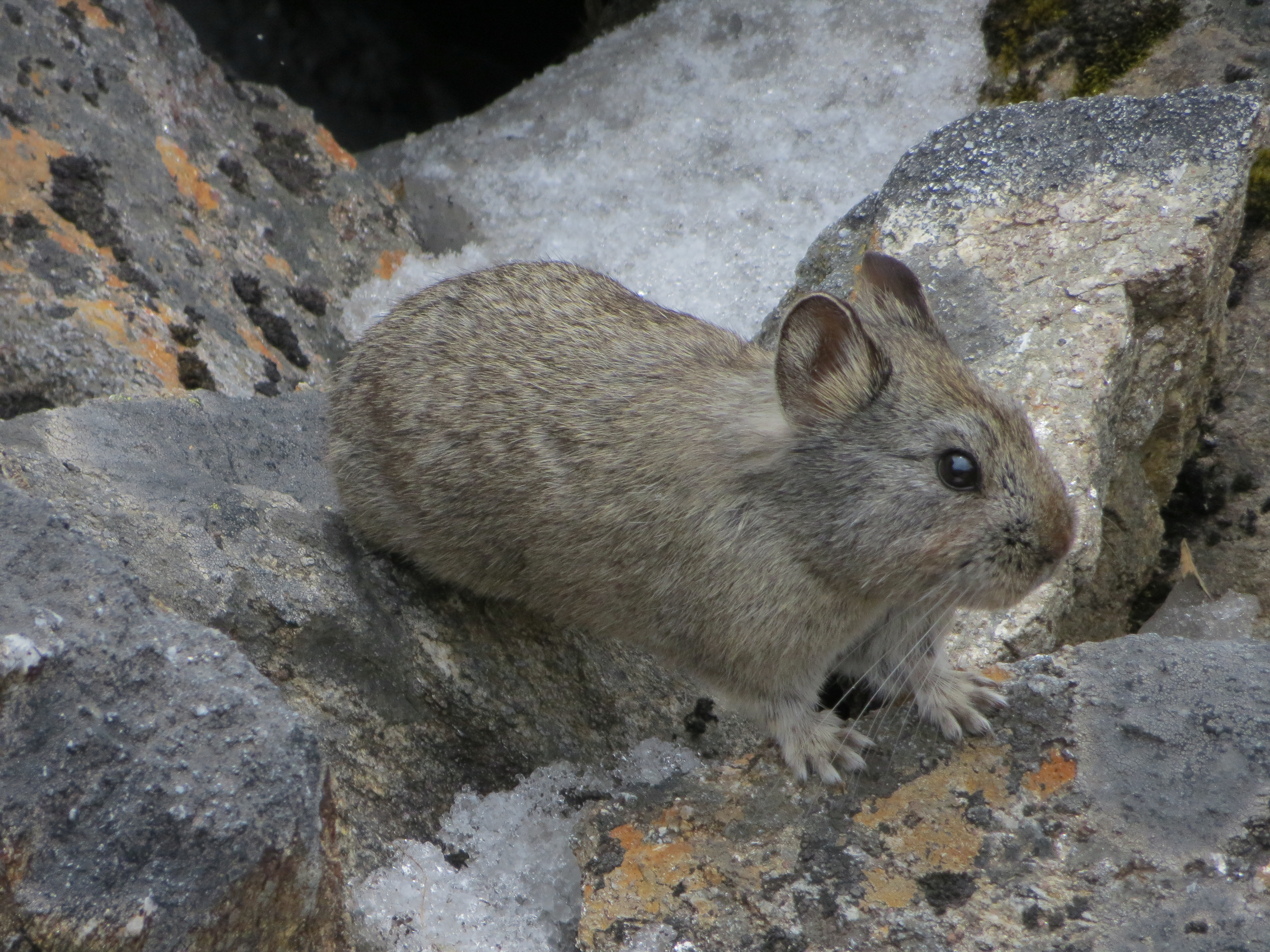
The Himalayan pika lives at altitudes up to 4,200 m (13,800 ft)

Mammals are also known to reside at high altitude and exhibit a striking number of adaptations in terms of morphology, physiology and behaviour. The Tibetan Plateau has very few mammalian species, ranging from wolf, kiang (Tibetan wild ass), goas, chiru (Tibetan antelope), wild yak, snow leopard, Tibetan sand fox, ibex, gazelle, Himalayan brown bear and water buffalo.

Among domesticated animals, yaks are perhaps the highest dwelling animals. The wild herbivores of the Himalayas such as the Himalayan tahr, markhor and chamois are of particular interest because of their ecological versatility and tolerance.

=== Rodents ===
A number of rodents live at high altitude, including deer mice, guinea pigs, and rats. The highest-elevation observation of a rodent is the yellow-rumped leaf-eared mouse (Phyllotis xanthopygus rupestris), trapped at the summit of Llullaillaco in the Andes at 6,739 metres (22,110 ft). This observation makes P. xanthopygus rupestris the highest-dwelling mammal.

Several mechanisms help rodents survive these harsh conditions, including altered genetics of the hemoglobin gene in guinea pigs and deer mice. Deer mice use a high percentage of fats as metabolic fuel to retain carbohydrates for small bursts of energy.

Other physiological changes that occur in rodents at high altitude include increased breathing rate and altered morphology of the lungs and heart, allowing more efficient gas exchange and delivery. Lungs of high-altitude mice are larger, with more capillaries, and their hearts have a heavier right ventricle (the latter applies to rats too), which pumps blood to the lungs.

At high altitudes, some rodents even shift their thermal neutral zone so they may maintain normal basal metabolic rate at colder temperatures.

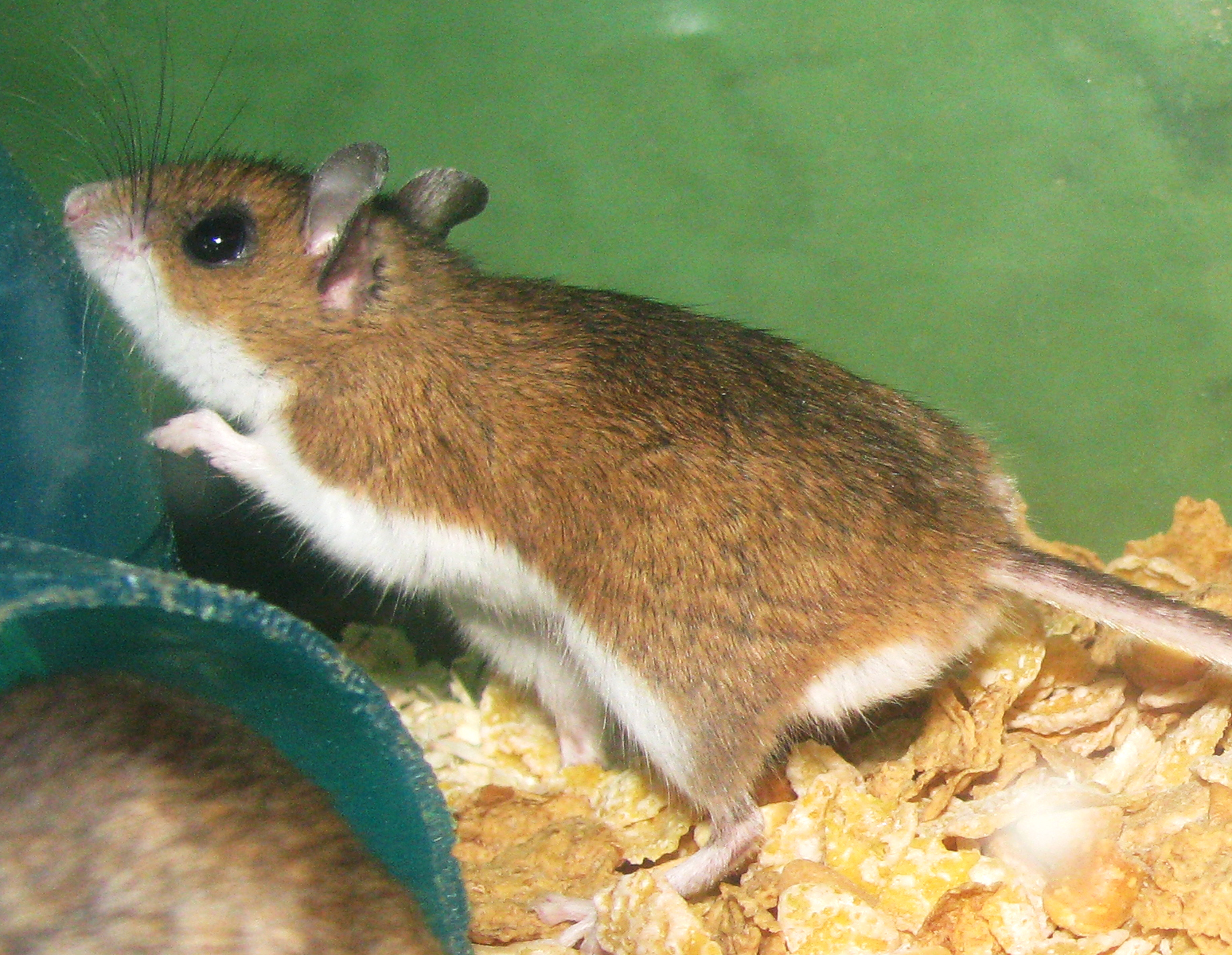
The deer mouse

The deer mouse (Peromyscus maniculatus) is the best studied species, other than humans, in terms of high-altitude adaptation. The deer mice native to Andes highlands (up to 3,000 m (9,800 ft)) are found to have relatively low hemoglobin content. Measurement of food intake, gut mass, and cardiopulmonary organ mass indicated proportional increases in mice living at high altitudes, which in turn show that life at high altitudes demands higher levels of energy. Variations in the globin genes (α and β-globin) seem to be the basis for increased oxygen-affinity of the hemoglobin and faster transport of oxygen. Structural comparisons show that in contrast to normal hemoglobin, the deer mouse hemoglobin lacks the hydrogen bond between α1Trp14 in the A helix and α1Thr67 in the E helix owing to the Thr67Ala substitution, and there is a unique hydrogen bond at the α1β1 interface between residues α1Cys34 and β1Ser128. The Peruvian native species of mice (Phyllotis andium and Phyllotis xanthopygus) have adapted to the high Andes by using proportionately more carbohydrates and have higher oxidative capacities of cardiac muscles compared to closely related native species residing at low-altitudes (100–300 m (330–980 ft)), (Phyllotis amicus and Phyllotis limatus). This shows that highland mice have evolved a metabolic process to economise oxygen usage for physical activities in the hypoxic conditions.

=== Yaks ===
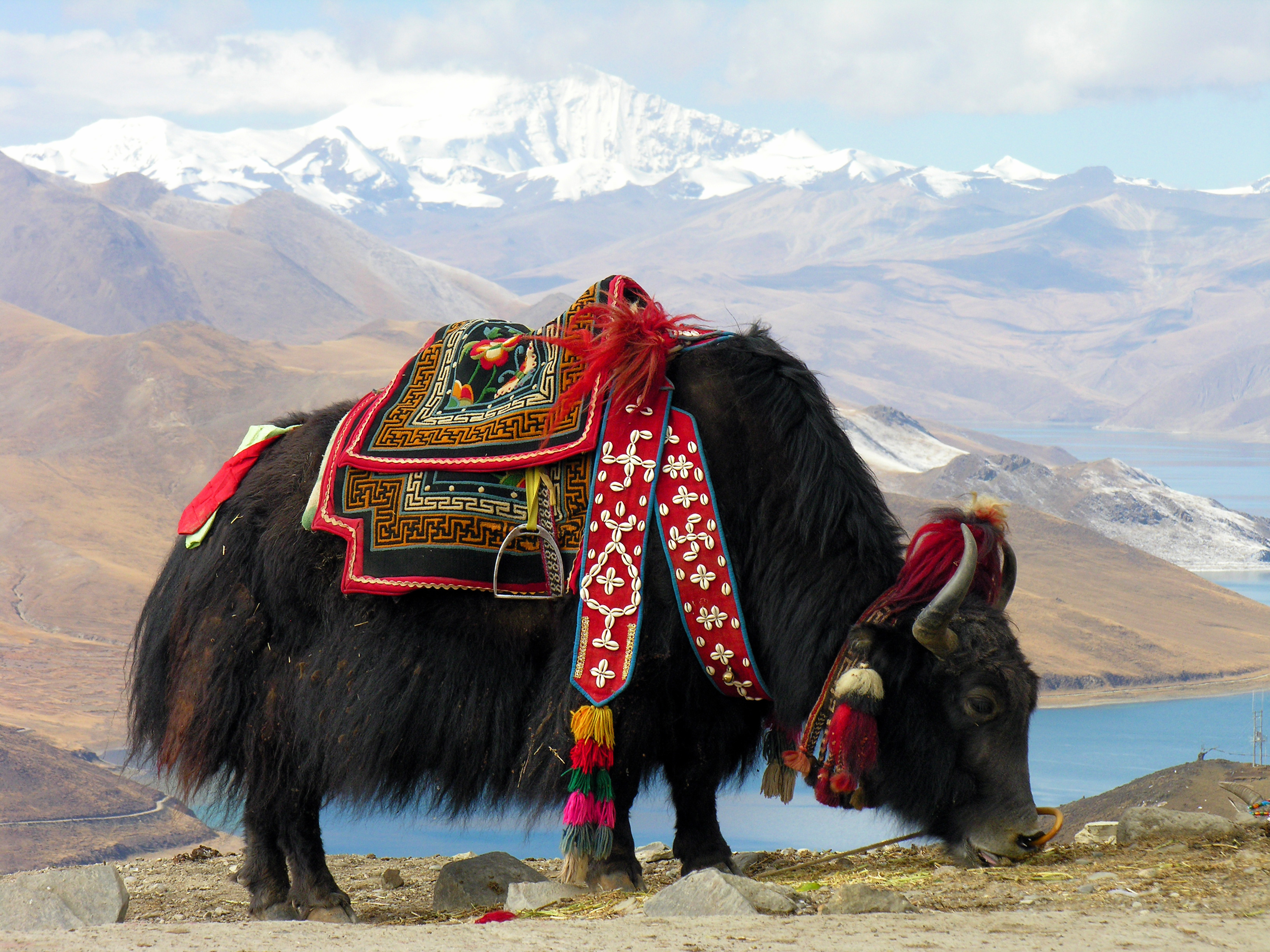
Domestic yak at Yamdrok Lake

Yaks (Bos grunniens) are the highest-dwelling domesticated animals in the world, living at 3,000–5,000 m (9,800–16,400 ft). The yak is the most important domesticated animal for Tibet highlanders in Qinghai Province of China, as the primary source of milk, meat and fertilizer. Unlike other yak or cattle species, which suffer from hypoxia in the Tibetan Plateau, the Tibetan domestic yaks thrive only at high altitude, and not in lowlands. Their physiology is well-adapted to high altitudes, with proportionately larger lungs and heart than other cattle, as well as greater capacity for transporting oxygen through their blood. In yaks, hypoxia-inducible factor 1 (HIF-1) has high expression in the brain, lung and kidney, showing that it plays an important role in the adaptation to low oxygen environment. In 2012, the complete genomic sequence and analyses of a female domestic yak was announced, providing important insights into understanding mammalian divergence and adaptation at high altitude. Distinct gene expansions related to sensory perception and energy metabolism were identified. In addition, researchers also found an enrichment of protein domains related to the extracellular environment and hypoxic stress that had undergone positive selection and rapid evolution. For example, they found three genes that may play important roles in regulating the bodyʼs response to hypoxia, and five genes that were related to the optimisation of the energy from the food scarcity in the extreme environment of Tibet. One gene known to be involved in regulating response to low oxygen levels, ADAM17, has different allele frequencies in both high-elevation yaks and human Tibetan highlanders.

=== Humans ===
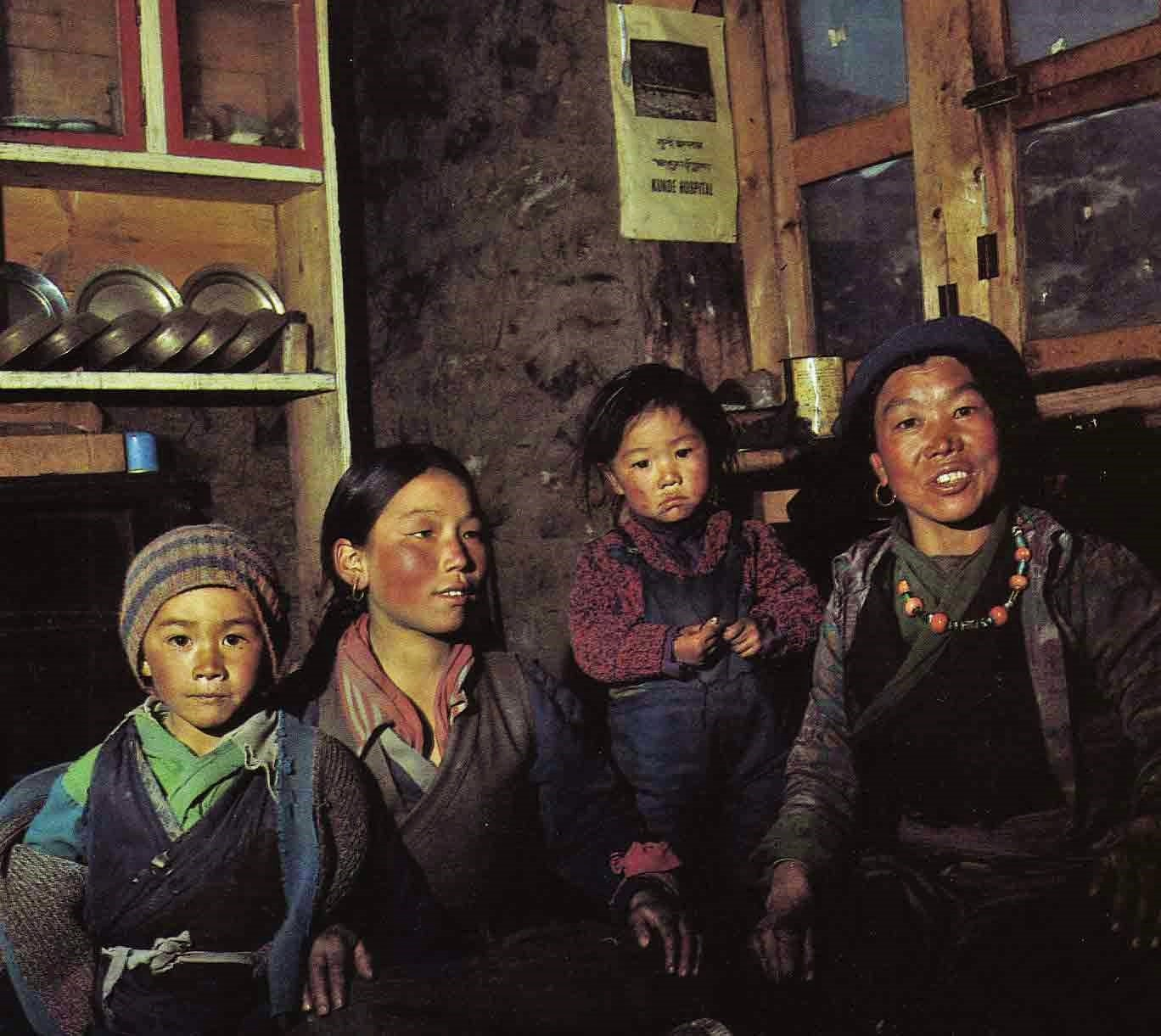
A Sherpa family

Over 81 million people live permanently at high altitudes (>2,500 m or 8,200 ft) in North, Central and South America, East Africa, and Asia, and have flourished for millennia in the exceptionally high mountains, without any apparent complications. For average human populations, a brief stay at these places can risk mountain sickness. For the native highlanders, there are no adverse effects to staying at high altitude.

The physiological and genetic adaptations in native highlanders involve modification in the oxygen transport system of the blood, especially molecular changes in the structure and functions of hemoglobin, a protein for carrying oxygen in the body. This is to compensate for the low oxygen environment. This adaptation is associated with developmental patterns such as high birth weight, increased lung volumes, increased breathing, and higher resting metabolism.

The genome of Tibetans provided the first clue to the molecular evolution of high-altitude adaptation in 2010. Genes such as EPAS1, PPARA and EGLN1 are found to have significant molecular changes among the Tibetans, and the genes are involved in hemoglobin production. These genes function in concert with transcription factors, hypoxia inducible factors (HIF), which in turn are central mediators of red blood cell production in response to oxygen metabolism. Further, the Tibetans are enriched for genes in the disease class of human reproduction (such as genes from the DAZ, BPY2, CDY, and HLA-DQ and HLA-DR gene clusters) and biological process categories of response to DNA damage stimulus and DNA repair (such as RAD51, RAD52, and MRE11A), which are related to the adaptive traits of high infant birth weight and darker skin tone and, are most likely due to recent local adaptation.

Among the Andeans, there are no significant associations between EPAS1 or EGLN1 and hemoglobin concentration, indicating variation in the pattern of molecular adaptation. However, EGLN1 appears to be the principal signature of evolution, as it shows evidence of positive selection in both Tibetans and Andeans. The adaptive mechanism is different among the Ethiopian highlanders. Genomic analysis of two ethnic groups, Amhara and Oromo, revealed that gene variations associated with hemoglobin differences among Tibetans or other variants at the same gene location do not influence the adaptation in Ethiopians. Instead, several other genes appear to be involved in Ethiopians, including MICU1, VAV3, ARNT2 and THRB, which are known to play a role in HIF genetic functions.

The EPAS1 mutation in the Tibetan population has been linked to Denisovan-related populations. The Tibetan haplotype is more similar to the Denisovan haplotype than any modern human haplotype. This mutation is seen at a high frequency in the Tibetan population, a low frequency in the Han population and is otherwise only seen in a sequenced Denisovan individual. This mutation must have been present before the Han and Tibetan populations diverged 2750 years ago.

== Birds ==
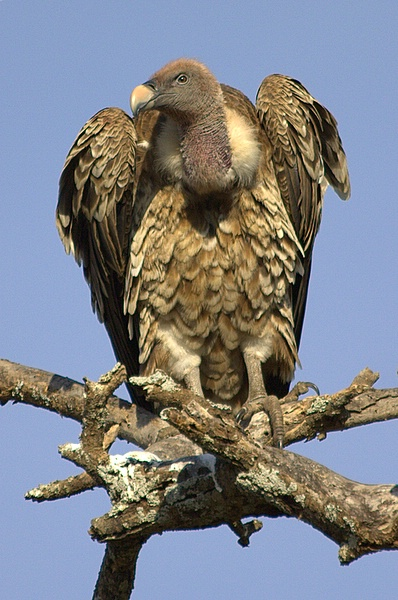
Rüppell's vulture can fly up to 11.2 km (7.0 mi) above sea level

Birds have been especially successful at living at high altitudes. In general, birds have physiological features that are advantageous for high-altitude flight. The respiratory system of birds moves oxygen across the pulmonary surface during both inhalation and exhalation, making it more efficient than that of mammals. In addition, the air circulates in one direction through the parabronchioles in the lungs. Parabronchioles are oriented perpendicularly to the pulmonary arteries, forming a cross-current gas exchanger. This arrangement allows for more oxygen to be extracted compared to mammalian concurrent gas exchange; as oxygen diffuses down its concentration gradient and the air gradually becomes more deoxygenated, the pulmonary arteries are still able to extract oxygen. Birds also have a high capacity for oxygen delivery to the tissues because they have larger hearts and cardiac stroke volume compared to mammals of similar body size. Additionally, they have increased vascularization in their flight muscle due to increased branching of the capillaries and small muscle fibres (which increases surface-area-to-volume ratio). These two features facilitate oxygen diffusion from the blood to muscle, allowing flight to be sustained during environmental hypoxia. Birds' hearts and brains, which are very sensitive to arterial hypoxia, are more vascularized compared to those of mammals. The bar-headed goose (Anser indicus) is an iconic high-flyer that surmounts the Himalayas during migration, and serves as a model system for derived physiological adaptations for high-altitude flight. Rüppell's vultures, whooper swans, alpine chough, and common cranes all have flown more than 8 km (26,000 ft) above sea level.

Adaptation to high altitude has fascinated ornithologists for decades, but only a small proportion of high-altitude species have been studied. In Tibet, few birds are found (28 endemic species), including cranes, vultures, hawks, jays and geese. The Andes is quite rich in bird diversity. The Andean condor, the largest bird of its kind in the Western Hemisphere, occurs throughout much of the Andes but generally in very low densities; species of tinamous (notably members of the genus Nothoprocta), Andean goose, giant coot, Andean flicker, diademed sandpiper-plover, mountain parakeet, miners, sierra-finches and diuca-finches are also found in the highlands.

=== Cinnamon teal ===
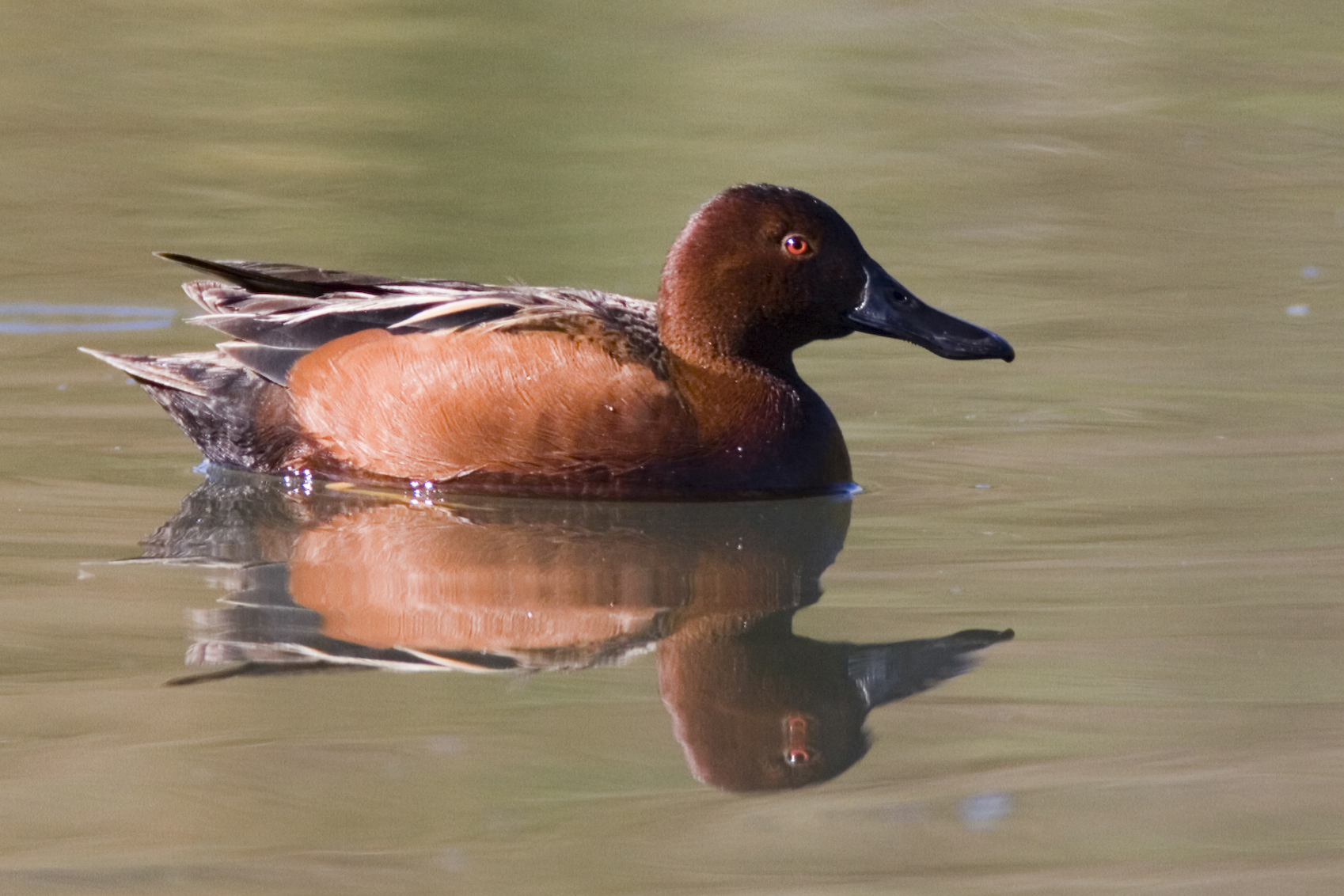
Male cinnamon teal

Evidence for adaptation is best investigated among the Andean birds. The water fowls and cinnamon teal (Anas cyanoptera) are found to have undergone significant molecular modifications. It is now known that the α-hemoglobin subunit gene is highly structured between elevations among cinnamon teal populations, which involves almost entirely a single non-synonymous amino acid substitution at position 9 of the protein, with asparagine present almost exclusively within the low-elevation species, and serine in the high-elevation species. This implies important functional consequences for oxygen affinity. In addition, there is strong divergence in body size in the Andes and adjacent lowlands. These changes have shaped distinct morphological and genetic divergence within South American cinnamon teal populations.

=== Ground tits ===
In 2013, the molecular mechanism of high-altitude adaptation was elucidated in the Tibetan ground tit (Pseudopodoces humilis) using a draft genome sequence. Gene family expansion and positively selected gene analysis revealed genes that were related to cardiac function in the ground tit. Some of the genes identified to have positive selection include ADRBK1 and HSD17B7, which are involved in the adrenaline response and steroid hormone biosynthesis. Thus, the strengthened hormonal system is an adaptation strategy of this bird.

== Other animals ==
Alpine Tibet hosts a limited diversity of animal species, among which snakes are common. There are only two endemic reptiles and ten endemic amphibians in the Tibetan highlands. Gloydius himalayanus is perhaps the geographically highest living snake in the world, living at as high as 4,900 m (16,100 ft) in the Himalayas. Another notable species is the Himalayan jumping spider, which can live at over 6,500 m (21,300 ft) of elevation.

== Plants ==
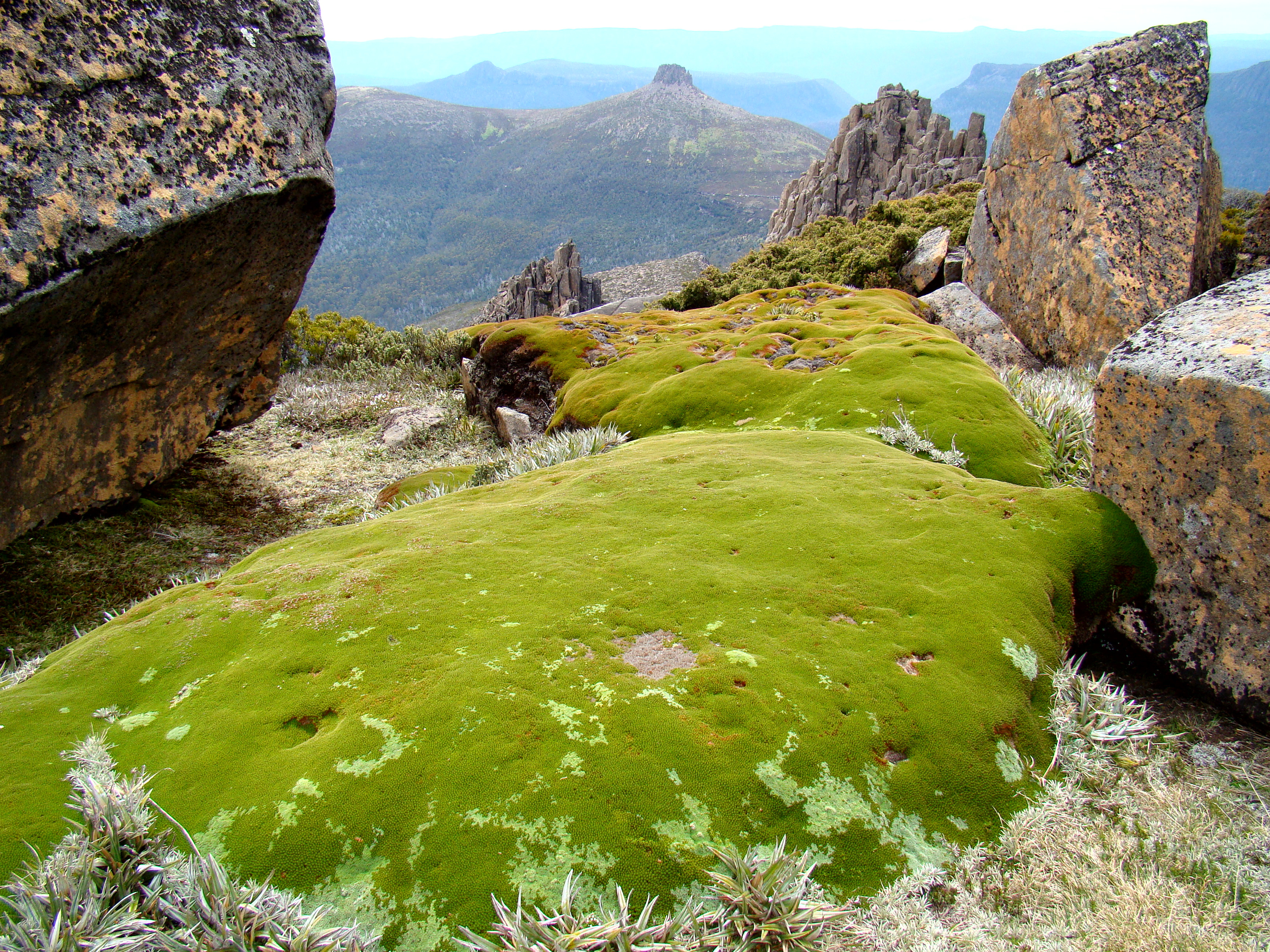
Cushion plant Donatia novae-zelandiae, Tasmania

Many different plant species live in the high-altitude environment. These include perennial grasses, sedges, forbs, cushion plants, mosses, and lichens. High-altitude plants must adapt to the harsh conditions of their environment, which include low temperatures, dryness, ultraviolet radiation, and a short growing season. Trees cannot grow at high altitude, because of cold temperature or lack of available moisture. The lack of trees causes an ecotone, or boundary, that is obvious to observers. This boundary is known as the tree line.

The highest-altitude plant species is a moss that grows at 6,480 m (21,260 ft) on Mount Everest. The sandwort Arenaria bryophylla is the highest flowering plant in the world, occurring as high as 6,180 m (20,280 ft).

== See also ==
- Aeroplankton
- Alpine plant
- Altitude
- Animals in space
- Ethiopian Highlands
- Fauna of the Andes
- Health threat from cosmic rays
- Human spaceflight
- Plants in space
- Skylab Medical Experiment Altitude Test
