= Pichu Pichu =

Mountain in Peru

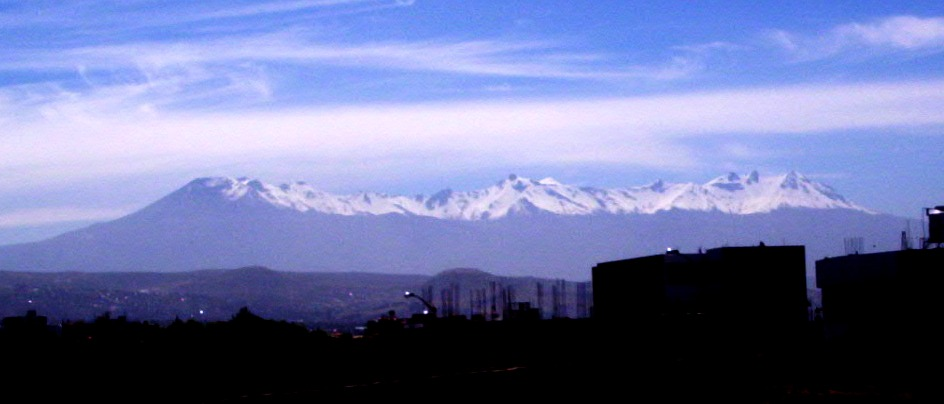

Highest point
- Elevation: 5,664 m (18,583 ft)
- Listing: List of mountains in the Andes
- Coordinates: 16°26′28″S 71°14′25″W

Geography
- Location within Peru
- Location: Arequipa, Peru
- Parent range: Andes

Pichu Pichu is an inactive eroded volcano in the Andes of Peru, with seven summits; the highest reaches a height of 5,664 metres (18,583 ft). It lies east of the city Arequipa and together with its neighbours Misti and Chachani is part of the Central Volcanic Zone of the Andes. Pichu Pichu was active many millions of years ago, producing ignimbrites and lava flows with andesitic composition. During the last two million years, a gigantic landslide descended the western side of the volcano and left a large scar that runs north to south. Pichu Pichu bore glaciers during the last glacial maximum, which left moraines and other glacial landforms after they retreated.

Presently, the mountain is covered with snow only during the summer months, when the monsoon brings precipitation from the Amazon; the last permanent ice disappeared during the last decades. Pichu Pichu is an important source of water for its surroundings. Parts of its flanks are forested, and numerous mammal species have been identified on the mountain.

The Inca built a path on to the mountain and offered human sacrifices, capacochas, on Pichu Pichu. Three mummies, two girls and one boy, were discovered between 1960 and 1996 under a platform close to the summit of the volcano. The mountain was considered to be the seat of a deity, and offerings continue to be made to it.

== Name and climbing ==
The name possibly stems from Quechua pikchu, meaning "summit". The duplication indicates that there are multiple summits. Another etymology relates it to picu, "wooly tuft", reflecting the appearance of the debris pile surrounding the mountain. Thor Heyerdahl linked the word pikopiko to the name Pichu Pichu. An older name of the mountain is "Tunupa".

Ascents usually take place in the months between April and November. The easiest to reach summit has an elevation of 5,515 metres (18,094 ft) above sea level. From there, one can see the Salinas y Aguada Blanca National Reserve and the city of Arequipa. Part of the mountain is in the nature reserve. It is also used for mountain biking.

== Geography and geomorphology ==
Pichu Pichu is 25 kilometres (16 mi) east of and 3.2 kilometres (2.0 mi) above Arequipa, and the town Chiguata is on its foot, while the town of Chilita and the salt flat Laguna Salinas lie east of the volcano. The frontier between the Arequipa and Moquegua Departments runs over the mountain. The roads between Arequipa and Juliaca and between Arequipa and Matalaque pass around the northern and eastern feet of the volcano, respectively. Together with its neighbours Chachani and Misti, it is part of the Cordillera Occidental at the edge of the Altiplano, and rises abruptly from the surrounding terrain.

The volcano consists of a 10 kilometres (6.2 mi) long northnorthwest-southsoutheast trending ridge with seven summits. The highest point (Coronado) has an altitude of 5,664 metres (18,583 ft) above sea level and a summit cross was placed on it before 1966. It lies at the top of a near-vertical drop. Other summits are 5,247 metres (17,215 ft) (at the northern end of the edifice), 5,425 metres (17,799 ft) (central portion of the ridge) and 5,416 metres (17,769 ft) (southern end of the ridge) high. One of the summits is known as La Horquetilla or Cerro de las Virgenes; in 1966 it was thought to be 5,664 metres (18,583 ft) high. Four volcanic craters have been recognized and are heavily eroded The upper flanks of the volcano are very steep and hard to access on the eastern and western side. Their original volcanic shape is best preserved on the northeastern side. The volcano covers an area of about 60 square kilometres (23 sq mi); glacial and fluvial deposits cover its lower flanks. During its activity, Pichu Pichu produced mudflows and ignimbrites that crop out on the western side of the volcano.

Above 4,200 metres (13,800 ft), the western face of Pichu Pichu is cut by a steep scarp formed by a giant landslide. Five distinct lobes of the landslide descended side-by side; they were highly mobile, running for a length of 28 kilometres (17 mi) over the Arequipa basin and burying older ignimbrites. The landslide generated the hilly "Arequipa landslide deposit", which covers an area of 100–200 square kilometres (39–77 sq mi) with 10–20 cubic kilometres (2.4–4.8 cu mi) of rock, consisting of several formations: A northern debris avalanche, a central deposit formed by concentrated flows and a southern lobe formed by lava blocks. It was violent enough to melt the rocks in the slide, forming pseudotachylite, and to erode the underlying rock. Water was squeezed upwards, forming muddy dykes within the landslide deposit and mudflows. The landslide is responsible for the arcuate shape of Pichu Pichu mountain and dammed the Andamayo River, forming a now-vanished lake at Chiguata.

It is not clear when the landslide occurred, but the ages of the underlying and overlying rocks constrain it to between 2.42 million and 34,000 years ago. After the landslide, the collapse scar was further modified by erosion, which formed additional scars and river valleys, and was covered by material from the other volcanoes in the area. It is possible that Pichu Pichu erupted again after the collapse. Originally, the collapse scar was interpreted as being due to glacial erosion. Landslides also occurred on the eastern flank.

== Geology ==
Off the western coast of South America, the Nazca Plate subducts beneath the South American Plate; this subduction is responsible for volcanism in southern Peru, which forms the Central Volcanic Zone (CVZ) of the Andes. The Peruvian CVZ includes (from north to south) Coropuna, Ampato, Chachani, Misti, Pichu Pichu, Ubinas, Huaynaputina, Ticsani and Tutupaca. Some of these volcanoes are among the highest in the world. Pichu Pichu, Misti and Chachani are a group of volcanoes close to Arequipa. Four stages of volcanism have been distinguished in southern Peru: The Cretaceous-Paleocene Toquepala Group, the Miocene Huaylillas and Tacaza Formations, and the Miocene-Quaternary Sencca Formation and Barroso Group; Pichu Pichu is part of the Barroso or Chila. Several faults run across the region, separating Misti from Pichu Pichu, and volcanoes have formed on them.

Pichu Pichu is a stratovolcano that formed on top of older lavas and ignimbrites 6.7 million years ago (potassium-argon dating). It is formed by andesitic lava flows and pyroclastics that contain phenocrysts of augite, hornblende, hypersthene and olivine. The composition of Pichu Pichu is typical for Andean volcanoes, but it has adakitic traits. The rocks occur in both brecciated and massive form. Pichu Pichu is extinct and heavily eroded. After activity ceased, a sector collapse at Misti covered Pichu Pichu's western flank. A fault runs between Pichu Pichu and Coropuna volcano and was active during the last 43,000 years.

During the last glacial maximum, glaciers formed on Pichu Pichu and descended to 4,200 metres (13,800 ft) elevation. This glaciation has left recognizable traces on the mountains including cirques, glacial troughs, hanging valleys, moraines and mudflows. Moraines occur at elevations of 4,500 metres (14,800 ft). Below the moraines are outwash plains. A series of hills at the base of Pichu Pichu may be erosion products of moraines or moraines proper associated with the volcano. In 1963, there was still permanent ice on Pichu Pichu. Since then, ice has retreated due to global warming and the mountain has lost its glaciers. Presently, frost shattering takes place, caused by the large day-night temperature differences, and there are rock glaciers within cirques.

== Climate, vegetation and hydrology ==
The climate of the region is relatively dry, with most precipitation falling during the summer months when the monsoon brings moisture from the Amazon. At the higher elevations of Pichu Pichu precipitation is greater than the lowlands, reaching 400–600 millimetres (16–24 in) per year and rapidly declining southwestward although reportedly on Pichu Pichu and Misti precipitation mostly falls on the southwestern side. The summit has a polar climate, and an ephemeral snow cover forms on the mountain during summer. There are several vegetation belts on the mountain. Between 3,000–3,700 metres (10,000–12,000 ft), there are various shrubs. Polylepis rugulosa forests grow at 3,700–4,000 metres (12,100–13,100 ft) elevation, where they cover an area of about 40 square kilometres (15 sq mi) to 50 square kilometres (19 sq mi). The rest of the mountain is covered with tundra. Typical plant species are tola, ichu grass and yareta. Animals include Altiplano chinchilla mice, ashy chinchilla rats, birds, cougars, culpeos, Jelski's altiplano mice, lesser grisons, Lima leaf-eared mice, lizards, master leaf-eared mice, Molina's hog-nosed skunks, Northern viscachas, Pampas cats, Peruvian slender snake, Puno grass mice, small big-eared brown bats, tarucas, white-bellied fat-tailed mouse opossums and yellow-rumped leaf-eared mice. At lower elevations there are spectacular agricultural terraces. Parts of the volcano are within the Salinas y Aguada Blanca National Reserve.

The western flank drains into the Andamayo and Mollebaya rivers, and the southwestern into Yarabamba River (a tributary of the Mollebaya). The Andamayo and Mollebaya eventually join to form the Vitor and Siguas river and flow to the Pacific Ocean. On the eastern flank, waters flow into the Laguna Salinas closed basin. Dry valleys run down the slopes of Pichu Pichu. The mountain is an important source of water, as water from springs east of Arequipa originates on it. Rainwater easily penetrates the heavily fractured rocks and re-emerges as bicarbonate-rich water in springs. The waters are used for irrigation, and there have been discussions about damming rivers.

== Archeology and religious importance ==
A partially collapsed ceremonial platform constructed by the Incas sits between the two highest points of Pichu Pichu, in a place more suitable for construction than the actual peak. The Incas built a zig-zagging trail on to the mountain, which on the northeastern flank includes a staircase cut into rocks that crosses a steep slope at over 5,300 metres (17,400 ft) above sea level. There are two tambos (waystations) on Pichu Pichu, one is at 4,600 metres (15,100 ft) elevation on the northeastern foot, along with a ceremonial platform covered by ash from Huaynaputina's 1600 eruption. The buildings of the tambo have different sizes, perhaps implying social differentiation. The existence of petroglyphs (perhaps Inca geometric motifs) was only recently proven. The Tiahuanaco built hilltop sites around the mountain. The discovery of the archaeological sites in 1958 by Japanese alpinists drew the attention of media in Japan and Arequipa, which claimed the discovery of a lost city, with Pichu-Pichu occasionally being confused for Coropuna. Initial expeditions did not find archaeological evidence, and the existence of the sites was debated in the regional media. The 1996 expedition later became subject of a film by Discovery TV, Andes: Life in the Sky.

A mummy was found in 1964 or 1963 under the summit platform, and two more in 1996. They were probably two females (one 15 and the other 10 years old) and one 8-year old male; one source mentions a 3.5-year old male. The cranium of one of them had been deformed. Various grave goods, including borax, pottery, a textile with rings of silver, and anthropomorphic and animal-like statues were recovered from Pichu Pichu. The mummies were capacochas, Inca human sacrifices, and had received blows to the head before burial; they may have resisted being sacrificed. After death, they were wrapped in bundles, laid between the walls and gravel piled up, until a platform had formed. The girls were probably acllas, maidens that had been picked at a young age to become servants to the gods. They were presumably offered to placate the mid-15th century volcanic eruption of neighbouring Misti. The mummies had first been discovered in the course of grave robbing, and scientific findings were initially not published out of fear that they would draw more robbers.

Together with Chachani and Misti, Pichu Pichu was viewed as the protector of Arequipa. It was an apu, a kind of divinity in Andean culture linked to mountains that receives offerings. It is described as having a helpful personality. In other myths Pichu Pichu is the Arequipean seat of the Inkca creation deity Roal. Ancient states such as the Wari empire thus established control over the mountains; Pichu Pichu is visible from the important Wari site Cerro Baul, and its highest summit is recognizable from the Churajón site. To this day, the mountain is viewed as a protective spirit and venerated. Supposedly, it prefers expensive drinks.
