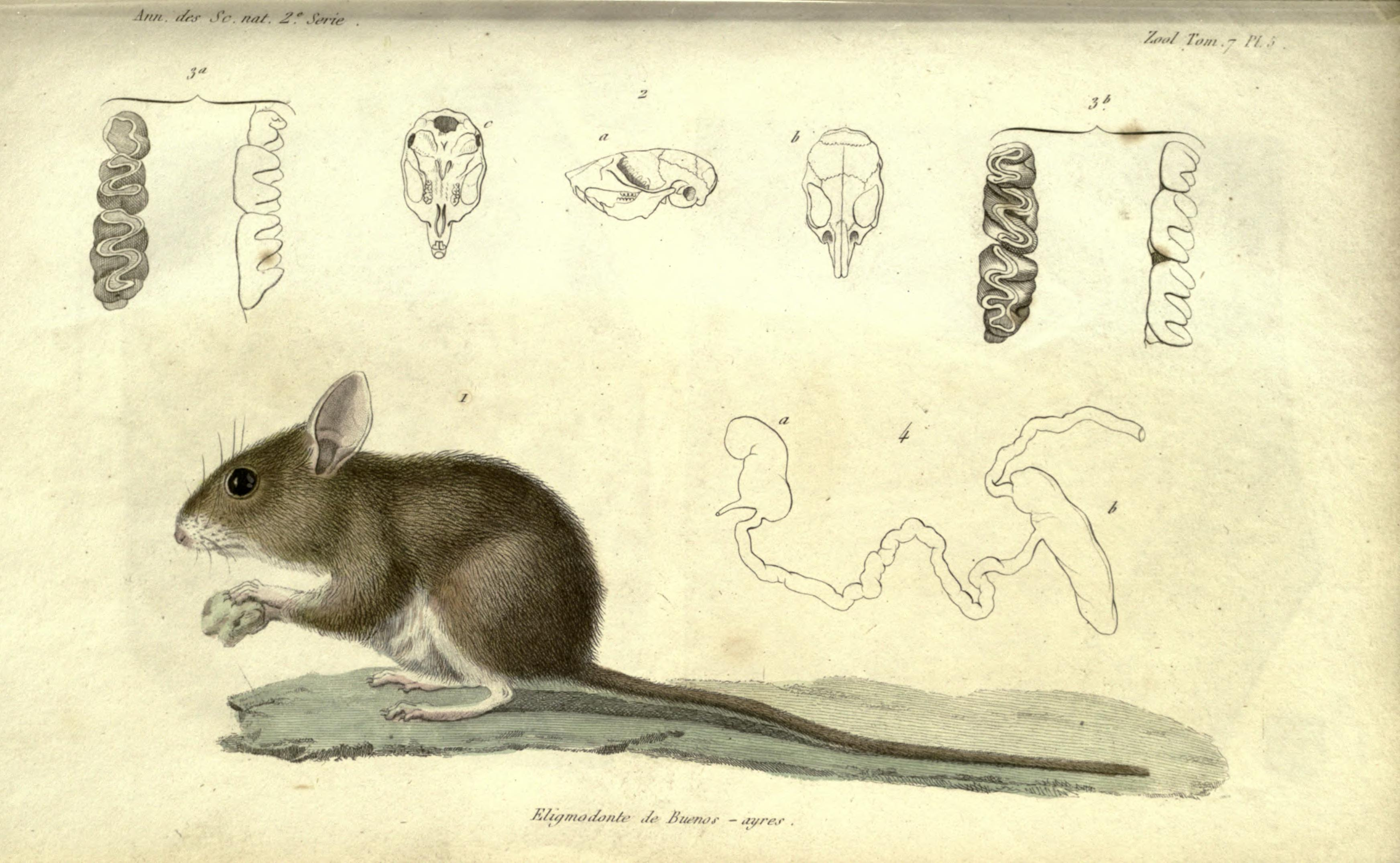

Scientific classification
- Kingdom: Animalia
- Phylum: Chordata
- Class: Mammalia
- Order: Rodentia
- Family: Cricetidae
- Subfamily: Sigmodontinae
- Tribe: Phyllotini
- Genus: Eligmodontia; Cuvier, 1837

Type species
- Eligmodontia typus

Species
- Eligmodontia hirtipes Eligmodontia moreni Eligmodontia morgani Eligmodontia puerulus Eligmodontia typus and see text

= Eligmodontia =

Gerbil mice Temporal range: Late Pleistocene to Recent

Genus of rodents

The genus Eligmodontia consists of five or six species of South American sigmodontine mice restricted to Bolivia, Chile, and Argentina. Species of Eligmodontia occur along the eastern side of the Andes Mountains, in Patagonia, and in the Chaco thorn forest of South America. They can be found in arid and semiarid habitats and in both high and low elevation areas. These rodents are commonly known as gerbil mice or by their local name lauchas. Sometimes they are also called silky desert mice, highland desert mice or silky-footed mice. The closest living relatives are probably the chaco mice (Andalgalomys), the leaf-eared mice (Graomys, Paralomys and Phyllotis), and Salinomys.

== Taxonomy, systematics and evolution ==
The genus receives its name from the occlusal (chewing surface) pattern of the molars and is derived from the Ancient Greek eliktos (ἑλικτός, "winding") and odontas (ὀδόντας, "toothed").

The systematics and taxonomy of Eligmodontia have been complicated. The first specimen was acquired by Charles Darwin in 1835 at Bahía Blanca (Argentina), during his five-year journey on HMS Beagle. It was formally described by George R. Waterhouse as Mus elegans in February 1837, just weeks after the formal description of E. typus by Frédéric Cuvier, from a specimen that he had received from Buenos Aires and which was collected six months after Darwin's. The two taxa were later synonymized and represent the same species.

=== Systematics ===
Eligmodontia belongs to the subfamily Sigmodontinae and the tribe Phyllotini. Eight species of Eligmodontia have been described, three of these containing two subspecies each. In a 1962 revision of the tribe Phyllotini, Philip Hershkovitz synonymized all 10 named forms of Eligmodontia known by then into a single species with two subspecies. The lighter and larger northern populations were known as Eligmodontia typus puerulus, and the darker and smaller southern ones as E. typus typus. For nearly 30 years, Hershkovitz's approach was followed until karyotypes and molecular data became available. Today, five distinct karyotypes have been described, and as many distinct clades have been found.

The following 5 species can be unequivocally recognized:

- Monte Gerbil Mouse or Monte Laucha, Eligmodontia moreni
- Andean Gerbil Mouse or Altiplano Laucha, Eligmodontia puerulus
- Eligmodontia hirtipes (Thomas, 1902) (recently separated from E. puerulus)
- Morgan's Gerbil Mouse or Western Patagonian Laucha, Eligmodontia morgani
- Eastern Patagonian Laucha, Eligmodontia typus
- Highland Gerbil Mouse, Eligmodontia bolsonensis Mares, Braun, Coyner & van den Bussche, 2008

The case of the newly proposed species E. bolsonensis is quite interesting. Phylogenetically it is part of the same clade as E. typus. Yet there seems to have been reproductive isolation between these two parapatric populations – the population separated as bolsonensis occurs where the range of E. typus extends northwards and upslope into the Andes. And while splitting E. bolsonensis from E. typus would leave the latter non-monophyletic as regards because of incomplete lineage sorting, the two differ weakly but consistently in several molecular and morphological characters.

Altogether, this seems to represent a case of ongoing parapatric speciation, with a population of E. typus becoming separated at the northern and upper limit of its range not more than a few 100,000 years ago. Whether they are to be treated as species or subspecies is essentially a matter of what species concept one prefers. Additionally, it appears that the karyotype reported for E. typus originates from the upland population, and that the karyotype of E. typus proper is unknown.

=== Evolution ===
A crude molecular clock – uncalibrated due to the absence of fossil Eligmodontia – has been applied to this genus. However, it agrees well with the emergence of key geographical features in the region. The data suggests that the genus evolved approximately in the mid-late Miocene (Serravallian–Tortonian), about 13-7 mya (million years ago). Presumably, the original Eligmodontia occurred in the region now inhabited by E. typus. Increasing aridity as a consequence of the beginning Quaternary glaciation combined with the uplift of the Patagonian Andes during the latter Pliocene (late Piacenzian to Gelasian, about 3–1.7 mya) split the population into a lowland and a montane lineage. The latter expanded southwards in the Gelasian, these populations becoming increasingly isolated and eventually became the E. morgani of our time. The same happened somewhat later, at the beginning of the Early Pleistocene (about 2–1.5 mya) at the northern end of the genus' range, with the separating Altiplano population becoming the ancestors of E. hirtipes. Finally, in the Middle Pleistocene local uplifts in the Pampean region separated the ancestors of E. moreni and E. puerulus, and the lowlands population, isolated form its relatives since more than one million years, began also expanding into the uplands, yielding E. (t.) bolsonensis which currently well on its way to become another highly distinct species.
