= Puna mouse =

Conservation status
- Vulnerable (IUCN 3.1)

Scientific classification
- Kingdom: Animalia
- Phylum: Chordata
- Class: Mammalia
- Order: Rodentia
- Family: Cricetidae
- Subfamily: Sigmodontinae
- Genus: Punomys
- Species: P. lemminus

Binomial name
- Punomys lemminus Osgood, 1943

Species of rodent

The puna mouse (Punomys lemminus) is a species of rodent in the family Cricetidae.

== Taxonomy ==
Punomys lenninus was first described, along with the genus Punomys, by Wilfred H. Osgood in 1943, based on specimens collected by Colin C. Sanborn in 1939. The specimen was originally though to be related to Galenomys garleppi, which was known from only a single specimen, but a new example of G. garleppi showed that they were clearly different. The taxon Punomys was monotypic until the addition of P. kofordi in 1995.

== Habitat and ecology ==
The puna mouse is found in southern Peru and northern Chile, where it lives in puna habitat at elevations of at least 4,400 metres (14,400 ft) in the Cordillera Occidental mountain range. One specimen, which may have been either Punomys lemminus, P. kofordi, or a new species was found in La Paz, Bolivia in 1987, and identified with the genus by Salazar-Bravo et al in 2011. The highest altitude record for the species, in the caldera of Acamarachi, Antofagasta, Chile, was provisionally assigned to P. lemminus, but may also have been its sister species P. kofordi. This range extension would make it the mammal species with the second-highest elevation range, after the Punta de Vacas leaf-eared mouse, also found in the mountains in Chile. It also suggests that the species can likely be found continuously in the Cordillera mountains between the type locality in Peru and this location, extending its likely range to Bolivia and possibly Argentina.

It lives in rocky areas near water. It has been observed to feed primarily on Senecio adenophylloides and Werneria digitata plants, which it stores twigs of under rocks.

== Description and conservation status ==
The puna mouse is a medium-sized, stout mouse with long yellow-gray fur, a short tail, and small ears. It has a short relative tail length than its sister species P. kofordi, with a smaller skull. Osgood described the teeth as "highly peculiar". The two species may have separated due to expanding glacial coverage during the Pleistocene, which would have physically separated the populations.

Due to its high mountain habit, which is at risk from climate change, the species is listed as vulnerable by the IUCN despite a lack of population estimates.
