= Eastern puna mouse =

Conservation status
- Near Threatened (IUCN 3.1)

Scientific classification
- Kingdom: Animalia
- Phylum: Chordata
- Class: Mammalia
- Order: Rodentia
- Family: Cricetidae
- Subfamily: Sigmodontinae
- Genus: Punomys
- Species: P. kofordi

Binomial name
- Punomys kofordi Pacheco & Patton, 1995

Species of rodent

The Eastern puna mouse (Punomys kofordi) is a species of rodent in the family Cricetidae.

== Taxonomy ==
Punomys kofordi was described in 1995 by V. Pacheco and J. L. Patton, based on specimens collected in 1951 and 1970 by Carl B. Koford, after whom the species is named. It is the second member of the previously monotypic genus Punomys.

== Description ==
The Eastern puna mouse is a large, stout mouse with long dark-brown fur on the top of the body and gray fur on the bottom of the body. Adults are approximately 203 millimetres (8.0 in) long. It has a longer relative tail length and shorter hind limbs than its sister species P. lemminus, with a smaller skull. It is overall darker than P. lemminus. The two species may have separated due to expanding glacial coverage during the Pleistocene, which would have physically separated the populations.

The Eastern puna mouse is endemic to southern Peru. One specimen, which may have been either Punomys kofordi, P. lemminus, or a new species was found in La Paz, Bolivia in 1987, and identified with the genus by Salazar-Bravo et al in 2011. Aside from that, no specimens have been collected since 1970. Within Peru, it is found in moist areas within puna grassland at elevations of 4,500 metres (14,800 ft) to 4,800 metres (15,700 ft) in the Kallawaya mountain range, a section of the Cordillera Oriental. This is provisionally the third-highest known range of any species of mammal, after the Punta de Vacas leaf-eared mouse and P. lemminus. One specimen, found in 2023, extended the range of Punomys to 5,461 metres (17,917 ft). It was provisionally assigned to P. lemminus, but the authors were not certain of its identification between that and P. kofordi; if it were re-identified as P. kofordi, then it would have the second-highest known range instead of P. lemminus.

The Eastern puna mouse's habitat is differentiated from P. lemminus by higher annual rainfall. They were often found near Senecio bushes. Several Eastern puna mice may share a burrow. While there is limited data, they likely breed during the summer wet season, with litters of two to three.
