= Anita's leaf-eared mouse =

Conservation status
- Data Deficient (IUCN 3.1)

Scientific classification
- Kingdom: Animalia
- Phylum: Chordata
- Class: Mammalia
- Order: Rodentia
- Family: Cricetidae
- Subfamily: Sigmodontinae
- Genus: Phyllotis
- Species: P. anitae

Binomial name
- Phyllotis anitae Jayat, D'Elia, Pardiñas & Namen, 2007

Species of rodent

Anita's leaf-eared mouse (Phyllotis anitae) is a species of rodent in the family Cricetidae. It was discovered in Tucumán Province in northwestern Argentina in alder forest of the upper part of the Southern Andean Yungas ecoregion, on the eastern slopes of the Andes. The species is terrestrial and nocturnal, and was named after American zoologist Anita K. Pearson (wife of zoologist Oliver P. Pearson, 1915-2003). It appears to be most closely related to the bunchgrass leaf-eared mouse.
