= Smeat =

Smeat or SMEAT may refer to:

- Spam (food) and other types of canned meats
- Skylab Medical Experiment Altitude Test
