= Morgan's gerbil mouse =

Conservation status
- Least Concern (IUCN 3.1)

Scientific classification
- Kingdom: Animalia
- Phylum: Chordata
- Class: Mammalia
- Order: Rodentia
- Family: Cricetidae
- Subfamily: Sigmodontinae
- Genus: Eligmodontia
- Species: E. morgani

Binomial name
- Eligmodontia morgani Allen, 1901

Species of rodent

Morgan's gerbil mouse (Eligmodontia morgani), also known as the western Patagonian laucha, is a South American species of rodent in the family Cricetidae. It is named after J. P. Morgan, one of the sponsors of the expedition that first identified the species.

== Description ==
Morgan's gerbil mouse is a slender, mouse-like rodent with large ears and elongated hind feet. Adults measure from 15 to 20 cm (5.9 to 7.9 in) in total length, including a tail about 8 cm (3.1 in) long, and weigh from 10 to 31 g (0.35 to 1.09 oz). Females are slightly larger than males. The fur is long and silky, and is a dull brownish-grey over the upper body, and pure white on the underside; a distinct line of yellowish fur runs along the animal's sides separating the brown from the white fur. The tail is hairy, and darker coloured above than below. Unlike most other species in the genus, the hind feet have a thick coat of fur on the soles.

== Distribution and habitat ==
Morgan's gerbil mouse is found in southern Argentina, from southern Mendoza Province and Neuquén and Río Negro provinces in the north to the Strait of Magellan in the south. They are also found in the Magallanes and Tierra del Fuego Provinces of Chile. Within this region they are most common in open sandy grasslands and steppe, at elevations between sea level and 1,280 m (4,200 ft). There are no recognised subspecies.

== Biology and behaviour ==
Morgan's gerbil mouse is primarily herbivorous, feeding on the seeds of shrubs such as Berberis, Acaena and Lycium, although they will also eat a small number of insects. They are nocturnal, and construct nests by cutting holes into the bases of tussocks of grass, but do not use these nests to cache food. They are frequent prey for owls and other local predators, and are said to flee from attack by zigzagging with a gait that is part running and part leaping.

The breeding season lasts from October to April in much of the range, but is shorter in more southerly, colder, climes. The litters of three to nine young reach sexual maturity at six to eight weeks of age. Individuals rarely live for more than nine months.
