= Andean gerbil mouse =

Conservation status
- Least Concern (IUCN 3.1)

Scientific classification
- Kingdom: Animalia
- Phylum: Chordata
- Class: Mammalia
- Order: Rodentia
- Family: Cricetidae
- Subfamily: Sigmodontinae
- Genus: Eligmodontia
- Species: E. puerulus

Binomial name
- Eligmodontia puerulus (Philippi, 1896)

Species of rodent

The Andean gerbil mouse or Altiplano laucha (Eligmodontia puerulus) is a species of rodent in the family Cricetidae. It is found in Argentina, Bolivia, Chile, and Peru.
