= Eligmodontia typus =

Conservation status
- Least Concern (IUCN 3.1)

Scientific classification
- Kingdom: Animalia
- Phylum: Chordata
- Class: Mammalia
- Order: Rodentia
- Family: Cricetidae
- Subfamily: Sigmodontinae
- Genus: Eligmodontia
- Species: E. typus

Binomial name
- Eligmodontia typus F. Cuvier, 1837
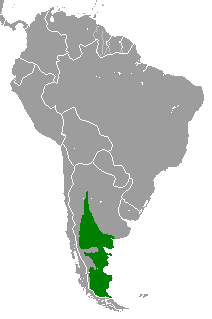
- Eligmodontia typus range map

Species of rodent

Eligmodontia typus is a species of rodent in the family Cricetidae. It is found in Argentina and possibly also Chile. The northernmost population might represent a distinct species, E. bolsonensis, to which the common name highland gerbil mouse would apply. The lowland population would then be known as eastern Patagonian gerbil mouse or eastern Patagonian laucha.
