= Punomys =

Scientific classification
- Domain: Eukaryota
- Kingdom: Animalia
- Phylum: Chordata
- Class: Mammalia
- Order: Rodentia
- Family: Cricetidae
- Subfamily: Sigmodontinae
- Tribe: Phyllotini
- Genus: Punomys; Osgood, 1943

Type species
- Punomys lemminus

Species
- Punomys kofordi Punomys lemminus

Genus of rodents

Punomys is a genus of rodents in the family Cricetidae. It contains the following species:

- Eastern puna mouse (Punomys kofordi)
- Puna mouse (Punomys lemminus)
