= Chiguata District =

Coordinates: 16°24′S 71°24′W

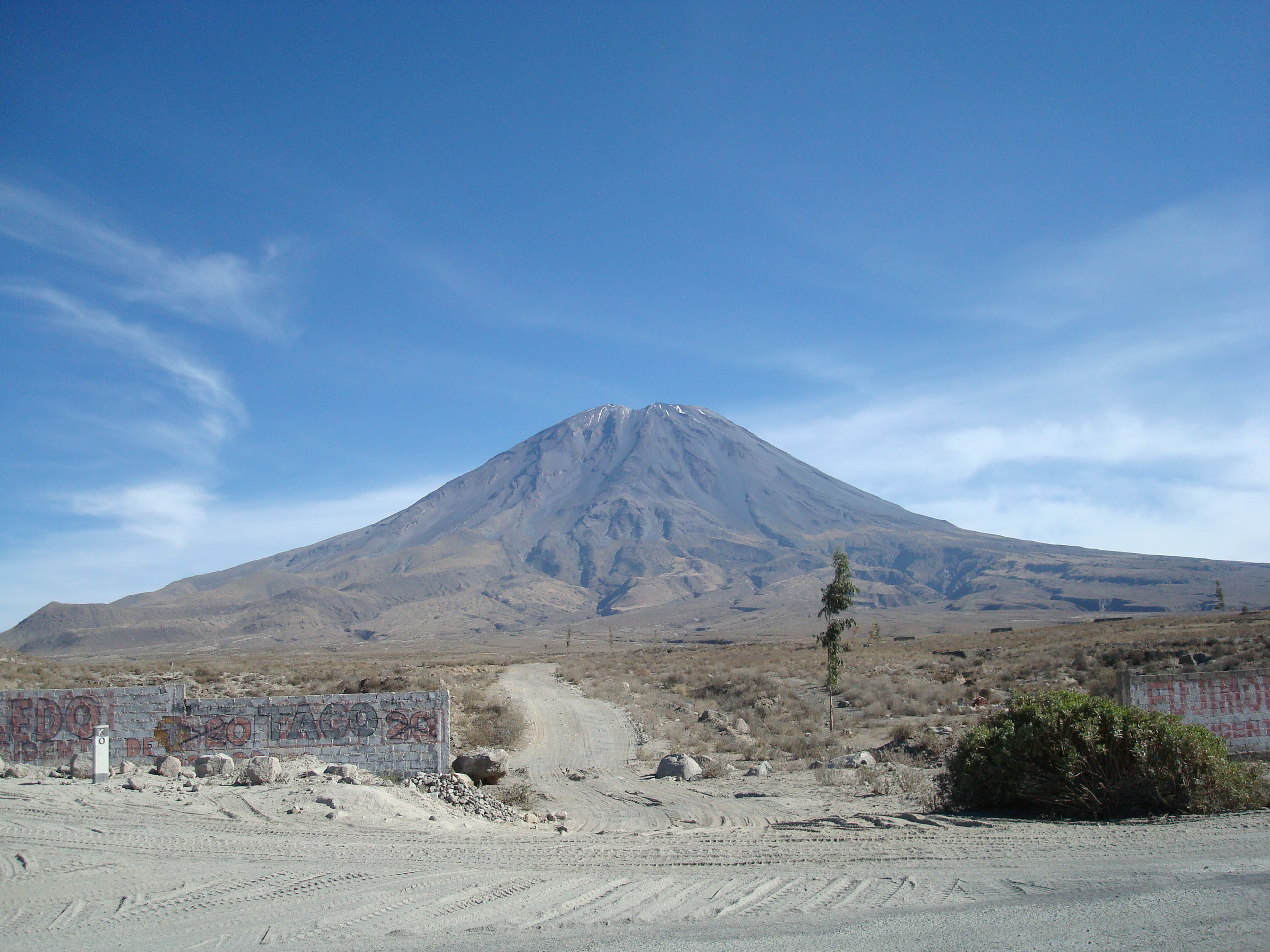

Chiguata is a district located in the Arequipa province, 30 km away from the city of Arequipa, Peru, on the slopes of the volcano Pikchu Pikchu (where at its summit pre-Inca worshipped remains and artifacts have been found). The name chiguata comes from the Quechua words "chiri" meaning "cold" and "wata" meaning "year" (cold all year). Ancient Chiguata was inhabited by the local natives until the arrival of Spanish influence in charge of the emissary Diego Hernández de Córdova in 1540. Soon after, the construction of a small plaza was initiated, and according to the Dominican religious order and local sources, the plaza's Templo del Espíritu Santo ("Holy Spirit temple") along with its domes and lateral cover was not begun until 1739. The design of the temple is quite interesting, with two angels in feathered nightwear and their arms lifted vertically, separated by twelve fringes of rectangular flowers which add to the whole decoration of the temple. Cherubs also decorate the circular cornice, along with four saints in full-length reliefs that occupy the "pechinas" of the columns that sustain the temple's dome, which is considered one of the most original works of the colony and now visited by occasional tourists.

What remains of the population of Chiguata and the villages around is a small group of natives, as the mestizo people born in the previous generations have moved away, principally to the city of Arequipa, returning occasionally for camping activities or to visit the old plaza and temple during holidays. Chiguata celebrated its 465th anniversary on January 23, 2005.

== See also ==
- Arequipa
- Peru
