= Buenos Aires leaf-eared mouse =

Conservation status
- Near Threatened (IUCN 3.1)

Scientific classification
- Kingdom: Animalia
- Phylum: Chordata
- Class: Mammalia
- Order: Rodentia
- Family: Cricetidae
- Subfamily: Sigmodontinae
- Genus: Phyllotis
- Species: P. bonariensis

Binomial name
- Phyllotis bonariensis Crespo, 1964

Species of rodent

The Buenos Aires leaf-eared mouse (Phyllotis bonariensis) is a species of rodent in the family Cricetidae. It is found only in Argentina.
