= Osgood's leaf-eared mouse =

Conservation status
- Data Deficient (IUCN 3.1)

Scientific classification
- Kingdom: Animalia
- Phylum: Chordata
- Class: Mammalia
- Order: Rodentia
- Family: Cricetidae
- Subfamily: Sigmodontinae
- Genus: Phyllotis
- Species: P. osgoodi

Binomial name
- Phyllotis osgoodi Mann, 1945

Species of rodent

Osgood's leaf-eared mouse (Phyllotis osgoodi) is a species of rodent in the family Cricetidae. It is found only in the Altiplano of northeastern Chile. The species is named after American zoologist Wilfred Hudson Osgood.
