= Los Alisos leaf-eared mouse =

Conservation status
- Data Deficient (IUCN 3.1)

Scientific classification
- Kingdom: Animalia
- Phylum: Chordata
- Class: Mammalia
- Order: Rodentia
- Family: Cricetidae
- Subfamily: Sigmodontinae
- Genus: Phyllotis
- Species: P. alisosiensis

Binomial name
- Phyllotis alisosiensis Ferro, Martínez & Barquez, 2010

Species of rodent

The Los Alisos leaf-eared mouse (Phyllotis alisosiensis) is a species of rodents in the family Cricetidae. It is found in Argentina.
