= Definitive leaf-eared mouse =

Conservation status
- Endangered (IUCN 3.1)

Scientific classification
- Kingdom: Animalia
- Phylum: Chordata
- Class: Mammalia
- Order: Rodentia
- Family: Cricetidae
- Subfamily: Sigmodontinae
- Genus: Phyllotis
- Species: P. definitus

Binomial name
- Phyllotis definitus Osgood, 1915

Species of rodent

The definitive leaf-eared mouse (Phyllotis definitus) is a species of rodent in the family Cricetidae. It is found only in west central Peru, in rocky and shrub-covered areas at elevations between 2600 and 3000 m.
