= Monte gerbil mouse =

Conservation status
- Least Concern (IUCN 3.1)

Scientific classification
- Domain: Eukaryota
- Kingdom: Animalia
- Phylum: Chordata
- Class: Mammalia
- Order: Rodentia
- Family: Cricetidae
- Subfamily: Sigmodontinae
- Genus: Eligmodontia
- Species: E. moreni

Binomial name
- Eligmodontia moreni (Thomas, 1896)

Species of rodent

The Monte gerbil mouse or Monte laucha (Eligmodontia moreni) is a species of rodent in the family Cricetidae. It is found only in Argentina.
