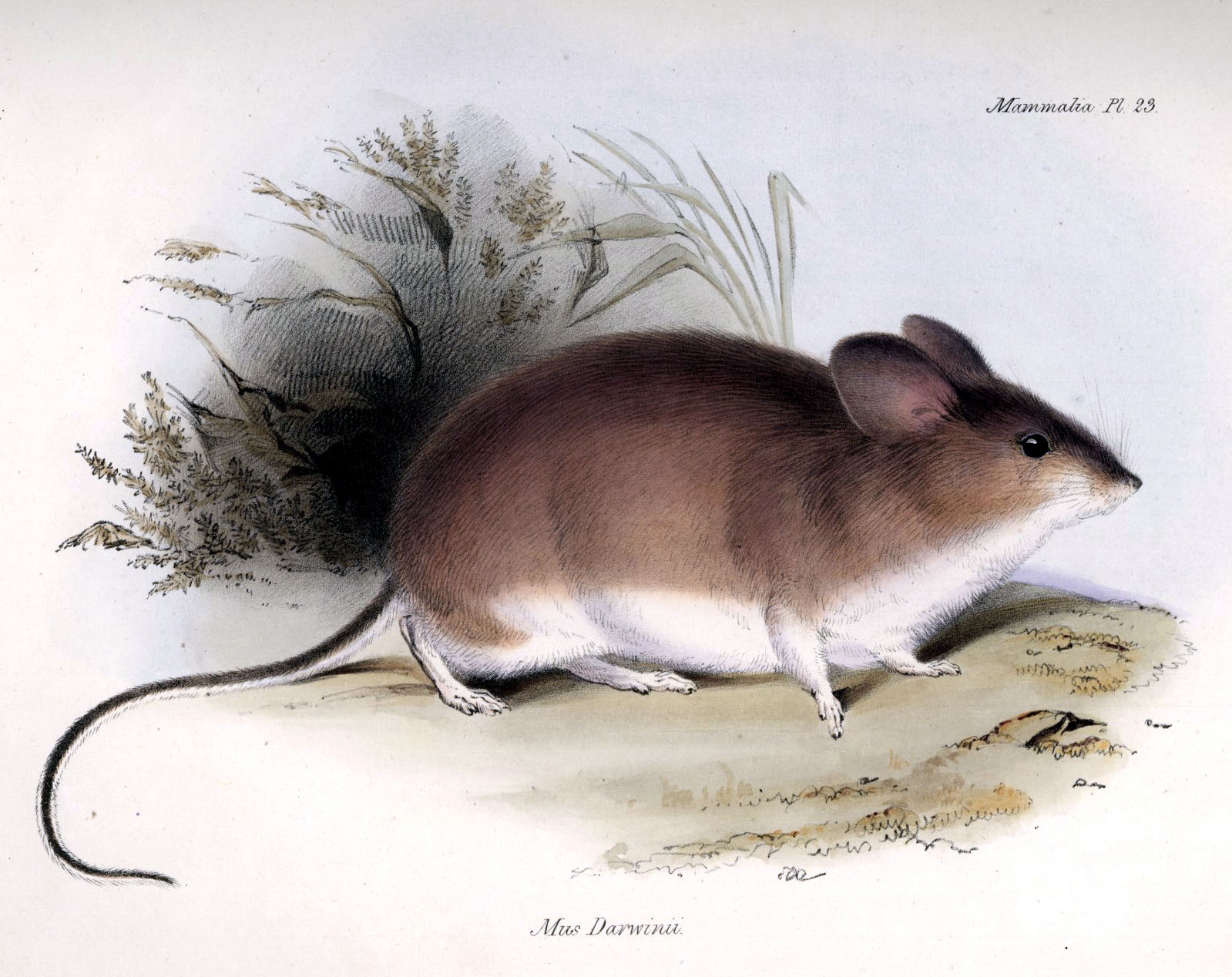

Conservation status
- Least Concern (IUCN 3.1)

Scientific classification
- Kingdom: Animalia
- Phylum: Chordata
- Class: Mammalia
- Order: Rodentia
- Family: Cricetidae
- Subfamily: Sigmodontinae
- Genus: Phyllotis
- Species: P. darwini

Binomial name
- Phyllotis darwini (Waterhouse, 1837)

= Darwin's leaf-eared mouse =

Species of rodent

Darwin's leaf-eared mouse (Phyllotis darwini) is a species of rodent in the family Cricetidae.

It has terrestrial habits and is endemic to coastal central and northern Chile. It is also found in the Atacama Desert. Members of the species have been found in the Llanos de Challe National Park of the Atacama Desert. As a nocturnal rodent, P. darwini utilizes the varying degrees of moonlight to determine predation risk and will often alter foraging habits in favor of avoiding predators.
