= Fauna of the Andes =

Overview of wildlife

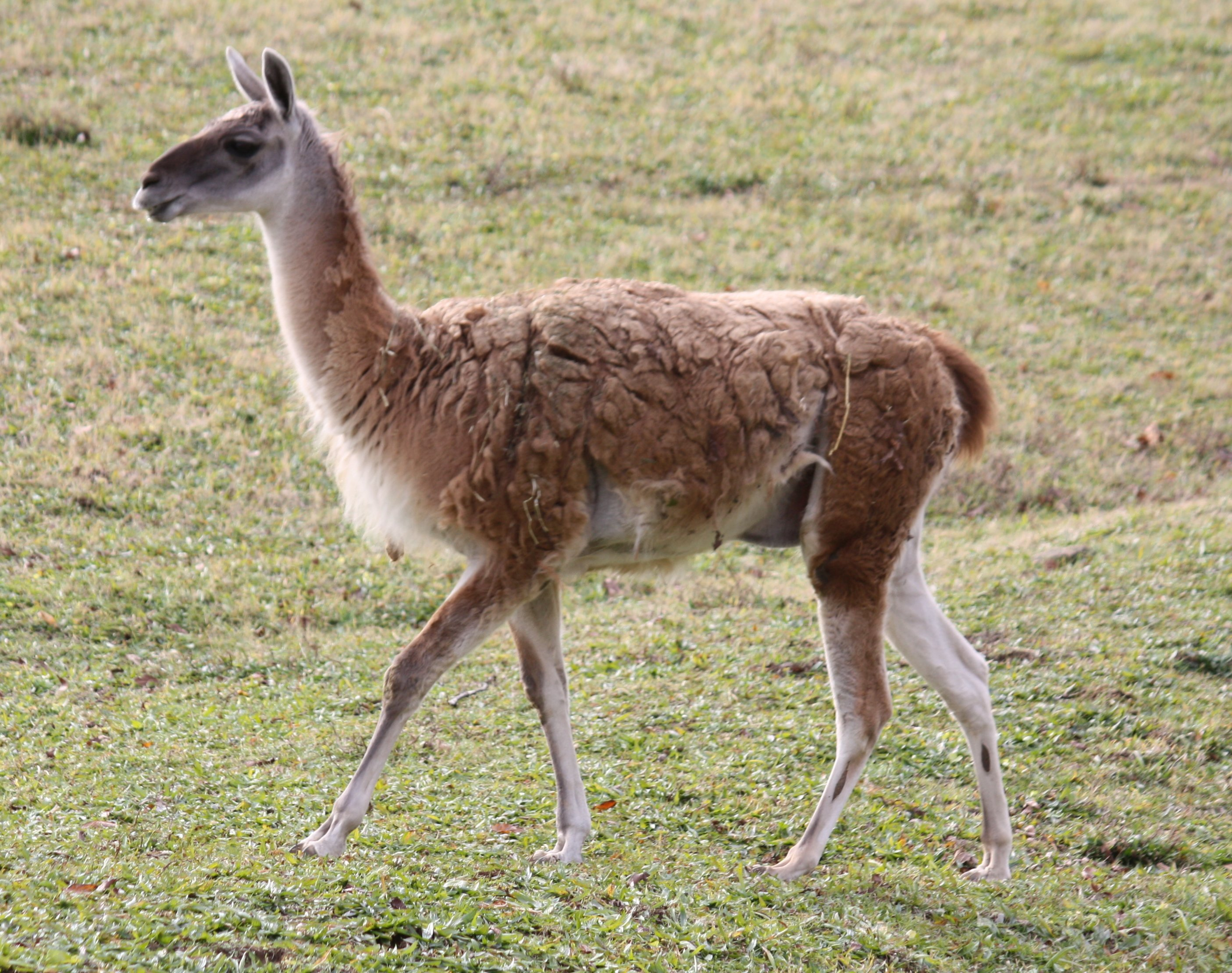
The wild guanaco is a close relative of the domestic llama

The fauna of the Andes, a mountain range in South America, is large and diverse. As well as a huge variety of flora, the Andes contain many different animal species.

With almost 1,000 species, of which roughly 2/3 are endemic to the region, the Andes are the most important region in the world for amphibians. The diversity of animals in the Andes is high, with almost 600 species of mammals (13% endemic), more than 1,700 species of birds (about 1/3 endemic), more than 600 species of reptiles (about 45% endemic), and almost 400 species of fish (about 1/3 endemic).

== Amphibians ==
The Tropical Andes host exceptional amphibian diversity and endemism concentrated in cloud forests, humid slopes and high-elevation wetlands. The region is remarkable for its evolutionary radiations and life-history diversity. Direct-developing frogs such as Pristimantis and Oreobates dominate many montane forests, having evolved to reproduce on land without a tadpole stage. Marsupial frogs (Gastrotheca) carry eggs in a dorsal pouch, and harlequin toads (Atelopus) are vividly coloured stream dwellers that have suffered severe declines from disease. Some species, including high-Andean Telmatobius and Pleurodema, live at altitudes above 5,000 m, showing the extreme environmental limits amphibians can tolerate. These patterns highlight the Andes as both a centre of amphibian evolution and a hotspot of conservation concern due to habitat loss, climate change and chytrid fungus outbreaks.

== Mammals ==
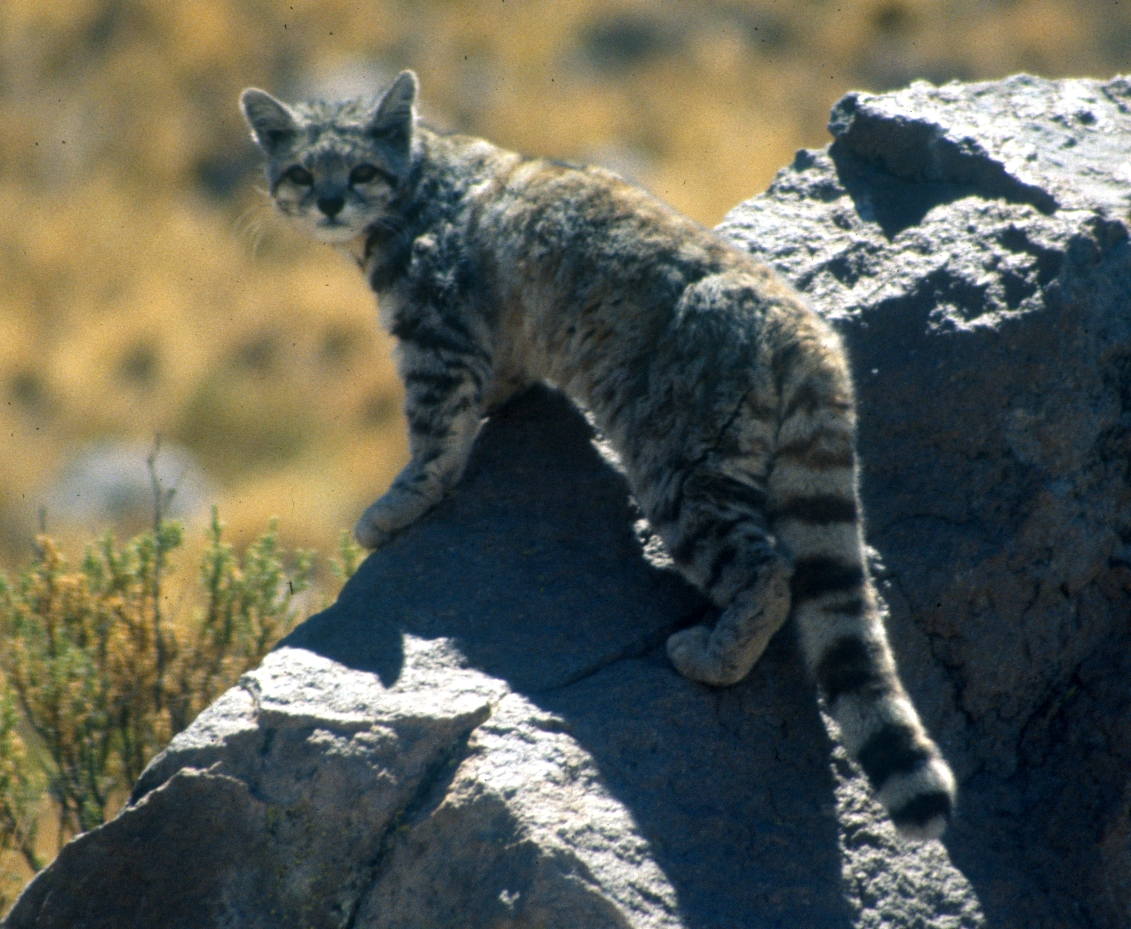
The Andean cat is rarely seen and generally not well-known

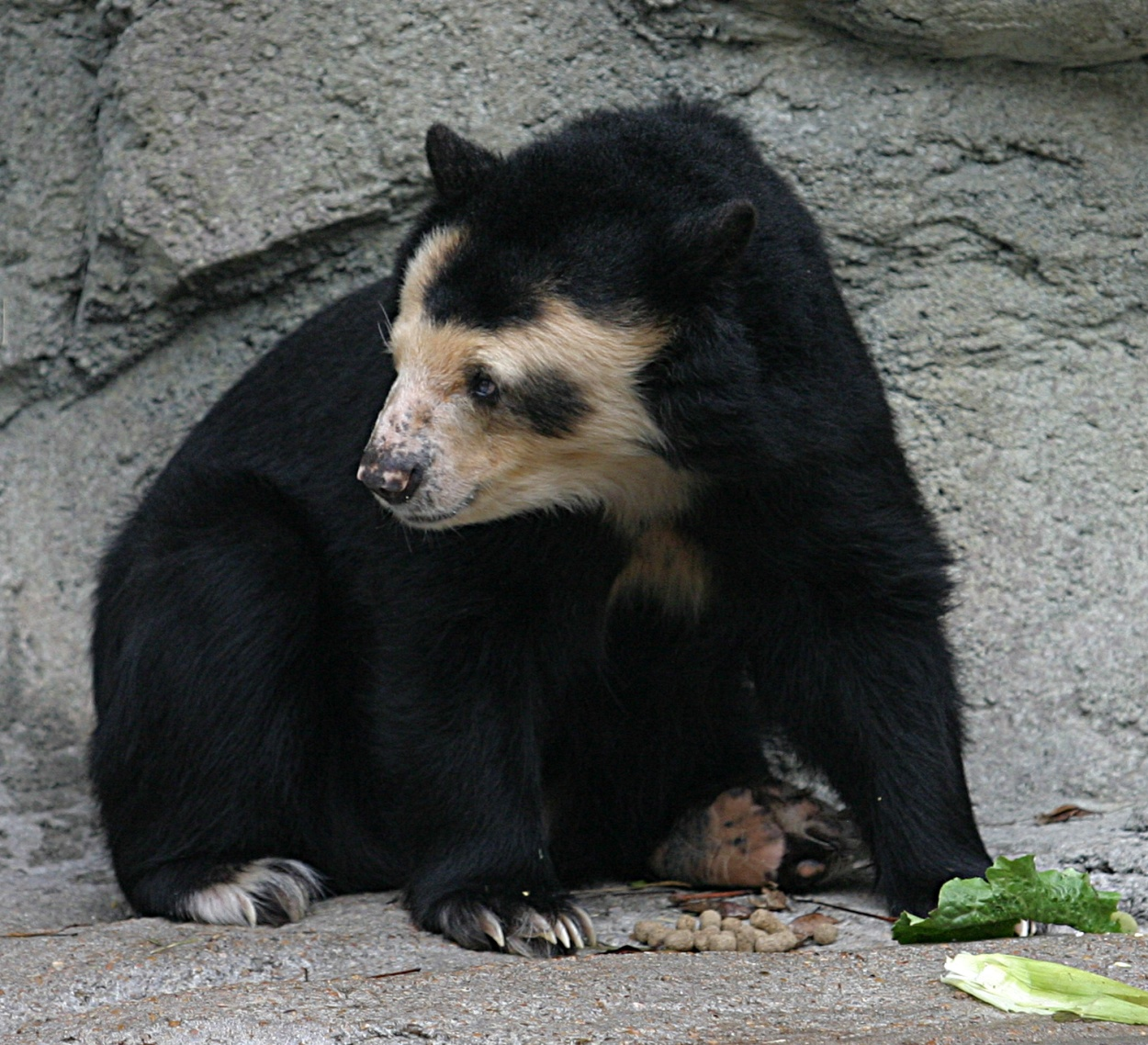
The spectacled bear is the only South American bear

The vicuña and guanaco can be found living in the Altiplano, while the closely related domesticated llama and alpaca are widely kept by locals as pack animals and for their meat and wool. Cougars are also found in the region and play an important role in many Andean cultures together with the llama. The nocturnal chinchillas, two threatened species of the rodent order, inhabits the Andes' alpine regions, but are well known in captivity. Another domestic that originates from the Andean region is the guinea pig. Other wild mammals found in the relatively open habitats of the high Andes include the huemul deer and foxes in the genus Pseudalopex.

Although very rich in flora and fauna, few large mammals are found in the Andean cloud forests, including the Yungas and parts of the Chocó, exceptions being the threatened mountain tapir, spectacled bear and yellow-tailed woolly monkey.

== Birds ==
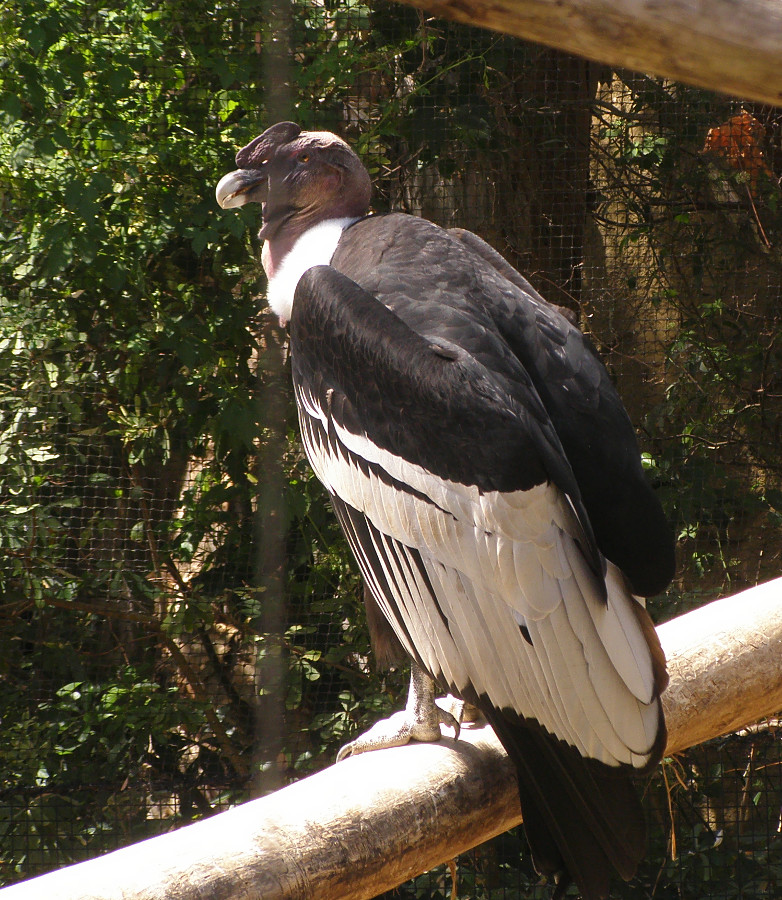
Adult male Andean condor, the largest flying land-bird of the Americas

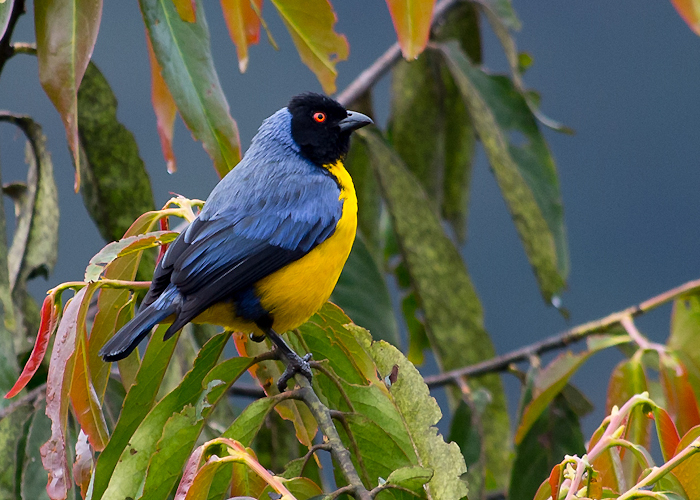
Colourful tanagers (here hooded mountain tanager) are common in Andean forests

The Andean condor, the largest flying land-bird in the Western Hemisphere, occurs throughout much of the Andes but generally in very low densities. Numerous other birds are found in open habitats of the Andes, including certain species of tinamous (notably members of the genus Nothoprocta), Andean goose, torrent duck, giant coot, flamingos, lesser rhea, Andean flicker, diademed sandpiper-plover, miners, sierra-finches and diuca-finches.

A few species of hummingbirds, notably some hillstars, can be seen at altitudes above 4,000 m (13,100 ft), but far higher diversities can be found at lower altitudes, especially in the humid Andean forests ("cloud forests") growing on slopes in Colombia, Ecuador, Peru, Bolivia and far northwestern Argentina. Other birds of humid Andean forests include mountain-toucans, quetzals and the Andean cock-of-the-rock, while mixed species flocks dominated by tanagers and furnariids commonly are seen – in contrast to several vocal but typically cryptic species of wrens, tapaculos and antpittas.

A number of species such as the royal cinclodes and white-browed tit-spinetail are associated with Polylepis woods, and consequently also threatened.

== Aquatic animals ==
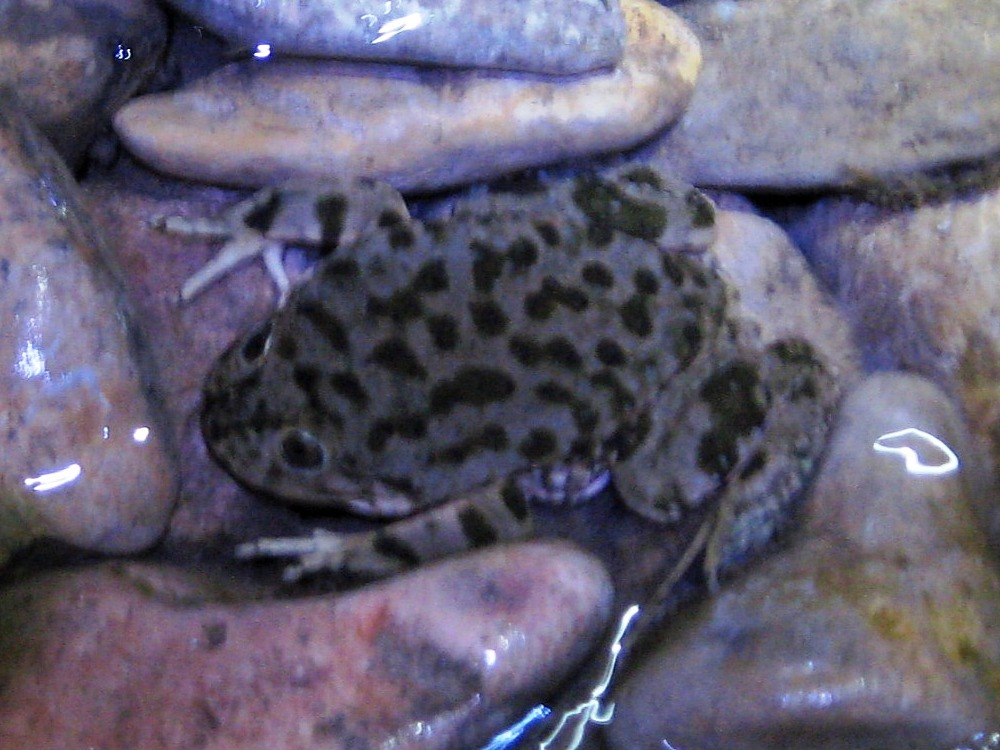
Telmatobius is restricted to the Andes and include many threatened species (pictured: T. marmoratus)

Water birds are diverse, ranging from giant coot, Andean goose and other waterfowl in lakes, torrent duck in fast-flowing rivers, and Andean avocet and flamingos in hypersaline lakes such as Poopó.

Titicaca is the largest Andean lake and Junin is the largest lake fully within Peru. Each host several threatened endemics, including grebes (Titicaca flightless grebe and Junin grebe), giant aquatic frogs (Titicaca water frog and Lake Junin frog) and Orestias fish. Although the foothill and lower mountain rivers and streams are relatively rich in fish, few are found in the highest, which generally are dominated by a few genera of catfish, notably Astroblepus and Trichomycterus. There are few larger Andean crustacean, but the unusual aeglids occur up to 3,500 m (11,500 ft) in Argentina, Bolivia and Chile. In addition to pollution and habitat loss, smaller aquatic natives in the Andes are often threatened by introduced, non-native trout.
