= Gerbil leaf-eared mouse =

Conservation status
- Least Concern (IUCN 3.1)

Scientific classification
- Kingdom: Animalia
- Phylum: Chordata
- Class: Mammalia
- Infraclass: Placentalia
- Order: Rodentia
- Family: Cricetidae
- Subfamily: Sigmodontinae
- Genus: Phyllotis
- Species: P. gerbillus

Binomial name
- Phyllotis gerbillus (Thomas, 1900)

Species of rodent

The gerbil leaf-eared mouse (Phyllotis gerbillus) is a species of rodent in the family Cricetidae. It is found only in Peru.

It has been discovered that P. amicus and P. gerbillius are closely related as sister species. However, P. gerbilllius belongs to the clade Phyllotis, which contains amicus, andium, and gerbellius while wolffsohni belongs to Tapecomys. Measurements of 35 P. gerbillus adults were as follows; total length of 83.2 ± 0.72 (77-96 in ); tail 78.1 ± 1.13 (62–90 in); greatest length of skull, 23.44 ± 0.09 (22.2 - 24.5 in); zygomatic breadth, 12.32 ± 0.04 (11.7 -13.0 in) and weight, 17.37 ± 0.50 (14-25). This data excluded pregnant females.
