= Skylab Medical Experiment Altitude Test =

Ground simulation of space mission

The SMEAT crew emblem

The Skylab Medical Experiment Altitude Test, or SMEAT, was a 56-day simulation of an American Skylab space mission from 26 July-19 September 1972 at NASA's Manned Spacecraft Center in Houston, Texas. The astronauts in the test were Bob Crippen, Karol Bobko, and William Thornton, who simulated space experiments, housekeeping and leisure activities in a hypobaric chamber. SMEAT provided a baseline for the in-orbit portion of biomedical experiments on Skylab.

One of the benefits of SMEAT was discovering flaws in the urine handling system of Skylab, which allowed the problem to be fixed. The Skylab toilet went on to be widely praised by astronauts after the orbital missions.

MSC invited the press in to film the crew entering the chamber. They could not talk to the press as they entered because they were wearing oxygen masks, but they did give a signed photo to one of the press that came out for the event. There were also a number of NASA officials there.

SMEAT's main objective was to evaluate equipment and procedures proposed for use during the Skylab missions. NASA also wanted to obtain a baseline of physiological data for crewmembers confined in a test chamber to compare to the orbiting crews in Skylab living in zero-G. The crew was subjected to a pressure of 1/3 bar and 70% oxygen level. Closed-circuit TV provided views of activities inside the chamber.

Simulation Conditions
1/3 bar pressure
70% oxygen level
56 days duration

Roles:

- Commander - Robert Crippen
- Science Pilot - William Thornton
- Pilot - Karol Bobko

== See also ==
- Timeline of longest spaceflights
- Organisms at high altitude
- List of Mars analogs
- Control (science) (Skylab provided baseline data for in-orbit experiments)
