= Bunchgrass leaf-eared mouse =

Conservation status
- Least Concern (IUCN 3.1)

Scientific classification
- Kingdom: Animalia
- Phylum: Chordata
- Class: Mammalia
- Order: Rodentia
- Family: Cricetidae
- Subfamily: Sigmodontinae
- Genus: Phyllotis
- Species: P. osilae

Binomial name
- Phyllotis osilae J.A. Allen, 1901

Species of rodent

The bunchgrass leaf-eared mouse (Phyllotis osilae) is a species of rodent in the family Cricetidae. It is found in Argentina, Bolivia, and Peru.
