= Friendly leaf-eared mouse =

Conservation status
- Least Concern (IUCN 3.1)

Scientific classification
- Kingdom: Animalia
- Phylum: Chordata
- Class: Mammalia
- Order: Rodentia
- Family: Cricetidae
- Subfamily: Sigmodontinae
- Genus: Phyllotis
- Species: P. amicus

Binomial name
- Phyllotis amicus (Thomas, 1900)

Species of rodent

The friendly leaf-eared mouse (Phyllotis amicus) is a species of rodent in the family Cricetidae. It is found only in Peru.
