= Andean leaf-eared mouse =

Andean Leaf-eared Mouse

Conservation status
- Least Concern (IUCN 3.1)

Scientific classification
- Kingdom: Animalia
- Phylum: Chordata
- Class: Mammalia
- Infraclass: Placentalia
- Order: Rodentia
- Family: Cricetidae
- Subfamily: Sigmodontinae
- Genus: Phyllotis
- Species: P. andium

Binomial name
- Phyllotis andium Thomas, 1912

Species of rodent

The Andean leaf-eared mouse (Phyllotis andium) is a species of rodent in the family Cricetidae. It is found in Ecuador and Peru.

The Andean leaf-eared mouse lives at the highest elevation and has the highest elevation range of any known mammal, with populations found at elevations from sea level to mountain peaks of greater than 6700 meters.
