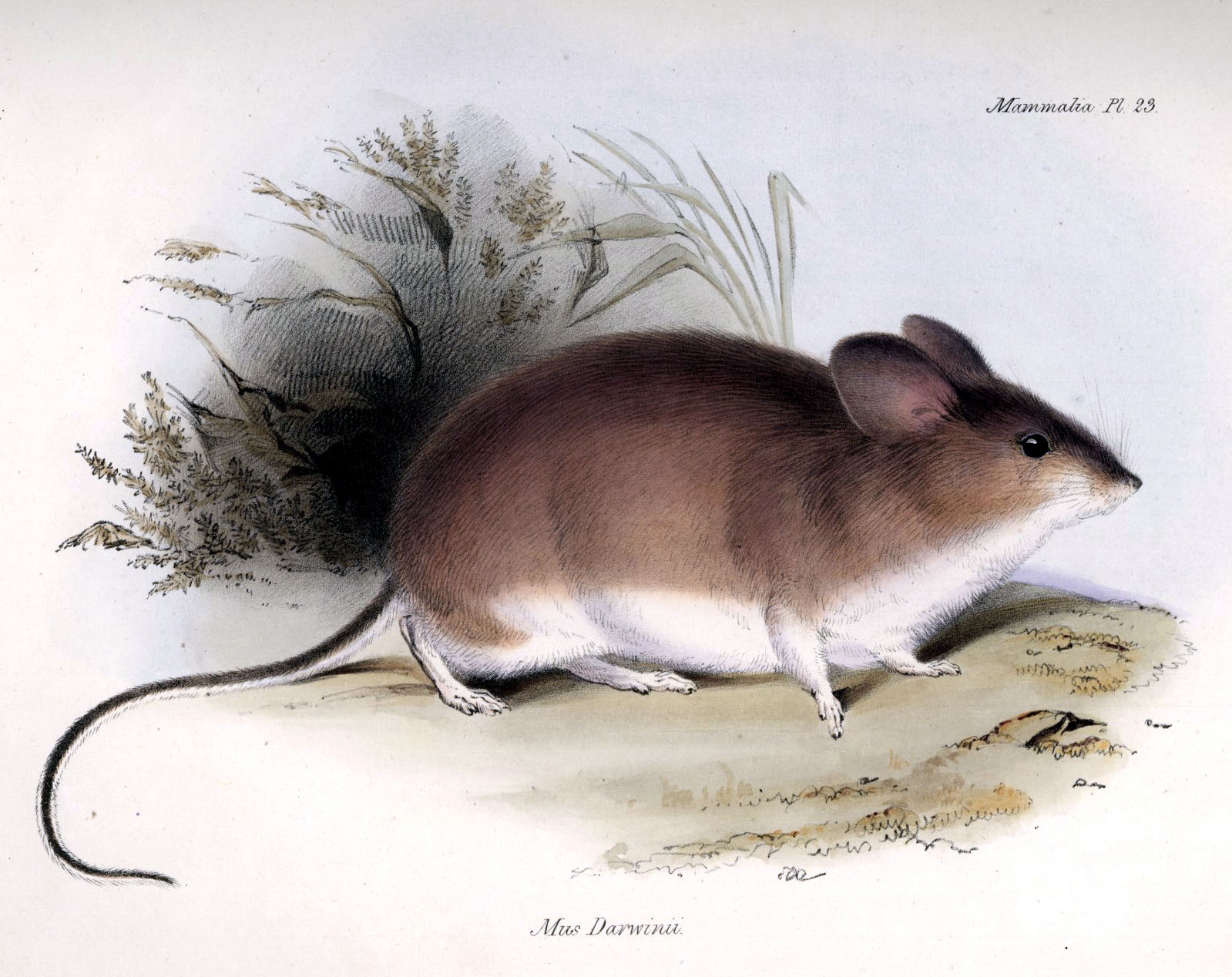
- Darwin's leaf-eared mouse (Phyllotis darwini)

Scientific classification
- Kingdom: Animalia
- Phylum: Chordata
- Class: Mammalia
- Order: Rodentia
- Family: Cricetidae
- Subfamily: Sigmodontinae
- Tribe: Phyllotini
- Genus: Phyllotis; Waterhouse, 1837

Type species
- Mus darwini

Species
- Phyllotis alisosiensis Phyllotis amicus Phyllotis andium Phyllotis anitae Phyllotis bonariensis Phyllotis caprinus Phyllotis darwini Phyllotis definitus Phyllotis gerbillus Phyllotis haggardi Phyllotis limatus Phyllotis magister Phyllotis osgoodi Phyllotis osilae Phyllotis pearsoni Phyllotis pehuenche Phyllotis vaccarum Phyllotis wolffsohni Phyllotis xanthopygus

= Phyllotis =

Phyllotis Temporal range: Pleistocene - Recent

Genus of rodents

Phyllotis is a genus of rodent in the family Cricetidae. These mice are commonly confused with Auliscomys, Graomys and Loxodontomys. In order to tell these genera apart, one must look at the tail. Species in the genus Phyllotis have a penicillate tip on their tail which is not present in the other two genera. Tails in the genus Phyllotis are also less than the length of its head and body combined whereas in Graomys, tails are longer than the head and body combined. P. xanthopygus was found at the summit of Volcán Llullaillaco (6,739 m), which is the highest altitude a mammal has yet been found in nature.

It contains the following species:

- Los Alisos leaf-eared mouse (Phyllotis alisosiensis)
- Friendly leaf-eared mouse (Phyllotis amicus)
- Andean leaf-eared mouse (Phyllotis andium)
- Anita's leaf-eared mouse (Phyllotis anitae)
- Buenos Aires leaf-eared mouse (Phyllotis bonariensis)
- Capricorn leaf-eared mouse (Phyllotis caprinus)
- Darwin's leaf-eared mouse (Phyllotis darwini)
- Definitive leaf-eared mouse (Phyllotis definitus)
- Gerbil leaf-eared mouse (Phyllotis gerbillus)
- Haggard's leaf-eared mouse (Phyllotis haggardi)
- Lima leaf-eared mouse (Phyllotis limatus)
- Master leaf-eared mouse (Phyllotis magister)
- Osgood's leaf-eared mouse (Phyllotis osgoodi)
- Bunchgrass leaf-eared mouse (Phyllotis osilae)
- Pearson's leaf-eared mouse (Phyllotis pearsoni)
- Pehuenche leaf-eared mouse (Phyllotis pehuenche)
- Punta de Vacas leaf-eared mouse (Phyllotis vaccarum)
- Wolffsohn's leaf-eared mouse (Phyllotis wolffsohni)
- Yellow-rumped leaf-eared mouse (Phyllotis xanthopygus)
