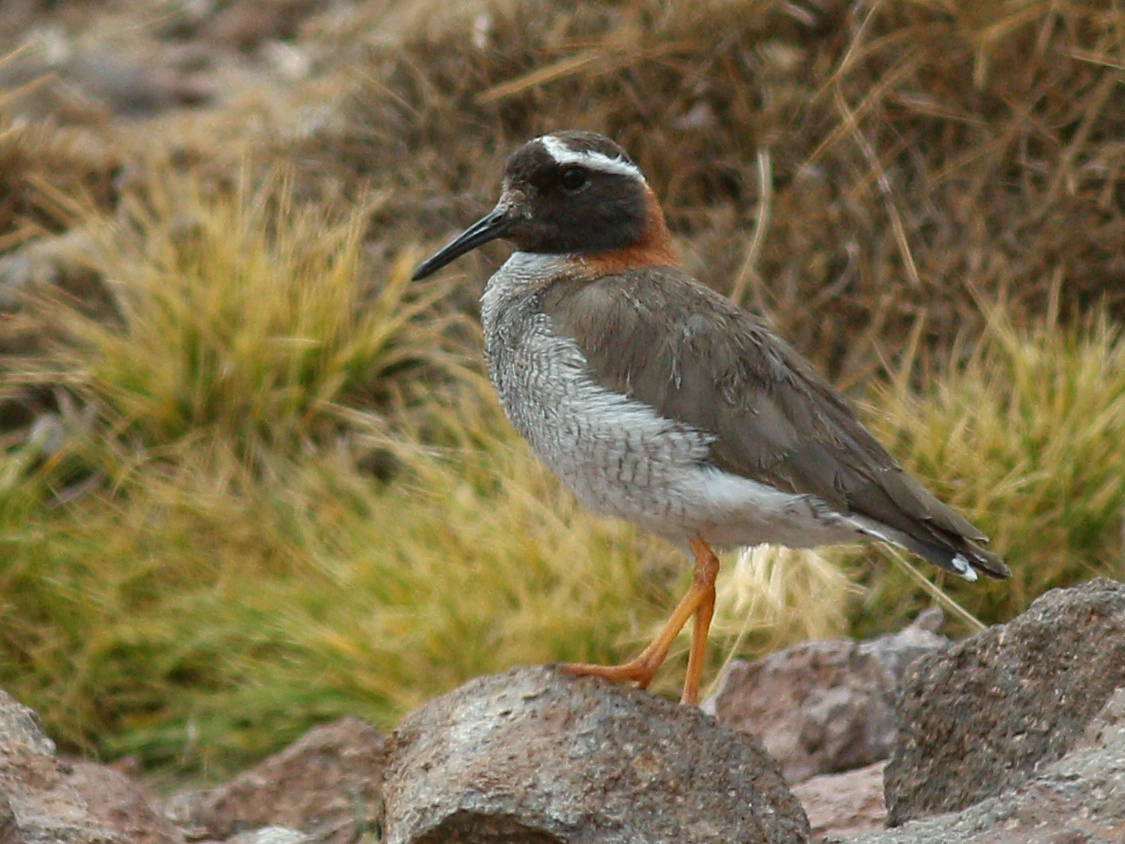

Conservation status
- Near Threatened (IUCN 3.1)

Scientific classification
- Kingdom: Animalia
- Phylum: Chordata
- Class: Aves
- Order: Charadriiformes
- Family: Charadriidae
- Genus: Phegornis; Gray, GR, 1847
- Species: P. mitchellii

Binomial name
- Phegornis mitchellii (Fraser, 1845)

= Diademed sandpiper-plover =

Species of bird

The diademed sandpiper-plover or diademed plover (Phegornis mitchellii) is a Near Threatened species of bird in subfamily Charadriinae of family Charadriidae. It is found in Argentina, Bolivia, Chile, and Peru.

== Taxonomy and systematics ==
The diademed sandpiper-plover is the only member of its genus and has no subspecies. The species has at times been thought to belong to family Scolopacidae (the sandpipers) but genetic data place it firmly with other plovers in family Charadriidae. It appears to be most closely related to several Australian and New Zealand plovers of genera Elseyornis, Peltohyas, Anarhynchus, and Pedionomus.

== Description ==
The diademed sandpiper-plover is 16.5 to 19 cm (6.5 to 7.5 in) long and weighs 28 to 46 g (0.99 to 1.6 oz). The sexes are alike. Their bill is black and slightly decurved. Their legs and feet are orange. The adult's face is black with a wide white supercilium than extends around the back of the head. Their crown is black, their nape bright rufous, most of their upperparts dark brownish gray, and their rump and uppertail coverts are black. The tail is black with white tips to the feathers. Their throat is white, their chest, belly, and flanks are barred black and white, and their vent and undertail coverts are unmarked white. Juveniles are much duller than adults. Their upperparts are mostly brownish gray with cinnamon speckles and bars. Their supercilium is grayish and their nape is washed with cinnamon or rufous.

== Distribution and habitat ==
The diademed sandpiper-plover is found in the Andes from central Peru's Department of Junín south through western Bolivia to central Chile and south-central Argentina. It is a habitat specialist found almost entirely in peatlands and bogs between the frost line and snow line. The habitat is "characterized by a network of grassy banks interspersed with long streams and vernal pools". In elevation it ranges between 4,100 and 5,000 m (13,500 and 16,400 ft) in Peru though in the southern part of its range it is found as low as 2,000 m (6,600 ft).

== Behavior ==
The diademed sandpiper-plover is almost always seen alone or in pairs. It is not known if this is true social monogamy, territoriality, a function of its sparse population, or because of lack of enough study.

=== Migration ===
The diademed sandpiper-plover is an elevational migrant in the southern part of its range. Those nesting in the highest areas move to lower ones in March and return in October. The southernmost population is thought to be at least partially north–south migratory as well.

=== Feeding ===
The diademed sandpiper-plover typically forages alone or in pairs, probing in wet ground or in shallow water and picking prey from the water surface and aquatic plants. Its diet has not been detailed but is known to be mostly aquatic invertebrates.

=== Breeding ===
The diademed sandpiper-plover's egg period is from October to December in Chile and extends into January in Bolivia. Its nest is a hollow in the ground or a platform of dried grass. All documented clutches were of two eggs. The incubation period and time to fledging are not known.

=== Vocalization ===
A diademed sandpiper-plover call given while foraging and in flight is "a clipped pic or pic-pic". What are thought to be alarm calls are "a plaintive, slightly drawn-out wheehu, a less plaintive, fairly sharp whee-u!, and a surprisingly loud screamed whistle, whEEHU!."

== Status ==
The IUCN has assessed the diademed sandpiper-plover as Near Threatened. It has a moderately large range but its estimated population of 1500 to 7000 mature individuals is believed to be decreasing. Though its habitat is thought to be relatively secure, " demand for water resources as well as overgrazing, road networks and human disturbance have been identified as threats". In addition, "[t]he unique peatlands ecosystem of the high Andes is projected to be severely reduced as a result of climate change" with up to 75% expected to be lost by about the year 2100.
