= Lima leaf-eared mouse =

Conservation status
- Least Concern (IUCN 3.1)

Scientific classification
- Kingdom: Animalia
- Phylum: Chordata
- Class: Mammalia
- Order: Rodentia
- Family: Cricetidae
- Subfamily: Sigmodontinae
- Genus: Phyllotis
- Species: P. limatus

Binomial name
- Phyllotis limatus Thomas, 1912

Species of rodent

The Lima leaf-eared mouse (Phyllotis limatus) or Lima pericote is a species of rodent in the family Cricetidae. It is found in a variety of habitats on the western slopes of the Andes from northern Chile to west-central Peru at elevations from sea level to 4000 m.
