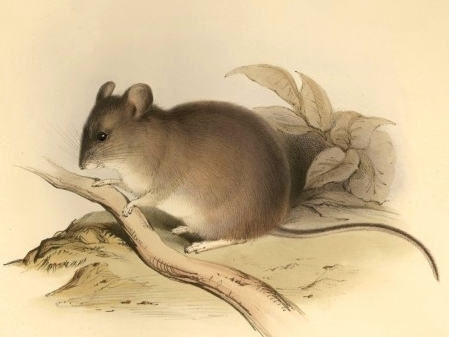

Conservation status
- Least Concern (IUCN 3.1)

Scientific classification
- Kingdom: Animalia
- Phylum: Chordata
- Class: Mammalia
- Order: Rodentia
- Family: Cricetidae
- Subfamily: Sigmodontinae
- Genus: Phyllotis
- Species: P. xanthopygus

Binomial name
- Phyllotis xanthopygus (Waterhouse, 1837)

= Yellow-rumped leaf-eared mouse =

Species of rodent

The yellow-rumped leaf-eared mouse (Phyllotis xanthopygus), otherwise known as the Patagonian leaf-eared mouse, is a species of rodent in the family Cricetidae and order Rodentia. It is the most widespread member of the genus.

== Description ==
Phyllotis xanthopygus is a predominantly greyish brown/sand-colored New World mouse that reaches around 55g in its adulthood. Its thick coat is typically lighter on its underside, most prominent posteriorly, exhibiting countershading that is typical for many small mammals as it aids in camouflage from predators. True to its name, the Patagonian leaf-eared mouse has broad triangular ears similar to other leaf-eared members that compose the genus Phyllotis.

The pelage of Phyllotis xanthopygus is known to differ seasonally. This example of phenotypic plasticity contributes to its ability to camouflage in a dynamic, seasonal, environment. Blending in with the vegetation and rocky outcrops is an important characteristic as their primary predators are raptors most notably owls, which rely on being able to spot their prey from the air. While not explicitly nocturnal, they are most active at night due to the correlation between light intensity, visibility, and predation risk.

The adults of P. xanthopygus are quite large as far as the genus goes with a body mass of fifty-five grams and large ears that are normally around twenty-seven millimeters long. The throat and chin are a pale buff or a light tan with dull grey underfur. These mice boast a long soft fur with yellow brown guard hairs that are sometimes black tipped with grey bases.

== Distribution and habitat ==
Phyllotis xanthopygus occurs in South America, specifically in the Andes mountain range in Peru, Argentina, Chile, and Bolivia from sea level to 5,000 m. While the rocky habitat of the Andes provides ample cover from predators, the high elevation environments are limited in food availability therefore restricting reproduction to the warmer months. The highest elevation the yellow-rumped leaf-eared mouse ever was found was at the summit of Volcán Llullaillaco (6739 m) and this is the highest altitude a mammal was ever found in nature.

Its distribution at high altitudes across the Andean plateau has led to plasticity in its non-shivering thermogenesis in order to cope with the low temperatures. This thermal acclimation relies on brown adipose tissue and is often induced by ingestion. This adaptation is important for small mammals like Phyllotis xanthopygus that undergo torpor because it accelerates heating during arousal events.

There is insufficient research concerning small mammalian populations south of Mendoza Argentina due to the large array of species within Rodentia as well as the continuous discovery of new members.

== Diet ==
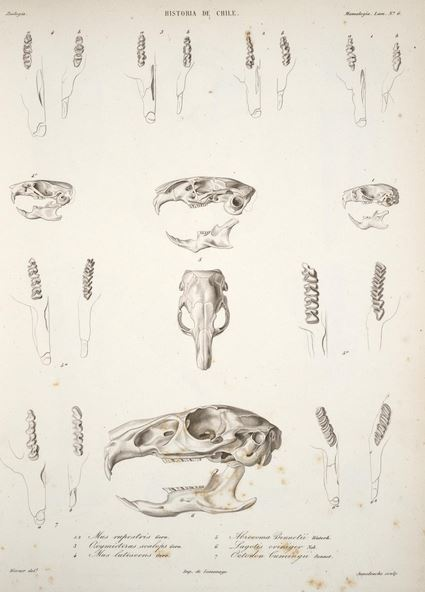

Members of Cricetidae are known for variety in their diets, for Phyllotis xanthopygus this range includes herbivory, insectivory, granivory, and frugivory. This variation enables them to be opportunistic feeders: an advantageous trait as it permits quick and unselective foraging in open and vulnerable areas.

Their teeth are specialized to accommodate for the diversity in their diet as they have enlarged incisors which are separated from the cheekteeth by a diastema. The teeth are characterized as aradicular, meaning that they grow continuously throughout the organism's lifetime. This results in the incisors resembling chisels due to rapid wear on the soft dentin at the back of the teeth from rubbing against one another.

One study that was done with these rodents tested how their behaviors changed based on the amount of light that was allowed in their habitat. The researchers found that the habitats with the least amount of light had the most foraging activity with the mice. This behavior correlates to the rodents avoiding predators by foraging in darker areas. These mice rapidly increase their metabolic heat production in cooler climates by having a high metabolic rate and using non shivering thermogenesis which better allows them to acclimate to their seasonal climates. In order to avoid predation these mice have been known to display an escape behavior due to large shadows rather than small raptor shadows. The males have also been shown to go out foraging at an earlier time than the females do.

This mountaineering mouse is the world's highest-dwelling mammal:

The yellow-rumped leaf-eared mouse can live from sea level all the way up to the peaks of Andean volcanoes, surprising experts.
