= Andes virus infection =

Disease caused by a specific virus

- Other names: ANDV infection
- Locations the Andes virus usually occurs.
- Specialty: Infectious disease
- Symptoms: Initially: Fever, muscle aches, vomiting Later: Shortness of breath, cough, abdominal pain, low blood pressure
- Complications: Hantavirus cardiopulmonary syndrome (HCPS), bleeding, heart arrhythmias, kidney problems
- Usual onset: 4 days to 8 weeks after exposure
- Causes: Andes hantavirus (close contact and possible airborne)
- Diagnostic method: Supported by PCR or serology testing
- Differential diagnosis: Influenza, legionnaire's, leptospirosis, mycoplasma, Q fever
- Treatment: Supportive care
- Frequency: Rare (mostly Argentina and Chile)
- Deaths: 35 to 50%

Andes virus infection, or ANDV infection, is a hantavirus infection by Andes hantavirus. Symptoms are usually severe. Initially there may be fever, muscle aches, headaches, nausea, and vomiting. This is usually followed by shortness of breath, cough, abdominal pain, and low blood pressure, a complication known as hantavirus cardiopulmonary syndrome (HCPS). Worsening may occur suddenly. Onset is usually 2 to 4 weeks after exposure, but can be 4 days to 8 weeks.

The virus typically circulates in rodents, particularly the long-tailed pygmy rice rat. It can spread to people who come into contact with infected rodents or their droppings. However, infected rodents do not appear ill. It is the only hantavirus that is known to spread between people, typically by close contact; though possibly airborne. Spread has been documented in the healthcare environment (although this is rare), including affected hospital staff. Diagnosis may be supported by PCR or serology testing.

Prevention involves avoiding rodents in the areas of the world were the disease occurs. There is no specific treatment or vaccine, with management involving supportive care. In severe cases, infected individuals may be intubated and receive oxygen therapy. Extracorporeal membrane oxygenation (ECMO) may be another option. The risk of death among those infected is 20 to 40%.

Andes virus infection is rare. It primarily occurs in central Andes mountains of the Argentina and Chile. Cases are most common in the spring and summer and among people who spend time in rural areas. It was initially described in 1995. An outbreak started as late as 2026. The infection is named for the Andes mountains, where it was first discovered.

== Signs and symptoms ==
Initial signs can easily be mistaken for the flu. Symptoms can appear as early as 4 days and up to 6 weeks after exposure. The only way to diagnose Andes orthohantavirus is by testing the person's blood for Andes orthohantavirus genetic material or for corresponding antibodies. Individuals are typically only infectious while they are showing symptoms such as having one or more of the following:

- Nausea or vomiting
- Headache
- Diarrhea
- Muscle aches
- Fever
- Coughing
- Shortness of breath
- Severe, rapidly progressing respiratory distress
- Fluid in lungs
- Peripheral blood counts showing rapid onsets of leukocytosis, increasing percentages of Immunoblasts, and thrombocytopenia

Complications may include kidney failure.

Symptoms of hantavirus pulmonary syndrome due to ANDV virus follow a characteristic sequence. Days 1-7 of symptomatic illness includes a flu-like illness characterized by fevers, chills, muscle aches, headaches. Some people may also have nausea, vomiting, diarrhea, and abdominal discomfort Respiratory symptoms are usually not present in this prodromal phase. This phase is followed by the respiratory phase, with symptoms including shortness of breath, coughing, rapid breathing (tachypnea), rapid heart rate (tachycardia), continued fevers, low blood pressure and low blood oxygenation (hypoxemia). The respiratory phase of hantavirus pulmonary syndrome due to ANDV virus can quickly result in circulatory collapse and death within 24-48 hours if prompt intensive medical care is not started.

In those who survive the respiratory phase, the next phase is the convalescent or recovery phase. The convalescent phase is characterized by a rapid and spontaneous increase in urine output (diuresis) followed by fatigue, malaise, and shortness of breath with walking. The recovery phase may last 2-3 weeks.

== Cause ==
ANDV, lineage ANDV-Sout, is the only hantavirus for which person-to-person transmission has been described; all other human hantavirus infections are transmitted exclusively from animals to humans. Several ANDV strains are co-circulating in Argentina (e.g. Bermejo, Lechiguanas, Maciel, Oran and Pergamino).

=== Spread ===
The virus can spread from humans or rodents, and there are multiple potential routes of infection including:

- Breathing in the virus aerosols; stirred up rodent feces or urine
- Direct contact with eyes, nose, or mouth after touching infected rodent, its feces, urine, or nesting material
- Bite from infected rodent
- Although rare, through direct or close contact with an infected person
- Bodily fluids (blood, saliva, urine, or semen)

Risk is greatest among close contacts, such as sexual partners at 18%, and household contacts at 1%. Though, there is concern of potential airborne spread. People may also spread the disease before the onset of symptoms.

=== Reservoir ===
In Argentina and Chile, the long-tailed rice rat, Oligoryzomys longicaudatus, and other species of the genus Oligoryzomys, have been documented as the reservoir for ANDV.

Although it can be carried by humans and rodents, Andes orthohantavirus is most commonly found in the Oligoryzomys longicaudatus, a species of pygmy rat native to the Chile-Argentina region, and in other cases, in the Abrothrix longipilis, a long-haired grass mouse.

=== Virology ===
==== Classification ====
Andes orthohantavirus is a species of hantavirus, a group of enveloped, negative-sense single-stranded RNA virus, belonging to the family Hantaviridae and genus Orthohantavirus. All genera excluding hantavirus are air-borne viruses while the hantavirus is rodent-borne. Transmission of the hantaviruses are through aerosol exposure to rodent bodily fluids. Additionally, hantaviruses seem to cause no detectable cytopathology in vertebrate cell cultures.

==== Genome and structure ====
The spherical virion of the hantavirus is typically 80-120 nm long and contains the segmented single-stranded genome. The tri-segmented genome includes a S (small), M (medium), and L (large) segment that code for nucleocapsid (N), glycoproteins G1 and G2, and L protein respectively. The S segment of the Andes virus contains 1876 nucleotides in total, while encoding a 547 nucleotide-long N protein. Upon comparison of S and M segments to other variants, the Andes virus was found to form a lineage with viruses such as ESQ H-1/96, CH H-1/96 Bayou, and Black Creek Canal viruses. When expressed, the M segment generates the glycoprotein precursor (GPC) which can be cleaved into the envelope Gn and Gc proteins. The L protein encoded by the L segment possesses enzymatic functions that are involved within transcription and replication.

In addition to these segments, the virion also contains RdRP which are all enclosed in an envelope. Unlike the other four genera in the family the hantavirion segments also contain a complementary 3'-terminal nucleotide sequence to the 5'-terminal sequence. These nucleotide sequences are AUCAUCAUCUG... at the 3′ end and UAGUAGUAUGC... at the 5′ end.

== Pathophysiology ==
The hantavirus replication takes place strictly in the cytoplasm of a host cell primarily targeting endothelial cells. During early infection, Andes virus can produce a weak, innate immune response in the cell. The entry and uncoating of the virus begins when the virion attaches to cell receptors on the surface of the host cell, which then brings in the virus via endocytosis. By a process called pH-dependent fusion between the virion and the endosomal membrane, nucleocapsids enter the cytoplasm. The virus genome contains its own RNA-dependent RNA polymerase (RdRp) which directs both transcription and replication of the viral genome. Once the nucleocapsids are released, RdRp initiates transcription by binding to the encapsidated segments. While M segment mRNAs are translated by membrane-bound ribosomes, L and S segment mRNAs are translated by free ribosomes. Once transcribed, the mRNA is capped by L proteins via Cap snatching. These capped RNA fragments can then be transferred to L protein, to be further trimmed in length by the endonuclease and used by the RdRp to initiate viral mRNA synthesis. Replication is terminated when the plasma membrane begins to fuse with cytoplasmic vesicles and mature virions are released.

== Prevention ==
When visiting geographical locations where Andes virus has been documented, people should avoid areas of high rodent populations where the virus is more likely to be found and transmitted quickly and easily from rodent to the next. Properly disinfecting living spaces and areas where rodents may have been present will kill the virus before it is able to be contracted. To prevent transmission from contact with infected humans, individuals, infected or not, should hand-wash frequently, abstain from kissing or sexual activity with one another, and avoid sharing spaces of close confinement for long periods of time.

== Treatment ==
There is no treatment for hantavirus pulmonary syndrome due to Andes virus and there is vaccine available. However, if patients seek medical attention quickly, early symptoms can be abated through intensive care or intubation, if necessary, for patients with severe breathing difficulties. Extracorporeal membrane oxygenation (ECMO) may be needed to maintain oxygenation in the blood.

Evidence does not support the use of either ribavirin or corticosteroids.

== Epidemiology ==
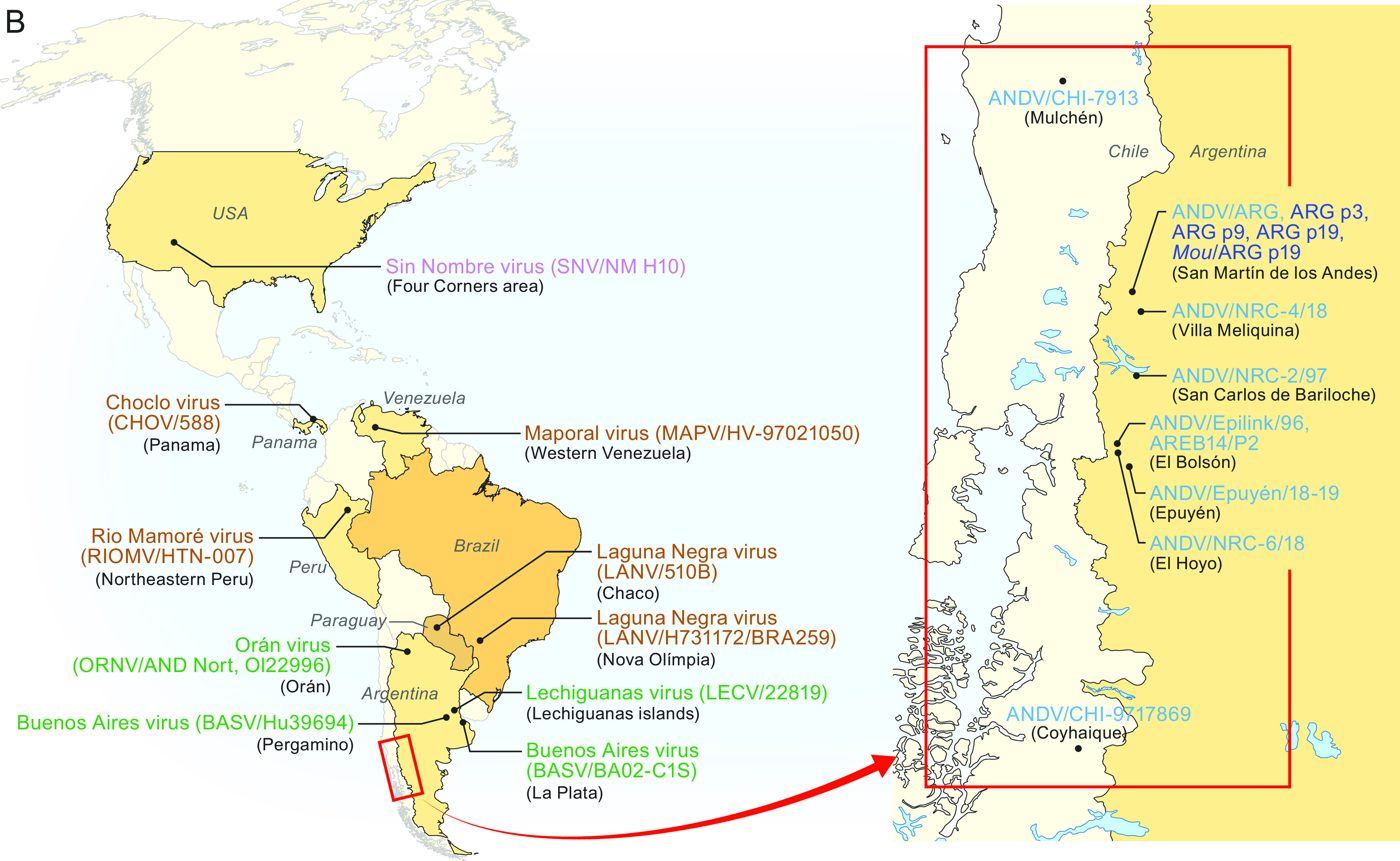
Location of the various ANDV outbreaks in blue, with all occurring in central Argentina and Chile. Not shown: the 2026 outbreak on a cruiseship that left Ushuaia, and did island-hopping in the Atlantic Ocean.

ANDV typically causes disease in Argentina and Chile.

=== Argentina ===
In Argentina the North (Salta, Jujuy), Centro (Buenos Aires, Santa Fe Province, and Entre Ríos), Northeast (Misiones) and Patagonia (Neuquén, Río Negro, and Chubut) see cases.

In Argentina, 1,350 cases of HPS have occurred up to 2016 (from various hantaviruses). It is estimated (year 2014) that about 16% of these cases were due to ANDV, making it the most common cause in that country. At least another 34 cases of ANDV occurred in late 2018 and early 2019 in Argentina.

Argentina reported 86 cases of HPS in 2025, though likely only some of these were due to the Andes virus.

=== Chile ===
In Chile cases occur in Región de Los Lagos.

In 2025 in Chile 44 cases occurred, probably due to ANDV.

=== Other ===
Rare cases of Andes virus in the United States and Europe have occurred due to travel from Argentina or Chile. In 2026 an outbreak occurred on the ship MV Hondius.

== Prognosis ==
It appears more lethal than some other hantaviruses having a mortality rate between 25% and 40% in South America.

The critical phase of the disease is fairly short, if people can survive it. There also appears to be limited permanent tissue damage.

Certain laboratory markers such as lactic acidosis (lactic acid greater than 4 mg/dL), a cardiac index less than 2.2 (less cardiac output), worsening hemoconcentration, and increased protein in the urine (proteinuria) are associated with a poor prognosis.

== History ==
Andes virus was first identified during outbreaks in Chile and Argentina. In 1995, it was characterized in Argentina on the basis of specimens from a patient who had died from HPS complications. It has been responsible for the most recorded cases in Argentina and Chile.

== Research ==
An animal model is available for ANDV, as it causes lethal disease in the Syrian hamster (Mesocricetus auratus) that closely models the course of disease progression in humans, including a rapid progression from first symptoms to death, which is characterized by fluid in the pleural cavity and the histopathology of the lungs and spleen. Lethality of ANDV in hamsters is not true of all viruses causing HCPS; hamsters infected with Sin Nombre virus, for example, show no symptoms of disease. The availability of this model allows for the study of various drugs and other treatments that may affect the treatment of all HCPS-causing hantavirus infections.

In 2024, a small phase 1 clinical trial which included 48 adults showed effective ANDV neutralizing antibodies more than 300 days after vaccination in those who received an ANDV vaccine.
