= Geoxus annectens =

Conservation status
- Vulnerable (IUCN 3.1)

Scientific classification
- Kingdom: Animalia
- Phylum: Chordata
- Class: Mammalia
- Order: Rodentia
- Family: Cricetidae
- Subfamily: Sigmodontinae
- Genus: Geoxus
- Species: G. annectens

Binomial name
- Geoxus annectens (Patterson, 1992)

Synonyms
- Pearsonomys annectens

Species of rodent

Geoxus annectens, also known as Pearson's long-clawed akodont or Pearson's long-clawed mouse, is a species of rodent in the tribe Abrotrichini of family Cricetidae. Molecular data suggests that its closest relative is Geoxus valdivianus. Formerly classified in its own genus, Pearsonomys, named after American zoologist Oliver Payne Pearson, it was moved to Geoxus in 2016 after a morphological and genetic reevaluation of the tribe Abrotrichini. This rodent is endemic to Chile, where it is found in Nothofagus forest of the Valdivian temperate rainforest ecoregion.
