= Andes virus =

Virus classification
- (unranked): Virus
- Realm: Riboviria
- Kingdom: Orthornavirae
- Phylum: Negarnaviricota
- Class: Bunyaviricetes
- Order: Elliovirales
- Family: Hantaviridae
- Genus: Orthohantavirus
- Species: Orthohantavirus andesense
- Virus: Andes virus

Synonyms
- Andes hantavirus; Andes orthohantavirus

South American orthohantavirus species

Andes virus (ANDV) is the most common cause of hantavirus pulmonary syndrome (HPS) in South America. It is transmitted mainly by the long-tailed pygmy rice rat. In its natural reservoir, ANDV causes a persistent asymptomatic or mild infection and is spread mainly through saliva. Humans usually become infected by inhaling aerosols of rodent saliva, urine, or feces. In humans, infection can lead to HPS, an illness characterized by an early phase of mild and moderate symptoms such as fever, headache, and fatigue, followed by sudden respiratory failure. The case fatality rate from infection is about 21–36%. Human-to-human transmission of ANDV is sometimes reported, but there is not a strong consensus on whether it can spread between people. Proposed ways of transmission between people involve close contact with an infected person.

The genome of ANDV is about 12.1 kilobases (kb) in length and segmented into three negative-sense, single-stranded RNA (–ssRNA) strands. The small segment encodes the viral nucleoprotein, the medium segment encodes two glycoproteins (Gn and Gc) that form the viral spike protein, which attaches to cell receptors for entry into cells, and the long segment encodes the viral RNA-dependent RNA polymerase (RdRp), which replicates and transcribes the genome. Genome segments are encased in nucleoproteins to form ribonucleoprotein (RNP) complexes that are surrounded by a viral envelope with spikes emanating from its surface.

ANDV replicates first by binding to receptors on the surface of cells. Virus particles, called virions, are then taken into the cell into endosomes, where a drop in pH causes the viral envelope to fuse with the endosome, which releases viral RNPs into the host cell. RdRp then transcribes mRNA, which is translated by ribosomes to make viral proteins, and produces copies of the genome for progeny viruses. New virions are assembled near the cell membrane, where virions bud from the cell membrane and use it to obtain their viral envelope and leave the cell. The virus's main way of evolution is by mutation, but recombination and reassortment of genome segments are possible.

Increased blooming and seeding of bamboos is implicated in elevated long-tailed pygmy rice rat populations and heightened ANDV frequency in rodents and humans. Apart from the long-tailed pygmy rice rat, Andes virus has also been found in various other Sigmodontinae rodent species in South America, most commonly the long-haired grass mouse. The virus was first identified in 1995 in Argentina and is named after the Andes mountains. Sporadic outbreaks have occurred since its discovery, including in Argentina in 1996, in Chile in 1997–1998, in Argentina in 2018–2019, and aboard the MV Hondius in 2026.

== Genome ==
The genome of Andes virus (ANDV) is about 12.1 thousand nucleotides in length and segmented into three negative-sense, single-stranded RNA (–ssRNA) segments. The segments form into circles via non-covalent bonding of the ends of the genome. The small segment, about 1.87 kilobases (kb) in length, encodes the viral nucleoprotein and a non-structural protein that inhibits interferon production. The medium segment, about 3.67 kb in length, encodes a glycoprotein precursor that is co-translationally cleaved into two spike proteins (Gn and Gc). The large segment, about 6.56 kb in length, encodes an RNA-dependent RNA polymerase (RdRp), which is responsible for transcribing and replicating the genome. The ends of each segment contain untranslated terminal regions that are involved in the replication and transcription of the genome. These ends are non-covalently connected to each other by basepairing of complementary terminal nucleotides, forming closed circular molecules.

== Structure ==
Diagram of Andes virus virions

Extracellular virus bodies, called virions, are asymmetric and pleomorphic in shape and range from 120 to 154 nanometers (nm) in diameter. They contain a lipid envelope covered in spike proteins made of the two viral glycoproteins, Gn and Gc. The spike proteins extend about 12 nm out from the surface and are tetrameric, consisting of four copies each of Gn and Gc with helical symmetry, in which Gc forms the head of the spike and mediates membrane fusion and Gn forms the stalk of the spike. Spikes are arranged on the surface in a lattice pattern. Inside the envelope are the three genome segments, which are encased in nucleoproteins to form three ribonucleoprotein (RNP) complexes. A copy of RdRp is attached to each RNP complex at the complementary ends of each segment.

== Life cycle ==
Andes virus primarily infects vascular endothelial cells and macrophages. After reaching the lungs, ANDV either enters epithelial cells or infects patrolling immune cells such as macrophages to reach endothelial cells. It enters these cells by binding to β3-integrins and protocadherin-1 receptors with its glycoproteins. (Note: Membrane cholesterol is also necessary for entry.) Virions are then taken into a cell in endosomes. Once pH is lowered, the viral envelope fuses with the endosome, which releases viral RNPs into the host cell's cytoplasm for replication and transcription.

Once the genome has been transcribed, RdRp and N proteins snatch caps from host messenger RNA (mRNA) to create viral mRNA that is primed for translation by host ribosomes to produce viral proteins. Free ribosomes translate mRNA to produce RdRp and N proteins, while ribosomes bound to the endoplasmic reticulum synthesize the glycoprotein precursor GnGc, which is co-translationally cleaved to produce the individual Gn and Gc proteins. After cleavage, Gn and Gc form into complete spikes.

For replication of the genome, RdRp produces a complementary positive-sense strand, the makes copies of the genome from this complementary strand. Progeny RNA strands are encapsidated by nucleoproteins in a helical manner to form RNPs. Spike proteins are expressed on the surface of the cell membrane. Viral RNPs are transmitted to the cell membrane where they bud from the surface, thereby obtaining their envelope as new progeny virions leave the cell. (Note: New World hantaviruses, including Andes virus, are proposed to assemble their virions at a cell's external plasma membrane by budding from the membrane to obtain their envelope, but evidence has been found of assembly at internal membranes, so where virion assembly occurs is unclear.)

== Evolution ==
The most common way that hantaviruses evolve is through mutations of individual nucleotides being inserted, deleted, or substituted. Because Andes virus has a segmented genome, it is possible for recombination and reassortment of segments to occur, whereby segments from different lineages mix in a single host cell and produce hybrid progeny.

== Ecology ==
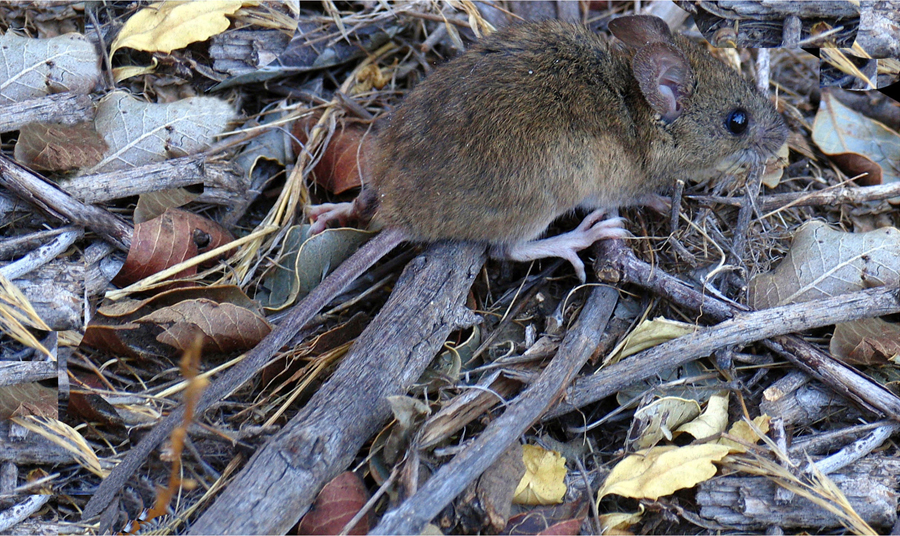
The long-tailed pygmy rice rat, the primary reservoir of Andes virus

Andes virus is carried mainly by the long-tailed pygmy rice rat (Oligoryzomys longicaudatus), a common species in rural Argentina and Chile, where it is found mainly in temperate forests, shrublands, and near rivers. Transmission of Andes virus between rodents appears to be primarily through saliva and aerosols of saliva. In its rodent hosts, it causes a persistent asymptomatic or mild infection. O. longicaudatus populations increase following blooming and seeding of bamboo species, which leads to increased Andes virus frequency in rodents and humans. Apart from the long-tailed pygmy rice rat, Andes virus can be transmitted by other Sigmodontinae rodents and is relatively common in the long-haired grass mouse (Abrothrix longipilis). Other species that ANDV has been found in at lower frequencies include:

- Darwin's leaf-eared mouse (Phyllotis darwini)
- Sanborn's grass mouse (Abrothrix sanborni)
- the hairy soft-haired mouse (Abrothrix hirta)
- the olive grass mouse (Abrothrix olivacea)
- the Southern big-eared mouse (Loxodontomys micropus)

== Disease ==
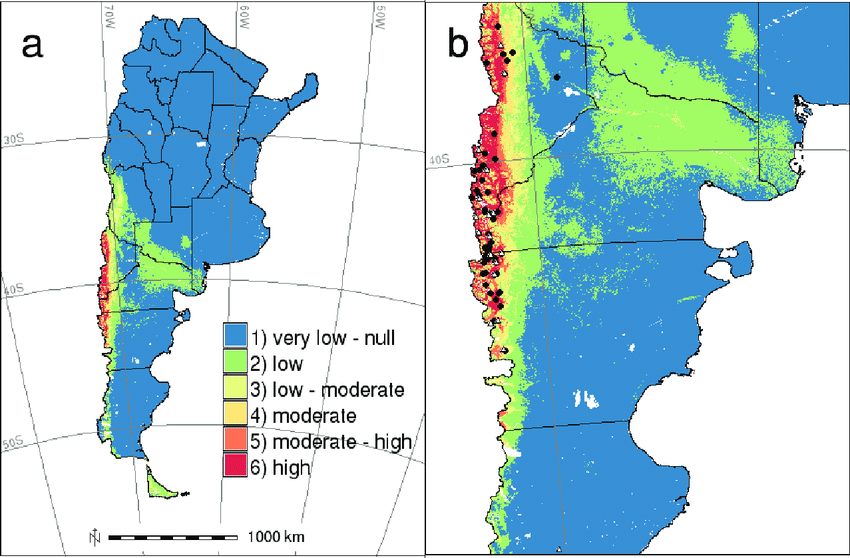
Risk map of HPS caused by Andes virus in Argentina

Andes virus infection can lead to hantavirus pulmonary syndrome (HPS), also called hantavirus cardiopulmonary syndrome (HCPS). Symptoms appear 7–49 days after exposure to the virus and come in three phases: prodromal, cardiopulmonary, and recovery. Prodromal (early) symptoms last for 2–7 days and include fatigue, fever, muscle pain, headache, coughing, nausea, vomiting, diarrhea, abdominal pain, chills, and dizziness. Some people only experience prodromal symptoms without more severe disease progression. The cardiopulmonary phase lasts for 2–4 days and is characterized by fluid buildup in the lungs, low oxygen levels in the blood, elevated or irregular heart rate, low blood pressure, cardiogenic shock, and respiratory failure. The case fatality rate (CFR) from ANDV infection is about 21–36%.

ANDV is the most common cause of HPS in South America, causing infections in Argentina and Chile. The virus is contracted mainly through the inhalation of aerosols of rodent saliva, urine, or feces. Transmission can also occur through consumption of contaminated food, through bites and scratches, and by touching an object with the virus on it, then touching one's mouth, nose, or eyes. ANDV infection is diagnosed based on observation of symptoms and testing for hantavirus nucleic acid, proteins, or hantavirus-specific antibodies. Treatment is supportive in nature and includes supplementing oxygen during the cardiopulmonary phase. No vaccines exist for Andes virus infection, so the main way to prevent infection is to avoid or minimize contact with rodents. Repeated infections of hantaviruses have not been observed, so recovering from infection likely grants life-long immunity.

=== Human-to-human transmission ===
There is not widespread consensus on whether Andes virus can spread between people. Human-to-human transmission was first reported in 1996, and there have been periodic reports since then of spread from person to person. A systematic review of research, however, did not find sufficient evidence of human-to-human transmission. In response to an outbreak in 2026 aboard the MV Hondius, a group of hantavirus experts released a statement saying that ANDV can spread between close contacts but that it is not highly transmissible. According to the group, the time when a person can spread the virus to others is unclear but most likely to occur when one is symptomatic.

Potential routes of transmission include saliva, airborne droplets from coughing or sneezing, from mother to child across the placenta or through breast milk, sexual contact, and through the digestive tract. Risk factors include sleeping in the same room as an infected person mainly right before or during the febrile prodromal phase of the disease, intimate contact, caregiving without appropriate protective equipment, and prolonged exposure to an infected person in a poorly ventilated or crowded setting. Individuals with high viral load and liver damage may spread the virus more easily. For human-to-human transmission, symptoms appear an estimated 9–40 days after exposure to the virus. According to the Centers for Disease Control and Prevention, ways to prevent infection include frequent hand washing and avoiding both direct and indirect physical contact with infected people.

== Classification ==
Andes virus is classified in the species Orthohantavirus andesense in the genus Orthohantavirus, which is in the family Hantaviridae, the family that all hantaviruses belong to. The Chile-9717869 isolate of Andes virus is the exemplar virus of the species. This taxonomy is shown hereafter:

- Family: Hantaviridae
  - Genus: Orthohantavirus
    - Species: Orthohantavirus andesense
      - Andes virus

The following viruses were previously classified in the same species as Andes virus but were removed due to insufficient information about their genomes prohibiting their classification. They may be isolates of Andes virus.

- Castelo dos Sonhos virus
- Lechiguanas virus
- Orán virus

== History ==
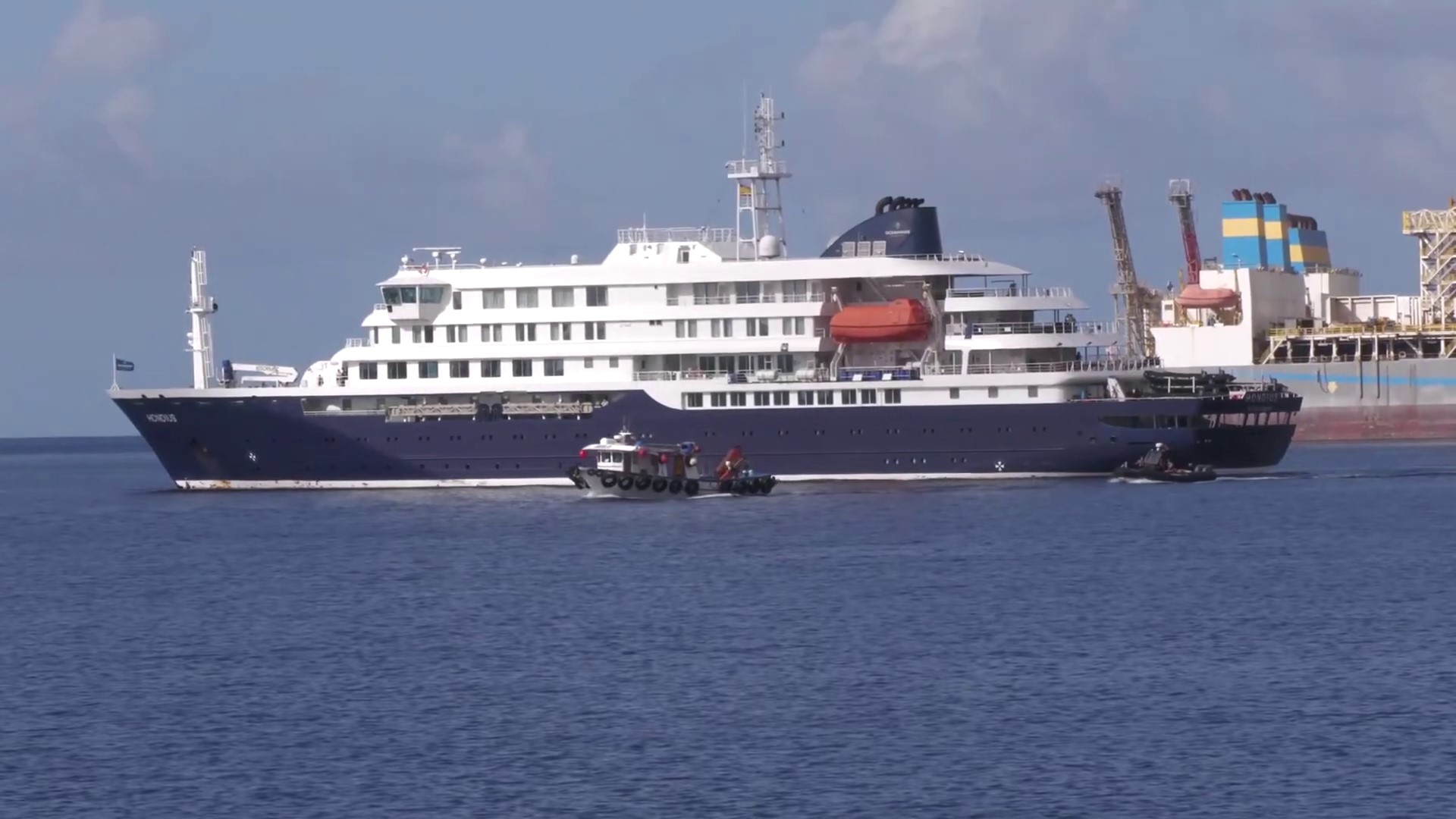
The MV Hondius at anchor in the Port of Granadilla on 10 May 2026. An outbreak of HPS caused by Andes virus occurred on the Hondius in 2026.

Andes virus was first identified in 1995 in the lungs of someone with HPS in El Bolsón, Argentina and is named after the Andes mountain range. Cases were first reported in Chile in October that same year, and retrospective analysis identified a potential case in 1993. In 1996, an outbreak of HPS caused by ANDV occurred mainly in the El Bolsón area, during which 18 people were infected and half of them died. This outbreak was the first instance in which human-to-human transmission of ANDV was reported. Since then, sporadic HPS outbreaks caused by ANDV with reported transmission between people have occurred. One such outbreak was in Aysén Region, Chile from July 1997 to January 1998, during which 25 people were infected and 13 died (52%), with possible person-to-person transmission in two clusters of cases.

In 1999, Andes virus was accepted as a species by the International Committee on Taxonomy of Viruses. It has undergone a series of changes to its species name, first changing to Andes hantavirus (2016), then Andes orthohantavirus (2017), and most recently to the current Orthohantavirus andesense (2023). Another major outbreak occurred from November 2018 to February 2019 in Chubut Province, Argentina, with 34 cases and 11 deaths (a 32% CFR) and reported transmission between people. Recently, in April–May 2026, ANDV was responsible for an outbreak aboard the MV Hondius, resulting in 13 infections and 3 deaths (a 23% CFR) with suggested human-to-human transmission on the ship. On July 28, 2026, Chile declared its first preventive health alert for hantavirus covering 13 regions from Atacama to Magallanes until July 31, 2027 due to higher fatality rates than last year.
