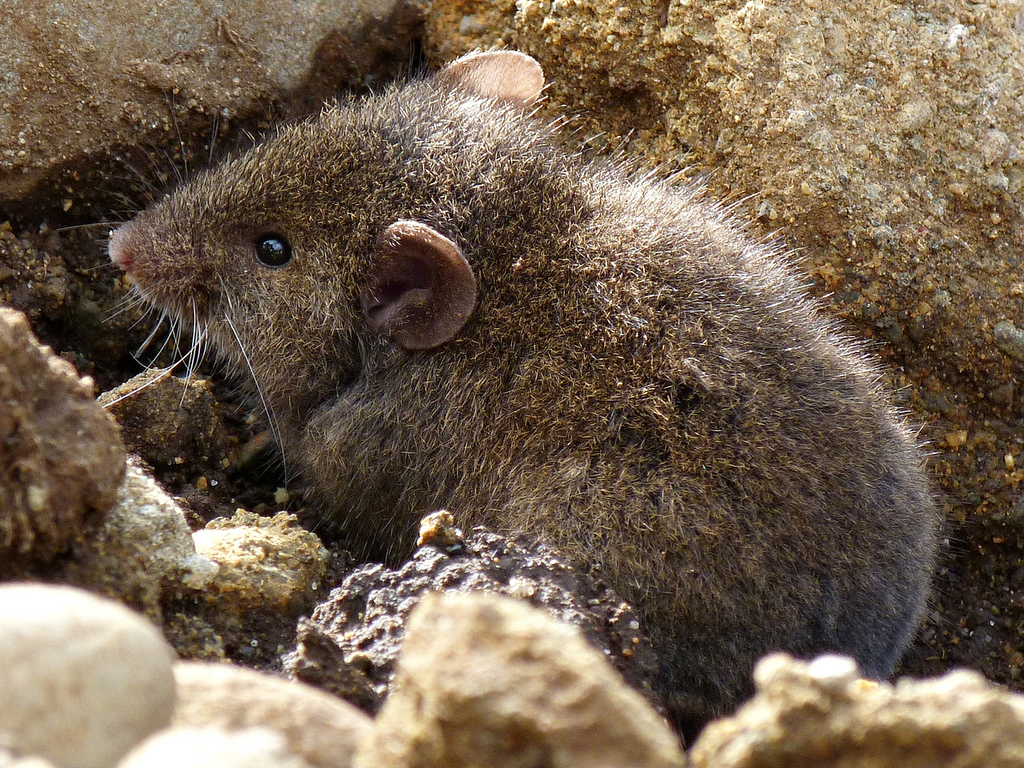
- Abrothrix sanborni

Scientific classification
- Kingdom: Animalia
- Phylum: Chordata
- Class: Mammalia
- Order: Rodentia
- Family: Cricetidae
- Subfamily: Sigmodontinae
- Tribe: Abrotrichini; D'Elía, Pardiñas, Teta, and Patton, 2007

Type genus
- Abrothrix Waterhouse, 1837

Genera
- Abrothrix; Chelemys; Geoxus; Notiomys

= Abrotrichini =

Abrotrichini Temporal range: Pliocene to Recent

Tribe of rodents

Abrotrichini, also known as the Andean clade or southern Andean clade, is a tribe of rodents in the subfamily Sigmodontinae. It includes about fifteen species in four genera, distributed in South America from southern Peru to southernmost South America, including the Patagonian steppes. The earliest known fossils are from the Pliocene of Argentina.

== Taxonomy ==
Abrotrichines were universally placed in the tribe Akodontini until the 1990s, and some were even classified within the genus Akodon. Allozyme studies in the early 1990s first provided evidence for their distinction from Akodontini, and in 1999 a study analyzing sequences of the mitochondrial cytochrome b gene found further evidence for the distinction between Akodontini and this group and proposed the name Abrotrichini for the latter. The name Abrotrichini remained formally unavailable under the International Code of Zoological Nomenclature, however, because their proposal had been conditional. Thus, the clade remained without a valid name and for this reason it was included in Akodontini in the 2005 third edition of Mammal Species of the World. Other phylogenetic studies, which also incorporated nuclear genes, affirmed the distinction between Akodontini and the new group. In 2007, Guillermo D'Elía and coworkers published a full diagnosis of the tribe Abrotrichini, validating the name.

Abrotrichini includes four genera—Abrothrix, Chelemys, Geoxus, and Notiomys—which fall into two major subgroups, one including only Abrothrix and one including the four other genera. Abrothrix has formerly been included in Akodon and includes about nine species, among which are the northernmost abrotrichine, Abrothrix jelskii as well as far southern forms such as Abrothrix lanosus. Within the remaining group, Chelemys is sister to the remaining genera; it includes three species found in central and southern Chile and nearby Argentina. The remaining three genera, each of which includes a single species, are closely related and share fossorial (digging) habits. Geoxus occurs in central and southern Chile and nearby Argentina, and Notiomys in southern Argentina,

The tribe is part of the clade Oryzomyalia, which includes most of the subfamily Sigmodontinae. Within Oryzomyalia, some studies have recovered Wiedomys as the closest relative of Abrotrichini, but the basal relationships among the components of Oryzomyalia remain elusive. Sigmodontinae encompasses hundreds of species found throughout South America and into North America. It is one of several subfamilies recognized in the family Cricetidae, which includes many more species, mainly from Eurasia and North America.

== Description ==
Abrotrichines are small to medium-sized sigmodontine rodents with long and soft, usually gray or brown fur, a short, hairy tail and large, strong feet with well-developed claws. In the skull, the snout is long, the interorbital region hourglass-shaped, and the braincase rounded. The palate is long (extending back beyond the third molars). There are no grooves in the upper incisors and the molars are not hypsodont (high-crowned). The molars lack many accessory features, in particularly the third upper molar. There are 13 thoracic (chest) vertebrae with associated ribs, 6 lumbar vertebrae, and 18 to 29 caudal (tail) vertebrae.

A karyotype of 52 chromosomes (2n = 52), present in several species, has been suggested as a synapomorphy of the tribe, but while this possibility is yet to be tested, Pearsonomys is now known to have 2n = 56 and some Abrothrix olivaceus have 2n = 44.

== Literature cited ==
- D'Elía, G. 2003. Phylogenetics of Sigmodontinae (Rodentia, Muroidea, Cricetidae), with special reference to the akodont group, and with additional comments on historical biogeography (subscription only). Cladistics 19:307–323.
- D'Elía, G., González, E.M. and Pardiñas, U.F.J. 2003. Phylogenetic analysis of sigmodontine rodents (Muroidea), with special reference to the akodont genus Deltamys (subscription only). Mammalian Biology 68:351–364.
- D'Elía, G., Luna, L., González, E.M. and Patterson, B.D. 2006. On the sigmodontine radiation (Rodentia, Cricetidae): An appraisal of the phylogenetic position of Rhagomys (subscription only). Molecular Phylogenetics and Evolution 38:558–564.
- D'Elía, G., Pardiñas, U.F.J., Teta, P. and Patton, J.L. 2007. Definition and diagnosis of a new tribe of sigmodontine rodents (Cricetidae: Sigmodontinae), and a revised classification of the subfamily. Gayana 71(2):187–194.
- Musser, G.G. and Carleton, M.D. 2005. Superfamily Muroidea. Pp. 894–1531 in Wilson, D.E. and Reeder, D.M. (eds.). Mammal Species of the World: a taxonomic and geographic reference. 3rd ed. Baltimore: The Johns Hopkins University Press, 2 vols., 2142 pp. ISBN 978-0-8018-8221-0
- Smith, M.F. & Patton, J.L. 1999. Phylogenetic relationships and the radiation of sigmodontine rodents in South America: evidence from cytochrome b (subscription only). Journal of Mammalian Evolution 6:89–128.
