= Jorge Artigas =

Jorge Artigas may refer to:

- Jorge Artigas (entomologist) (1929–2022), Chilean entomologist
- Jorge Artigas (footballer) (born 1975), Argentine football manager and former player
