= Abrothrix olivaceus markhami =

Conservation status
- Least Concern (IUCN 3.1)

Scientific classification
- Kingdom: Animalia
- Phylum: Chordata
- Class: Mammalia
- Order: Rodentia
- Family: Cricetidae
- Subfamily: Sigmodontinae
- Genus: Abrothrix
- Species: A. olivaceus
- Subspecies: A. o. markhami

Trinomial name
- Abrothrix olivaceus markhami (Pine, 1973)

Synonyms
- Akodon markhami Pine, 1973; Abrothrix markhami: Musser and Carleton, 2005; Abrothrix olivaceus markhami: Rodríguez-Serrano, Hernández, and Palma, 2008

Subspecies of rodent

Abrothrix olivaceus markhami, also known as the Wellington akodont or Markham's grass mouse, is a subspecies of the South American rodent Abrothrix olivaceus. It occurs on Wellington Island and the nearby Southern Patagonian Ice Field in southern Chile. It was previously recognized as a valid species, but is close to other recognized subspecies of A. olivaceus.

== Literature cited ==
- Musser, G.G. and Carleton, M.D. 2005. Superfamily Muroidea. Pp. 894–1531 in Wilson, D.E. and Reeder, D.M. (eds.). Mammal Species of the World: a taxonomic and geographic reference. 3rd ed. Baltimore: The Johns Hopkins University Press, 2 vols., 2142 pp. ISBN 978-0-8018-8221-0
- Patterson, B. and D'Elia, G. 2008. Abrothrix olivaceus markhami. In IUCN. IUCN Red List of Threatened Species. Version 2009.2. <www.iucnredlist.org>. Downloaded on January 12, 2010.
- Rodríguez-Serrano, E., Hernández, C.E. and Palma, R.E. 2008. A new record and an evaluation of the phylogenetic relationships of Abrothrix olivaceus markhami (Rodentia: Sigmodontinae). Mammalian Biology 73(4):309–317.
