= ANDV =

ANDV may refer to:

- Andes virus
- Andeavor Corporation, formerly Tesoro Corporation (TSO), acquired by Marathon Petroleum (ticker symbol ANDV)
