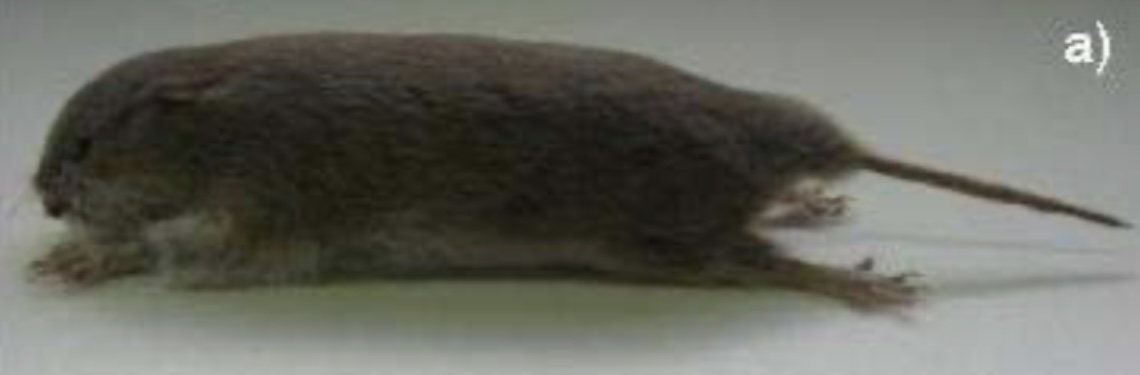

Conservation status
- Least Concern (IUCN 3.1)

Scientific classification
- Kingdom: Animalia
- Phylum: Chordata
- Class: Mammalia
- Order: Rodentia
- Family: Cricetidae
- Subfamily: Sigmodontinae
- Tribe: Abrotrichini
- Genus: Notiomys; Thomas, 1890
- Species: N. edwardsii

Binomial name
- Notiomys edwardsii (Thomas, 1890)

= Edwards's long-clawed mouse =

Genus of rodents

Notiomys edwardsii, also known as Edwards's long-clawed mouse, Edward's long-clawed akodont, or Milne-Edwards' long-clawed mouse, is a rodent in the tribe Abrotrichini from southern Argentina. It is the only species in the genus Notiomys, although species of Chelemys and Geoxus were formerly included in that genus.

== Description ==
Edwards's long-clawed mouse is a small mouse with a short tail, having a total length of about 137 mm (5.4 in), including a tail of about 40 mm (1.6 in). The dorsal fur is dense and soft and about 8 mm (0.3 in) long, each hair having a grey shaft and being tipped with ochre, giving an agouti effect. The underparts have grey hairs tipped with white, and the two body colours are separated by grey hairs tipped with orange. The eyes are small, the snout is tipped with a pink, leathery button, and the sides of the muzzle have orange spots. The whiskers are white, the longest being about 8 mm (0.3 in) in length. The pinnae are small and rounded, the thin margins being clad in white hairs. The tail is well furred, being buffy-white above and white below. The fore feet have long nails some 4 mm (0.16 in) in length. The hind feet are short and broad, being fringed with bristly hairs at the sides, and having furred heel pads and naked soles; they have 3 mm (0.12 in) claws.

== Distribution and habitat ==
The species is endemic to Santa Cruz Province, Chubut Province and Río Negro Province in southern Argentina. Its typical habitats are shrubby and herbaceous steppe, grassy steppes and rocky plateaus with shrubs and bunchgrass.

== Ecology ==
The ecology of this burrowing mouse has been little studied. It mostly feeds on insects but may also consume seeds. One specimen was found inside the burrow of a Haig's tuco-tuco (Ctenomys haigi). Before 1998, only eight localities across Patagonia were known. More recently, as a result of more-intensive surveys, over fifty localities have been identified, some by finding the remains of mice in owl pellets.

== Conservation status ==
Edwards's long-clawed mouse has a wide range and is present in several protected areas. It is common in some places and uncommon in others, and is assumed to have a large total population. No particular threats have been identified and the population appears to be steady, so the International Union for Conservation of Nature has assessed its conservation status as being of "least concern".

== Literature cited ==
- Duff, A. and Lawson, A. 2004. Mammals of the World: A checklist. New Haven, Connecticut: Yale University Press, 312 pp. ISBN 0-7136-6021-X
- Musser, G. G.; Carleton, M. D. (2005). "Superfamily Muroidea". In Wilson, D. E.; Reeder, D. M. (eds.). Mammal Species of the World: A Taxonomic and Geographic Reference (3rd ed.). Johns Hopkins University Press. p. 1136. ISBN 978-0-8018-8221-0. OCLC 62265494.
