= Pikumche pericote =

Conservation status
- Least Concern (IUCN 3.1)

Scientific classification
- Kingdom: Animalia
- Phylum: Chordata
- Class: Mammalia
- Order: Rodentia
- Family: Cricetidae
- Subfamily: Sigmodontinae
- Genus: Loxodontomys
- Species: L. pikumche

Binomial name
- Loxodontomys pikumche Spotorno, Cofre, Vilina, Marquet & Walker, 1998

Species of rodent

The Pikumche pericote (Loxodontomys pikumche) is a species of rodent in the family Cricetidae. It is known only from central Chile, where its range includes xeric shrublands (the matorral).
