= Jorge Artigas (entomologist) =

Chilean entomologist (1929–2022)

Jorge Narciso Artigas Coch (Santiago March 21, 1929 – December 13, 2022) was a Chilean entomologist and academic of the University of Concepción. Artigas graduated as an agricultural engineer from the Pontifical Catholic University of Chile. As the university of Concepción had by early 1950s created the Faculty of Agriculture in 1954 Artigas was contracted to impart the course "Agricultural Zoology". In 1967 Artigas obtained a PhD at Ohio State University. In the university of Concepción he was director of the Department of Zoology from 1970 to 2009, and played an important role in consolidating the university's Zoology Museum. In the 1970s he formally described various insect genera, and he continued this work in the late 1980s and 1990s in collaboration with Nelson Papavero. Artigas is also known for developing a staining method for protozoa. He was a member of a number of scientific societies both in Chile and abroad.

Besides his academic work, Artigas enjoyed painting, horse riding and writing poetry which he did under a pseudonym.

== Selected works ==
- Artigas, Jorge N.; Papavero, Nelson (1990). "Studies on Mydidae Diptera v. Phylogenetic and biogeographic notes key to the American genera and illustrations of spermathecae". Gayana Zoología. 54: 87–116.
- Artigas, Jorge (1994). Entomología económica (in Spanish). Concepción, Chile: Universidad de Concepción.
