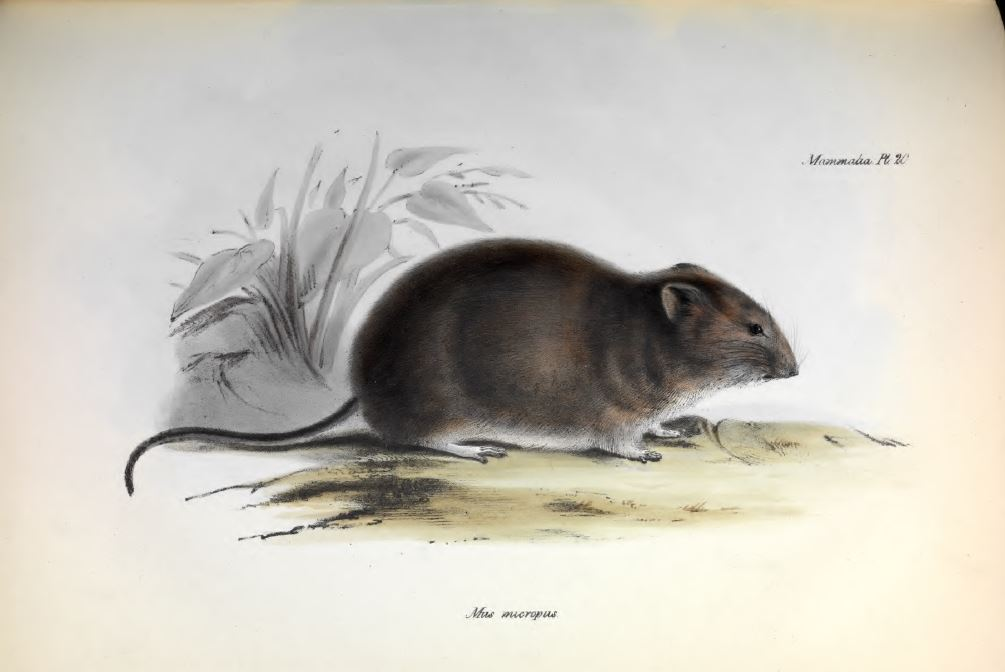
- L. micropus

Scientific classification
- Domain: Eukaryota
- Kingdom: Animalia
- Phylum: Chordata
- Class: Mammalia
- Order: Rodentia
- Family: Cricetidae
- Subfamily: Sigmodontinae
- Tribe: Phyllotini
- Genus: Loxodontomys; Osgood, 1947

Type species
- Mus micropus Waterhouse, 1837

Species
- Loxodontomys micropus Loxodontomys pikumche

= Loxodontomys =

Genus of rodents

Loxodontomys is a genus of South American rodents in the tribe Phyllotini of family Cricetidae. Two species are known, found in Argentina and Chile. They are as follows:

- Southern big-eared mouse (Loxodontomys micropus)
- Pikumche pericote (Loxodontomys pikumche)
