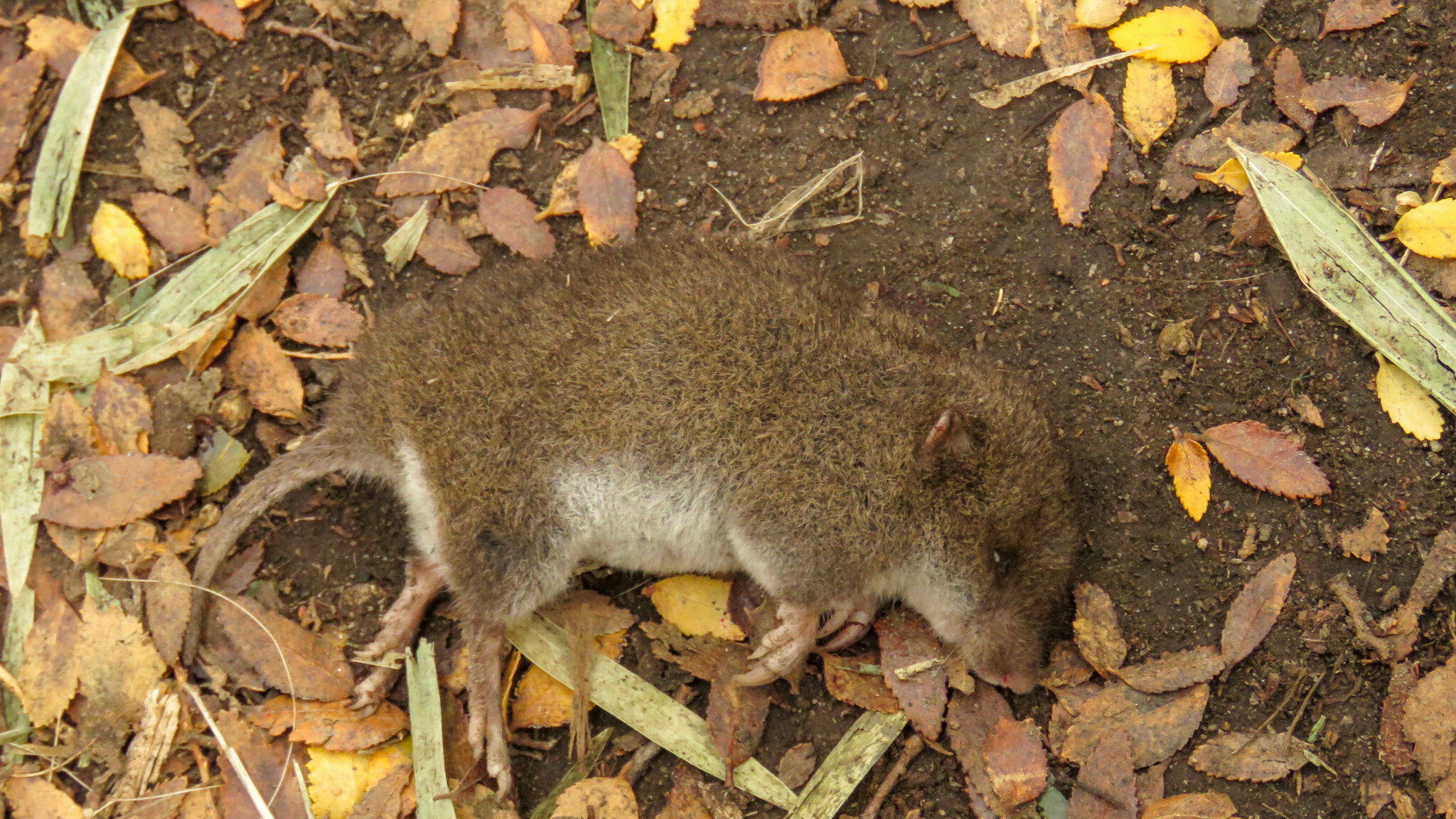

Conservation status
- Least Concern (IUCN 3.1)

Scientific classification
- Kingdom: Animalia
- Phylum: Chordata
- Class: Mammalia
- Order: Rodentia
- Family: Cricetidae
- Subfamily: Sigmodontinae
- Genus: Geoxus
- Species: G. valdivianus

Binomial name
- Geoxus valdivianus (Philippi, 1858)

Synonyms
- Oxymycterus valdivianus Philippi, 1858; Notiomys valdivianus araucanus Osgood, 1925; Notiomys valdivianus bicolor Osgood, 1943; Notiomys valdivianus bullocki Osgood, 1943; Notiomys valdivianus chiloensis Osgood, 1925; Geoxus fossor Thomas, 1919; Hesperomys (Acodon) michaelseni Matschie, 1898; Oxymycterus microtis J.A. Allen, 1903

= Geoxus valdivianus =

Species of rodent

Geoxus valdivianus, also known as the long-clawed mole mouse or Valdivian long-clawed akodont, is a species of rodent in the tribe Abrotrichini of family Cricetidae found in the Valdivian temperate rain forests and Magellanic subpolar forests of Argentina and Chile. It is one of two species in the genus Geoxus.

== Description ==
The long-clawed mole mouse is a small shrew-like mammal with a short tail and a total length of about 14 cm (5.5 in). The body is spindle-shaped, enabling this mouse to move and turn in confined spaces. The pelage is short and velvety, dark olive-brown to black, sometimes tinged with reddish brown. The snout is pointed, the eyes small and the ears tiny. The feet are large, the claws being larger than the digits.

== Distribution and habitat ==
This species is endemic to the southern tip of South America. Its range extends from southern Argentina and central Chile, including Mocha Island and Chiloé Island, to the Strait of Magellan. Its habitat is the forests of Nothofagus, Saxegothaea and bamboo found in this region, as well as tussock grassland, marshes and wet meadows; its altitudinal range is from sea level to the tree line.

== Behaviour ==
The long-clawed mole mouse digs a burrow and also moves about in surface runways near fallen logs and in dense undergrowth. It is mainly nocturnal, leaving its burrow briefly to feed on earthworms and other small invertebrates, supplemented by plant material.

== Status ==
G. valdivianus is an uncommon species but it has a wide range and no particular threats have been identified; the International Union for Conservation of Nature has assessed its conservation status as being of "least concern".
