= Abrothrix hershkovitzi =

Conservation status
- Least Concern (IUCN 3.1)

Scientific classification
- Kingdom: Animalia
- Phylum: Chordata
- Class: Mammalia
- Order: Rodentia
- Family: Cricetidae
- Subfamily: Sigmodontinae
- Genus: Abrothrix
- Species: A. hershkovitzi

Binomial name
- Abrothrix hershkovitzi (Patterson, Gallardo and Freas, 1984)

Synonyms
- Akodon hershkovitzi Patterson, Gallardo, and Freas, 1984

Species of rodent

Abrothrix hershkovitzi, also known as Hershkovitz's grass mouse or Hershkovitz's akodont, is a species of rodent in the genus Abrothrix of family Cricetidae. It is found only on some remote islands in southern Chile. It is named after American zoologist Philip Hershkovitz.

== Literature cited ==
- Mittermeier, R.A. 1997. "Philip Hershkovitz - A Remembrance". Primate Info Net. Wisconsin Primate Research Center Library. Retrieved April 6, 2009.
- Patterson, B. & D'elia, G. 2008. Abrothrix hershkovitzi. In IUCN. IUCN Red List of Threatened Species. Version 2009.2. <www.iucnredlist.org>. Downloaded on January 12, 2010.
