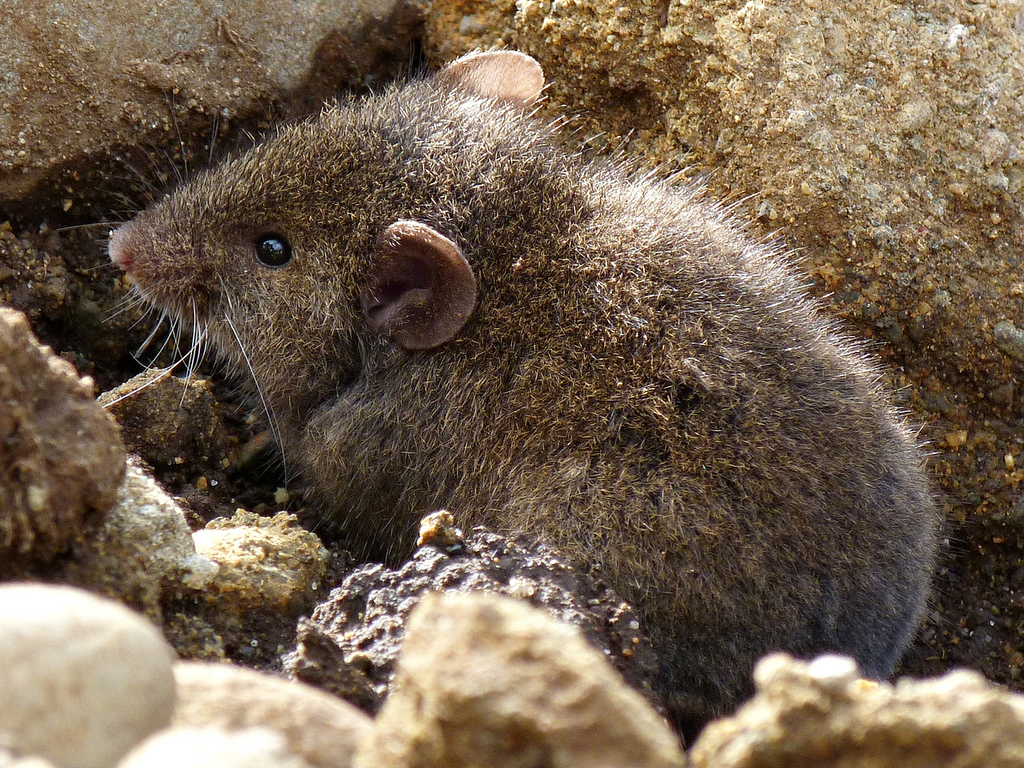
- Abrothrix sanborni

Scientific classification
- Kingdom: Animalia
- Phylum: Chordata
- Class: Mammalia
- Order: Rodentia
- Family: Cricetidae
- Subfamily: Sigmodontinae
- Tribe: Abrotrichini
- Genus: Abrothrix; Waterhouse, 1837

Type species
- Mus longipilis Waterhouse, 1837

Species
- See text

Synonyms
- Chroeomys Thomas, 1916; Habrothrix Wagner, 1843 (Note: Misspelling.)

= Abrothrix =

Abrothrix Temporal range: Pliocene to Recent

Genus of rodents

Abrothrix is a genus of rodent in the tribe Abrotrichini of family Cricetidae. It contains the following living species:

- Abrothrix andina
- Abrothrix hershkovitzi
- Abrothrix hirta
- Abrothrix illutea
- Abrothrix jelskii
- Abrothrix lanosa
- Abrothrix longipilis
- Abrothrix manni
- Abrothrix olivacea (Note: Includes A. o. markhami as a subspecies.)
- Abrothrix sanborni
- Abrothrix xanthorhina

== Literature cited ==
- MUSSER, G. G. AND M. D. CARLETON. 2005. Superfamily Muroidea. Pp. 894–1531 in Mammal species of the world: a taxonomic and geographic reference, 3rd ed (Wilson DE and Reeder DAM eds.), Johns Hopkins University Press, Baltimore.
- D'Elía, G., Pardiñas, U.F.J., Teta, P. and Patton, J.L. 2007. Definition and diagnosis of a new tribe of sigmodontine rodents (Cricetidae: Sigmodontinae), and a revised classification of the subfamily. Gayana 71(2):187–194.
- TETA, P., C. CAÑÓN, B. D. PATTERSON, AND U. F. J. PARDIÑAS. 2017. Phylogeny of the tribe Abrotrichini (Cricetidae, Sigmodontinae): integrating morphological and molecular evidence into a new classification. Cladistics 33(2):153–182.
- Rodríguez-Serrano, E., Hernández, C.E. and Palma, R.E. 2008. A new record and an evaluation of the phylogenetic relationships of Abrothrix olivaceus markhami (Rodentia: Sigmodontinae). Mammalian Biology 73(4):309–317.
