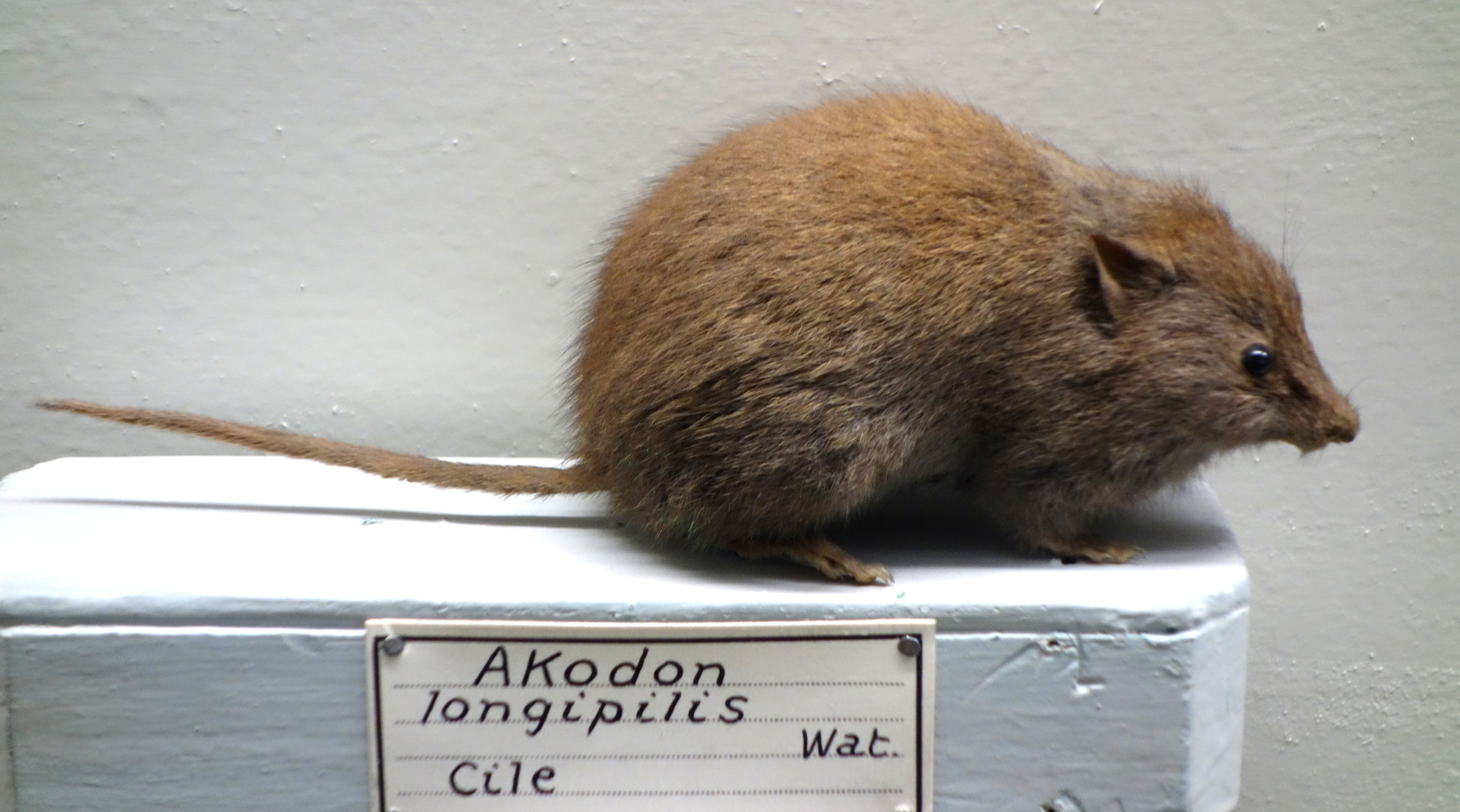

Conservation status
- Least Concern (IUCN 3.1)

Scientific classification
- Kingdom: Animalia
- Phylum: Chordata
- Class: Mammalia
- Order: Rodentia
- Family: Cricetidae
- Subfamily: Sigmodontinae
- Genus: Abrothrix
- Species: A. longipilis

Binomial name
- Abrothrix longipilis (Waterhouse, 1837)

Synonyms
- Mus longipilis Waterhouse, 1837; Akodon longipilis (Waterhouse, 1837)

= Abrothrix longipilis =

Species of rodent

Abrothrix longipilis, also known as the long-haired grass mouse or long-haired akodont, is a species of rodent in the family Cricetidae. It is endemic to central Argentina and Chile. Until 2014 it was thought that the species extended into southern Chile and Argentine Patagonia but these populations are now proposed to belong to closely related species named Abrothrix hirta.

The southern Chilean Abrothrix sanborni may not be distinct from this species.

== Description ==
The long-haired grass mouse is a large, robust grass mouse, with a head-and-body length of about 130 mm (5 in). It varies in colour across its wide range, but in most populations the dorsal hair is reddish-brown with long guard hairs, the flanks are more greyish and the underparts are grey. The tail is bicoloured, dark above and pale below.

== Distribution and habitat ==
The species is found in central and southern Chile, and in Argentina as far southward as the Rio Negro and Chubut provinces of Patagonia. Its chief habitat is the Nothofagus forests of the region but it is also found in rocky areas, marshy areas, tussock grass and steppe with shrubs.

== Ecology ==
The long-haired grass mouse is active both in the day and the night. It is an efficient excavator and digs burrows, but it is also a good tree climber. In Argentina it feeds on berries, seeds, insects, slugs, worms, fungi and fern spores. The diet differs in different parts of Chile, either consisting of insects and plant material, or insects and fungi, just insects or just fungi. Breeding takes place in the spring and summer. The litter size averages just below four and at least some individuals overwinter twice. Home ranges in the Patagonian Nothofagus forest vary between 0.4 and 4.8 individuals per hectare in spring, and 2.8 to 10.8 individuals per hectare in autumn. This grass mouse is preyed on by the barn owl, the lesser horned owl, the rufous-legged owl, the white-tailed kite and the South American gray fox. It is also an important reservoir species for the Andes virus, which is a major causative agent of the disease Hantavirus cardiopulmonary syndrome.

== Status ==
A. longipilis has a wide range and is presumed to have a large total population. The population trend may be downward but it is an abundant species and the decline is not at a rate to cause concern, so the International Union for Conservation of Nature has rated its conservation status as being of "least concern".

== Literature cited ==
- Musser, G. G.; Carleton, M. D. (2005). "Superfamily Muroidea". In Wilson, D. E.; Reeder, D. M. (eds.). Mammal Species of the World: A Taxonomic and Geographic Reference (3rd ed.). Johns Hopkins University Press. pp. 894–1531. ISBN 978-0-8018-8221-0. OCLC 62265494.
