= Abrothrix lanosa =

Conservation status
- Least Concern (IUCN 3.1)

Scientific classification
- Kingdom: Animalia
- Phylum: Chordata
- Class: Mammalia
- Order: Rodentia
- Family: Cricetidae
- Subfamily: Sigmodontinae
- Genus: Abrothrix
- Species: A. lanosa

Binomial name
- Abrothrix lanosa (Thomas, 1897)

Synonyms
- Oxymycterus lanosus Thomas, 1897; Akodon lanosus (Thomas, 1897)

Species of rodent

Abrothrix lanosa, also known as the woolly grass mouse or woolly akodont, is a species of rodent in the family Cricetidae. It is found in southern Argentina and Chile. It was previously classified in the genus Akodon rather than Abrothrix.
