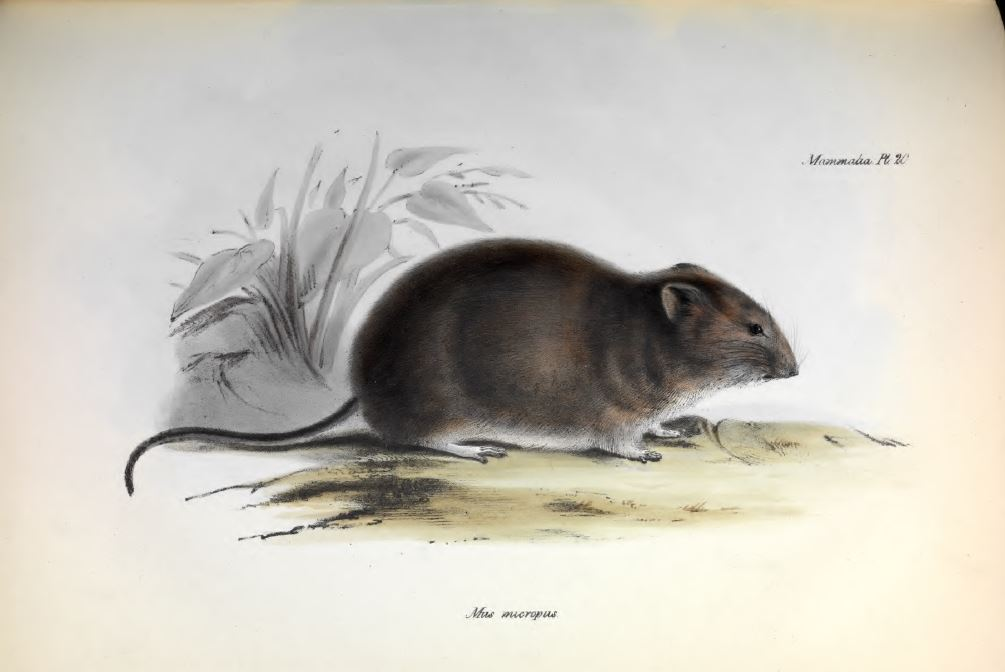

Conservation status
- Least Concern (IUCN 3.1)

Scientific classification
- Kingdom: Animalia
- Phylum: Chordata
- Class: Mammalia
- Order: Rodentia
- Family: Cricetidae
- Subfamily: Sigmodontinae
- Genus: Loxodontomys
- Species: L. micropus

Binomial name
- Loxodontomys micropus (Waterhouse, 1837)

Synonyms
- Auliscomys micropus Phyllotis micropus

= Southern big-eared mouse =

Species of rodent

The southern big-eared mouse (Loxodontomys micropus), also known as the southern pericote, is a species of rodent in the family Cricetidae. It is found in Argentina and Chile, and is one of only two species in its genus. The type specimen was captured by Charles Darwin in 1834 along the Santa Cruz River in Argentina, during the voyage of HMS Beagle, and was subsequently described by George Robert Waterhouse.

== Description ==
The southern big-eared mouse has a relatively heavy build for a mouse, accentuated by its thick fur. Fully grown adults of both sexes range from 237 to 242 millimetres (9.3 to 9.5 in) in total length, including the tail, and weigh between 45 and 105 grams (1.6 and 3.7 oz). It is however, not unusual for individuals to reach sexual maturity long before they reach the full adult size.

The fur is dull greyish-brown over most of the body, with paler greyish or yellowish underparts. As its name suggests. it has larger ears than many other local species of mouse, although they are not dramatically so. The feet are sturdy, and the fifth toe on the hind feet is unusually long. The tail is about three-quarters the length of the body, and is covered with sparse fur. It can most readily be distinguished from other nearby mouse species by its robust build, relatively long tail, and the absence of hair on the feet. Females have four pairs of teats, running from the axillary region down to the groin.

== Distribution and habitat ==
The southern big-eared mouse is found in the Andean foothills of southern Chile and south-western Argentina, from about 38°S down to the Straits of Magellan. A few isolated populations are also known from hilly regions of south-central Argentina, and the species is also found on Chiloé Island in Chile. It inhabits environments with heavy vegetation and good ground cover at elevations up to 3,000 metres (9,800 ft). It is most commonly found in forests dominated by southern beech trees, with dense undergrowth of South American bamboo. However, it can also be found in bushy scrub, such as that formed by barberries and Colletia, and in humid grasslands.

=== Subspecies ===
Three subspecies are currently recognised, and can be distinguished by subtle variations in the colour of the coat and feet:

- Loxodonta micropus micropus
- Loxodonta micropus alsus
- Loxodonta micropus fumipes - Chiloé Island

== Biology ==
The southern big-eared mouse is a nocturnal herbivore, although it may sometimes be active during the day. They dig burrows with numerous entrances, and have been known to store food. It feeds primarily on leaves, seeds, and grasses, but also eats some fungi. Population densities have been reported to vary between 0.9 and 4.1 per hectare (0.36 and 1.66/acre), depending on the local environment and time of year, with more individuals being found in the autumn.

The most common predators of the species include various owls, such as barn owls, short-eared owls, and lesser horned owls. However, various other local predators, including lesser grisons, zorros, and buzzard-eagles, may also include southern big-eared mice in their diets.

Southern big-eared mice breed throughout the spring and summer, and typically give birth to litters of four or five young. The young reach independence at a relatively early age, and those born in spring are generally reproductively active before the breeding season finishes in late summer. Individuals may be able to breed by the time they reach a body weight of 48 grams (1.7 oz), considerably less than the full adult size.
