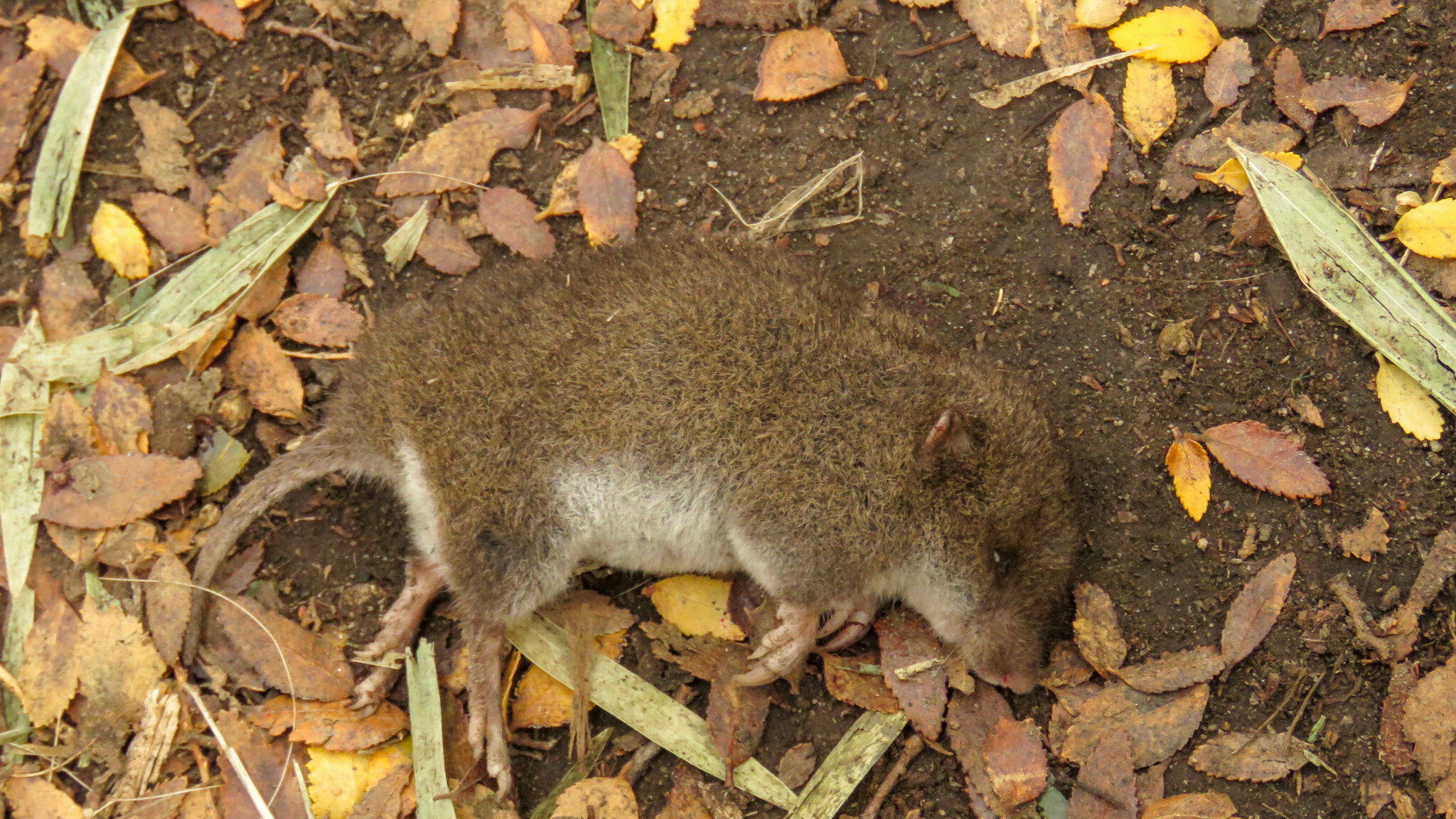
- Geoxus valdivianus

Scientific classification
- Kingdom: Animalia
- Phylum: Chordata
- Class: Mammalia
- Infraclass: Placentalia
- Order: Rodentia
- Family: Cricetidae
- Subfamily: Sigmodontinae
- Tribe: Abrotrichini
- Genus: Geoxus; Thomas, 1919

Type species
- Oxymycterus valdivianus

Species
- Geoxus annectens Geoxus valdivianus

= Geoxus =

Genus of rodents

Geoxus is a genus of South American rodents in the tribe Abrotrichini of family Cricetidae. Two species—Geoxus valdivianus and Geoxus annectens are known.
