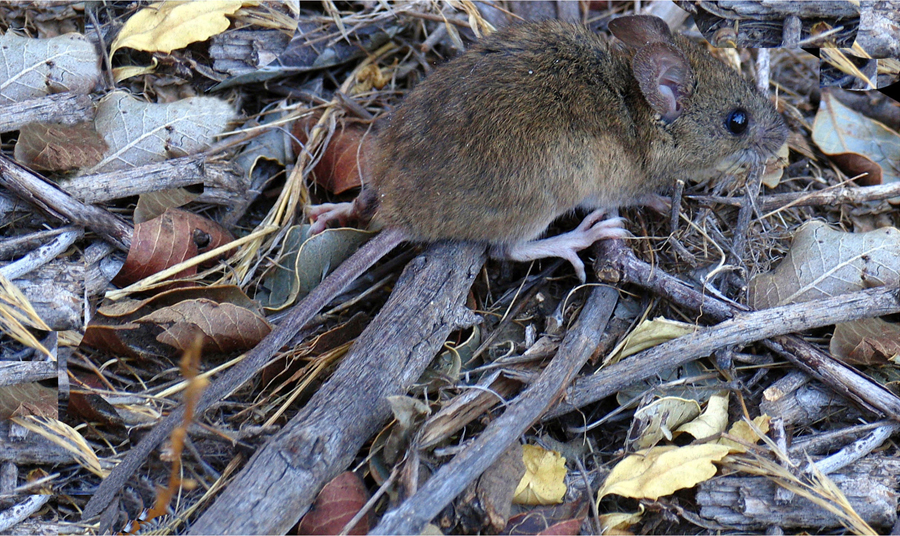

Conservation status
- Least Concern (IUCN 3.1)

Scientific classification
- Kingdom: Animalia
- Phylum: Chordata
- Class: Mammalia
- Order: Rodentia
- Family: Cricetidae
- Subfamily: Sigmodontinae
- Genus: Oligoryzomys
- Species: O. longicaudatus

Binomial name
- Oligoryzomys longicaudatus (Bennett, 1832)
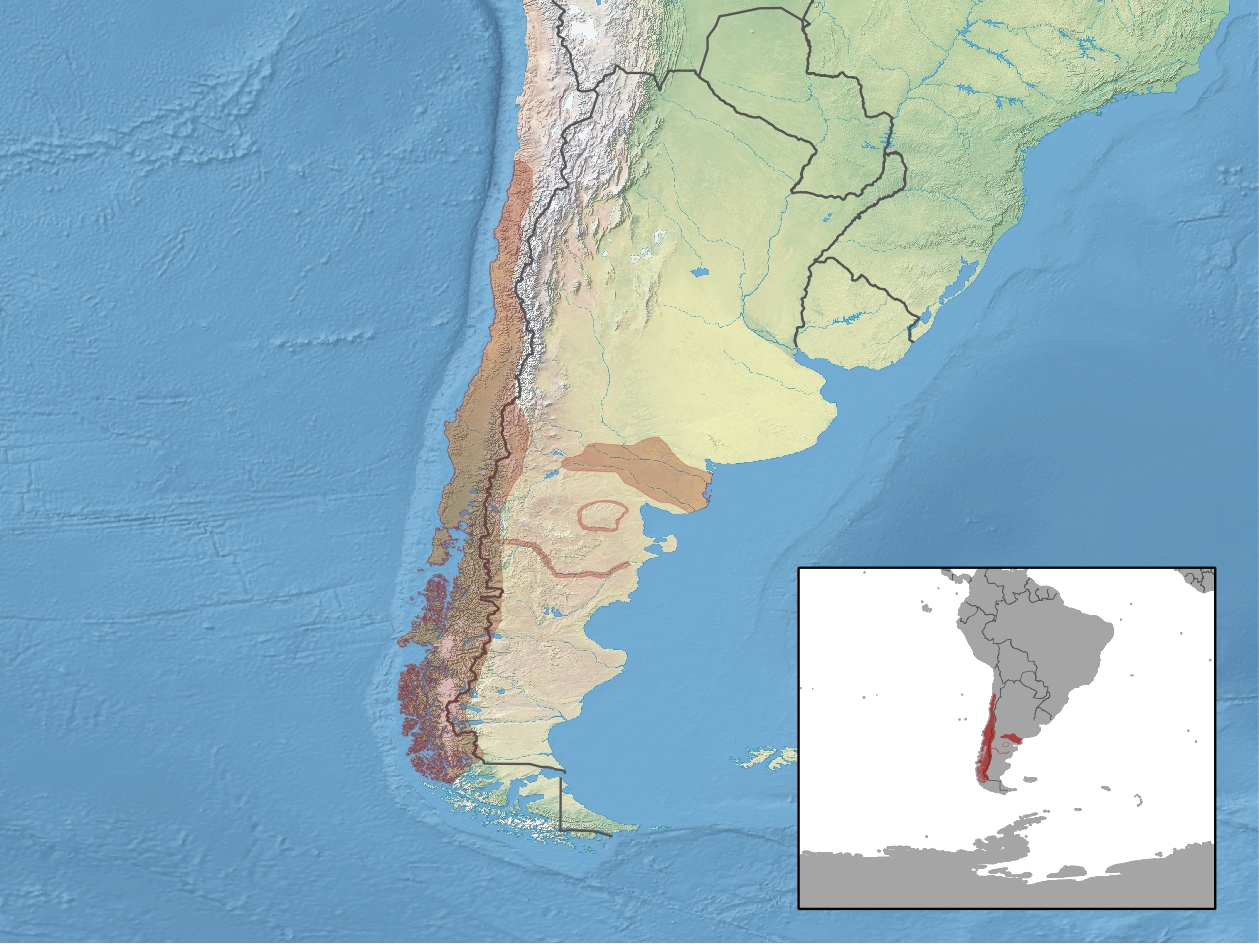

= Oligoryzomys longicaudatus =

Species of rodent

Oligoryzomys longicaudatus, also known as the long-tailed colilargo or long-tailed pygmy rice rat, is a species of rodent in the genus Oligoryzomys of the family Cricetidae. It is found in the southern Andes of Chile and Argentina, with an outlying population in eastern Argentina. As a common species with a wide range and a stable population, the International Union for Conservation of Nature has rated this rodent as being of "least concern".

== Description ==
O. longicaudatus grows to a total length of 222 mm (8.7 in), including a tail of 127 mm (5.0 in), and weighs about 24 g (0.8 oz). The ears are quite small and are scantily clad with hairs. The tail is also scantily haired and is dark above and pale on the underside. The fur on the back is buff with fine pale brown and black lines, the greyish base of the hairs sometimes being visible. The underparts are greyish-white. The tail is shorter at the southern end of the range, and in Argentina, the fur is tinted with ochre, especially on the flanks. Its karyotype has 2n = 58 and FNa = 74.

== Distribution and habitat ==
This is a mountain species native to southern South America; its range extends from northern Chile and northwestern Argentina to about 50°S in Patagonia. It is found in forests among undergrowth and in bushy places. In northern Chile, it is the most abundant small rodent in the cloud forest. In Patagonia, it prefers clearings, road verges, and scrubby areas. It is more common in moist habitats, such as near water bodies.

== Ecology ==
O. longicaudatus climbs well and can also jump. The diet varies with the time of year; in the dry season it is mainly seeds but in the wet season the flowers, pollen and leaves of Chenopodium predominate. Insects are also sometimes eaten. O. longicaudatus can start breeding when only a few months old. The nest is built in bushes a few metres off the ground, and an old bird nest may be used. The female can breed three times a year and the average litter size is nearly five young.

Population size is subject to large swings. In 1990, there was a mass seeding event when over a million hectares of the bamboo Chusquea valdiviensis in southern Chile flowered simultaneously; the enormous quantities of seeds produced were followed by a population explosion of O. longicaudatus. Such increases in rodent numbers are the result of greater fecundity, a higher survival of juveniles and a lengthening of the breeding season. Since many of the bamboo seeds were retained within the flowering spikelets till the following year, further rodent population peaks occurred then.

In the spring of 1997, large numbers of mice were found in forests near Nahuel Huapi Lake in southwestern Argentina. They were predominantly O. longicaudatus, with a smaller proportion of Abrothrix longipilis. Dead individuals that washed up on the beaches were young, born in the previous autumn, and had full stomachs. Their appearance at such a high density was the result of an aperiodic outbreak in the Andes, and living specimens that were caught in traps showed no signs of being in breeding condition. It was not until the following year that numbers of individuals returned to their normal level for the area and breeding started taking place again.

O. longicaudatus is the principal reservoir host of Andes virus (ANDV), which causes most cases of hantavirus cardiopulmonary syndrome in South America. This disease can be fatal to humans.

== Literature cited ==
- Musser, G. G.; Carleton, M. D. (2005). "Superfamily Muroidea". In Wilson, D. E.; Reeder, D. M. (eds.). Mammal Species of the World: A Taxonomic and Geographic Reference (3rd ed.). Johns Hopkins University Press. pp. 894–1531. ISBN 978-0-8018-8221-0. OCLC 62265494.
