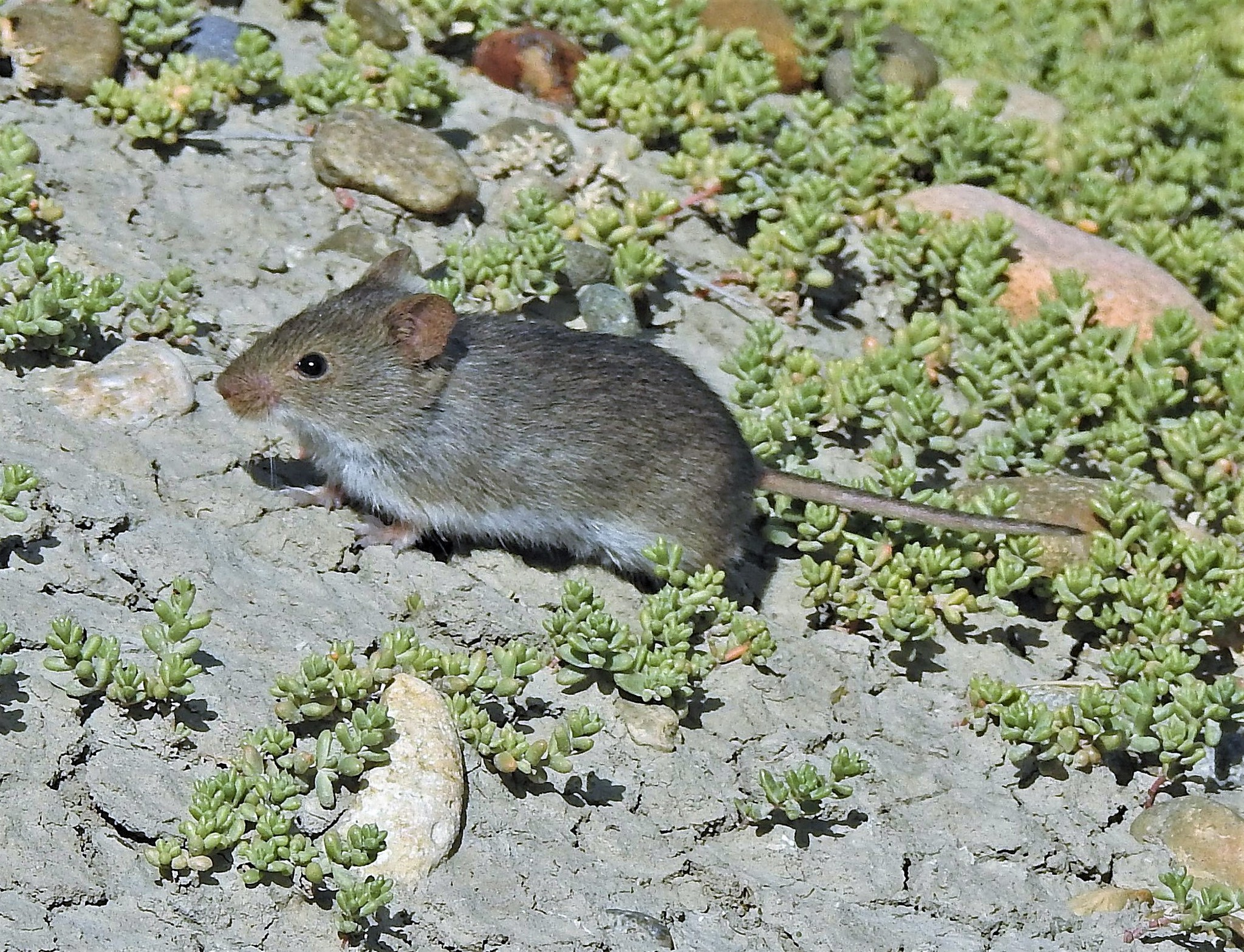

Conservation status
- Least Concern (IUCN 3.1)

Scientific classification
- Kingdom: Animalia
- Phylum: Chordata
- Class: Mammalia
- Order: Rodentia
- Family: Cricetidae
- Subfamily: Sigmodontinae
- Genus: Abrothrix
- Species: A. olivacea

Binomial name
- Abrothrix olivacea (Waterhouse, 1837)

Synonyms
- Akodon mansoensis Akodon olivaceus Akodon xanthorhinus Abrothrix olivaceus

= Olive grass mouse =

Species of rodent

Abrothrix olivacea, also known as the olive grass mouse or olive akodont, is a species of rodent in the genus Abrothrix of family Cricetidae. It is found from northern Chile into southern Chile and Argentina, including the islands of Tierra del Fuego. It is prone to large swings in population size.

== Description ==
The olive grass mouse is a small rodent with a total length of about 17 cm (6.7 in). The upper parts are greyish-brown, sometimes slightly yellowish around the snout, and the underparts are pale to mid-grey.

== Genomics ==
A scaffold-level genome assembly of Abrothrix olivacea was published in 2026. The genome size is approximately 2.25 Gb, with a BUSCO completeness of 98.6%. A total of 21,476 protein-coding genes were identified. This was reported as the first genome assembly for a member of the sigmodontine tribe Abrotrichini.

== Taxonomy ==
Abrothrix olivacea has had a complex history in both of the genera Akodon and Abrothrix, and includes at least 27 synonyms. A few, including markhami, mansoensis, and xanthorhinus have been viewed as valid species until recent years, and several subspecies are still recognized, including Abrothrix olivacea markhami.

== Distribution and habitat ==
This species is found in northern and central Chile and the westernmost fringes of Argentina, southern Chile and Patagonia, including the larger offshore islands and the islands of Tierra del Fuego. Its habitat varies; in Patagonia it inhabits arid bushy steppes; further north it is found in the forests of Nothofagus, Saxegothaea and bamboo; elsewhere it occurs in tussocky grassland, marshes and wet meadows.

It is found in Hornos Island which makes it the southernmost native land mammal in the world.

== Ecology ==
The olive grass mouse is mostly diurnal. In grassy habitats, it creates runways and makes a nest of grasses in a tussock, among roots or under a rock. It can climb and also dig, and in Chile it sometimes occupies burrows made by other mammals such as the coruro (Spalacopus cyanus). It feeds on berries, seeds, shoots, leaves, fungi and small invertebrates. It breeds in spring and summer and litter sizes average five young. Under favourable conditions, and in El Niño years, populations can increase dramatically. This mouse is preyed on by barn owls (Tyto tyto) and lesser horned owls (Bubo magellanicus), various other birds and foxes. The Olive grass mouse is a host of the Acanthocephalan intestinal parasite Moniliformis amini.

Outbreaks of this species sometimes occur. In 1990, the bamboo Chusquea valdiviensis had a mass seeding phenomenon in which over a million hectares of this bamboo in southern Chile flowered at the same time and then died. The enormous quantities of seeds were followed by a mass population increase of the rice rat Oligoryzomys longicaudatus and to a lesser extent, of the olive grass mouse. Increases in rodent numbers can be attributed to a greater fecundity, a higher survival rate of juveniles and an extension in the breeding season. Since many of the bamboo seeds were retained within the flowering spikelets for a year, further rodent population peaks occurred in subsequent years.

== Status ==
A. olivacea is a common species with a presumed large population. It has a wide range and is present in several protected areas. It seems tolerant of habitat degradation and no particular threats have been identified, so the International Union for Conservation of Nature has rated its conservation status as being of "least concern".

== Literature cited ==
- Musser, G. G.; Carleton, M. D. (2005). "Superfamily Muroidea". In Wilson, D. E.; Reeder, D. M. (eds.). Mammal Species of the World: A Taxonomic and Geographic Reference (3rd ed.). Johns Hopkins University Press. pp. 894–1531. ISBN 978-0-8018-8221-0. OCLC 62265494.
- Rodríguez-Serrano, E.; Hernández, C.E.; Palma, R.E. (2008). "A new record and an evaluation of the phylogenetic relationships of Abrothrix olivaceus markhami (Rodentia: Sigmodontinae)". Mammalian Biology. 73 (4): 309–317. Bibcode:2008MamBi..73..309R. doi:10.1016/j.mambio.2007.10.003. hdl:10533/139822.
