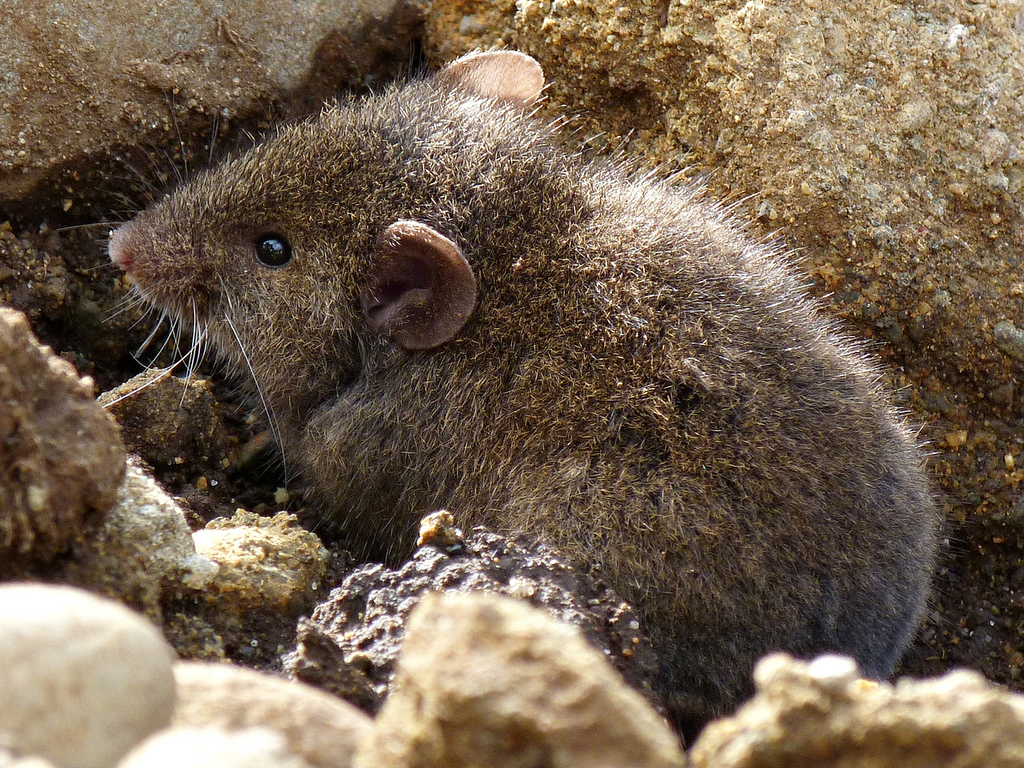

Conservation status
- Near Threatened (IUCN 3.1)

Scientific classification
- Kingdom: Animalia
- Phylum: Chordata
- Class: Mammalia
- Order: Rodentia
- Family: Cricetidae
- Subfamily: Sigmodontinae
- Genus: Abrothrix
- Species: A. sanborni

Binomial name
- Abrothrix sanborni (Osgood, 1943)

Synonyms
- Akodon (Abrothrix) sanborni Osgood, 1943

= Abrothrix sanborni =

Species of rodent

Abrothrix sanborni, also known as Sanborn's grass mouse or Sanborn's akodont, is a species of rodent in the genus Abrothrix of family Cricetidae. It is found in southern Argentina and Chile, but may not be distinct from A. longipilis.
