= Gayana =

- Discipline: Zoology, oceanology
- Language: English, Spanish
- Edited by: Alfredo Saldaña

Publication details
- History: 1999–present
- Publisher: University of Concepción (Chile)
- Frequency: Biannually
- Open access: Yes
- License: CC-BY-NC 4.0

Standard abbreviations
- ISO 4: Gayana

Indexing
- ISSN: 0717-652X (print); 0717-6538 (web)

Links
- Journal homepage; Journal page at SciELO

Gayana is a biannual peer-reviewed scientific journal published by the University of Concepción. It covers zoology and oceanology works on taxonomy, systematics, phylogeny, biogeography, environmental biology, biotechnology, limnology, hydrology and atmospheric sciences. It was established by the merger of two journals; Gayana Oceanología and Gayana Zoología. Gayana Botánica remains a separate journal.

== Abstracting and indexing ==
The journal is abstracted and indexed in Biological Abstracts, BIOSIS Previews, Essential Science Indicators and Zoological Record. BIOSIS Previews,
