= List of least concern mammals =

- Extinct in the wild (EW): 1 species
- Critically endangered (CR): 236 species
- Endangered (EN): 565 species
- Vulnerable (VU): 571 species
- Near threatened (NT): 405 species
- Least concern (LC): 3,407 species
- Data deficient (DD): 789 species
Mammalian species (IUCN, 2026.1)
- 6,054 extant species have been evaluated
- 5,328 of those are fully assessed (Note: excludes data deficient evaluations.)
- 4,682 are not threatened at present (Note: NT and LC.)
- 1,372 to 2,179 are threatened (Note: Threatened comprises CR, EN and VU. Upper estimate additionally includes DD.)
- 97 to 126 are extinct or extinct in the wild:
  - 96 extinct (EX) species (Note: Chart omits extinct (EX) species)
  - 1 extinct in the wild (EW)
  - 29 possibly extinct [CR(PE)]
  - 0 possibly extinct in the wild [CR(PEW)]

As of September 2016, the International Union for Conservation of Nature (IUCN) lists 3117 least concern mammalian species. 56% of all evaluated mammalian species are listed as least concern. The IUCN also lists 127 mammalian subspecies as least concern.

Of the subpopulations of mammals evaluated by the IUCN, one species subpopulation has been assessed as least concern.

This is a complete list of least concern mammalian species and subspecies evaluated by the IUCN. Species and subspecies which have least concern subpopulations (or stocks) are indicated. Where possible common names for taxa are given while links point to the scientific name used by the IUCN.

== Primates ==
There are 115 species and 96 subspecies of primate assessed as least concern.

=== Lemurs ===
- Reddish-gray mouse lemur
- Gray mouse lemur

=== Old World monkeys ===
Species

- Allen's swamp monkey
- Agile mangabey
- Red-tailed monkey
- Moustached guenon
- Dent's mona monkey
- Blue monkey
- De Brazza's monkey
- Grivet
- Malbrouck
- Vervet monkey
- Green monkey
- Tantalus monkey
- Mantled guereza
- Formosan rock macaque
- Japanese macaque
- Rhesus macaque
- Olive baboon
- Yellow baboon
- Hamadryas baboon
- Kinda baboon
- Chacma baboon
- Northern plains gray langur
- Black-footed gray langur
- Nepal gray langur
- Gelada

Subspecies

- Schmidt's red-tailed monkey
- Red-tailed moustached monkey
- Zanzibar Sykes's monkey
- Doggett's blue monkey
- Stairs's white-collared monkey
- Kolb's white-collared monkey
- Moloney's white-collared monkey
- Tanzania Sykes' monkey
- Rump-spotted blue monkey
- Stuhlmann's blue monkey
- Eastern putty-nosed monkey
- Western lesser spot-nosed monkey
- Eastern lesser spot-nosed monkey
- Gray's crowned monkey
- Black-footed crowned monkey
- Mt. Kilimanjaro guereza
- Omo River guereza
- Mt. Kenya guereza
- Western guereza
- Long-tailed macaque
- Macaca fuscata fuscata
- Yakushima macaque
- Pale-bellied bonnet macaque
- Dark-bellied bonnet macaque
- Central yellow baboon
- Northern yellow baboon
- Grey-footed chacma baboon
- Southern chacma baboon
- Dollman's maroon langur
- Muller's maroon langur
- Presbytis rubicunda rubida
- Southern gelada
- Ko Tarutao dusky langur
- Blond-tailed langur
- Cantor's dusky leaf monkey
- Reid's dusky langur

=== New World monkeys ===
There are 60 species and 39 subspecies of New World monkey assessed as least concern.

==== Atelids ====
Species

- Ursine howler
- Guyanan red howler
- Amazon black howler

Subspecies

- Golden-mantled howler
- Juruá red howler monkey
- Colombian red howler monkey

==== Cebids ====
Species

- White-fronted capuchin
- Black-capped squirrel monkey
- Common squirrel monkey
- Tufted capuchin
- Large-headed capuchin

Subspecies

- Colombian white-throated capuchin
- Hershkovitz' weeper capuchin
- Grey weeper capuchin
- Guianan weeper capuchin
- Bolivian squirrel monkey
- Peruvian squirrel monkey
- Humboldt's squirrel monkey
- Ecuadorian squirrel monkey
- Guianan squirrel monkey
- Sapajus apella apella

==== Pitheciids ====
Includes the titis, saki monkeys and uakaris.

- Madidi titi
- Baptista Lake titi
- Prince Bernhard's titi
- Chestnut-bellied titi
- Ashy black titi
- Coppery titi
- White-tailed titi
- White-eared titi
- Hershkovitz's titi
- Hoffmanns's titi
- Lucifer titi
- Black titi
- Red-bellied titi
- White-coated titi
- Rio Purus titi
- Red-headed titi
- Collared titi
- Red-backed bearded saki
- Equatorial saki
- Golden-faced saki
- White-faced saki

==== Callitrichids ====
Species

- White-headed marmoset
- Common marmoset
- Black-tufted marmoset
- Silvery marmoset
- Hershkovitz's marmoset
- Maués marmoset
- Satéré marmoset
- Brown-mantled tamarin
- Geoffroy's tamarin
- Emperor tamarin
- Mottle-faced tamarin
- White-lipped tamarin
- Martins's tamarin
- White-mantled tamarin
- Red-handed tamarin
- Moustached tamarin
- Black-mantled tamarin

Subspecies

- Eastern pygmy marmoset
- Western pygmy marmoset
- Ávila Pires' saddle-back tamarin
- Cruz Lima's saddle-back tamarin
- Spix's saddle-back tamarin
- Lesson's saddle-back tamarin
- Illiger's saddle-back tamarin
- Red-mantle saddle-back tamarin
- Saguinus fuscicollis leucogenys
- Geoffroy's saddle-back tamarin
- Weddell's saddle-back tamarin
- Black-chinned emperor tamarin
- Bearded emperor tamarin
- Geoffroy's red-bellied tamarin
- Gray's red-bellied tamarin
- Thomas' red-bellied tamarin
- Saguinus martinsi martinsi
- Ochraceous bare-face tamarin
- White saddleback tamarin
- Saguinus mystax mystax
- Red-cap moustached tamarin
- White-rump moustached tamarin
- Saguinus nigricollis hernandezi
- Spix's black mantle tamarin

==== Night monkeys ====
Species

- Azara's night monkey
- Black-headed night monkey
- Three-striped night monkey
- Spix's night monkey

Subspecies

- Aotus azarae azarae
- Bolivian night monkey

=== Lorisoidea ===
There are 21 species and 15 subspecies in Lorisoidea assessed as least concern.

==== Lorisids ====
Species

- Golden angwantibo
- Milne-edwards's potto
- East African potto

Subspecies

- Bosman's potto

==== Galagos ====
Species

- Southern needle-clawed bushbaby
- Somali bushbaby
- Dusky bushbaby
- Mohol bushbaby
- Senegal bushbaby
- Kenya coast galago
- Prince Demidoff's bushbaby
- Grant's bushbaby
- Thomas's bushbaby
- Brown greater galago
- Northern greater galago
- Gabon bushbaby

Subspecies

- Nigeria needle-clawed galago
- Kenya lesser galago
- Ethiopia lesser galago
- Galago senegalensis senegalensis
- Uganda lesser galago
- Udzungwa galago
- South African large-eared galago
- Tanganyika large-eared galago
- Miombo silver galago
- Zanzibar small-eared galago
- Kikuyu small-eared galago
- White-tailed small-eared galago
- Pangani small-eared galago

=== Hominidae ===
Species

- Human

== Cetartiodactyls ==
Cetartiodactyla includes dolphins, whales and even-toed ungulates. There are 118 species and 15 subspecies of cetartiodactyl assessed as least concern.

=== Non-cetacean even-toed ungulates ===
There are 96 species and 15 subspecies of non-cetacean even-toed ungulate assessed as least concern.

==== Suids ====
- Giant forest hog
- Desert warthog
- Common warthog
- Bushpig
- Red river hog
- Wild boar

==== Cervids ====
- Moose
- Chital
- Roe deer
- Siberian roe deer
- Elk
- Red deer
- Sika deer
- European fallow deer
- Gray brocket
- Amazonian brown brocket
- Indian muntjac
- Reeves's muntjac
- Northern red muntjac
- Mule deer
- White-tailed deer

Subspecies

- Sri Lankan sambar deer

==== Bovids ====
Species

- Impala
- Hartebeest
- Blackbuck
- Springbok
- Nilgai
- Alpine ibex
- Spanish ibex
- Siberian ibex
- Japanese serow
- Taiwan serow
- Peters's duiker
- Harvey's duiker
- Red forest duiker
- Black duiker
- Black-fronted duiker
- Ogilby's duiker
- Red-flanked duiker
- Weyns's duiker
- Black wildebeest
- Blue wildebeest
- Common tsessebe
- Bontebok
- Mongalla gazelle
- Chinkara
- Roan antelope
- Sable antelope
- Waterbuck
- Kob
- Lechwe
- Günther's dik-dik
- Kirk's dik-dik
- Salt's dik-dik
- Grant's gazelle
- Bates's pygmy antelope
- Royal antelope
- Suni
- Mountain goat
- Klipspringer
- Gemsbok
- Oribi
- Muskox
- Bighorn sheep
- Dall sheep
- Snow sheep
- Grey rhebok
- Maxwell's duiker
- Blue duiker
- Mongolian gazelle
- Bharal
- Steenbok
- Cape grysbok
- Sharpe's grysbok
- Southern reedbuck
- Mountain reedbuck
- Bohor reedbuck
- Pyrenean chamois
- Chamois
- Common duiker
- Nyala
- Common eland
- Bushbuck
- Sitatunga
- Greater kudu

Subspecies

- Aepyceros melampus melampus
- Red hartebeest
- Coke's hartebeest
- Lichtenstein's hartebeest
- Damaliscus lunatus lunatus
- Bangweulu tsessebe
- Damaliscus lunatus tiang
- Blesbok
- Common waterbuck
- White-eared kob
- Ugandan kob
- Red lechwe
- Southern mountain reedbuck
- Eastern giant eland

==== Chevrotains ====
- Water chevrotain
- Indian spotted chevrotain
- Yellow-striped chevrotain
- Sri Lankan spotted chevrotain
- Lesser mouse-deer
- Greater mouse-deer

==== Other non-cetacean even-toed ungulate species ====
- Pronghorn
- Guanaco
- Collared peccary
- Vicuña

=== Cetaceans ===
- Bowhead whale
- Common minke whale
- Arnoux's beaked whale
- Baird's beaked whale
- Short-beaked common dolphin
- Gray whale
- Southern right whale
- Risso's dolphin
- Southern bottlenose whale
- Dwarf sperm whale
- Fraser's dolphin
- Atlantic white-sided dolphin
- White-beaked dolphin
- Hourglass dolphin
- Pacific white-sided dolphin
- Northern right whale dolphin
- Humpback whale
- Blainville's beaked whale
- Gervais's beaked whale
- Gray's beaked whale
- Strap-toothed beaked whale
- True's beaked whale
- Pygmy beaked whale
- Melon-headed whale
- Spectacled porpoise
- Harbour porpoise
- Dall's porpoise
- Pantropical spotted dolphin
- Striped dolphin
- Rough-toothed dolphin
- Common bottlenose dolphin
- Cuvier's beaked whale
- Beluga whale

== Marsupials ==
There are 192 marsupial species assessed as least concern.

=== Peramelemorphia ===
- Clara's echymipera
- Common echymipera
- Long-nosed echymipera
- Golden bandicoot
- Northern brown bandicoot
- Southern brown bandicoot
- Striped bandicoot
- Papuan bandicoot
- Long-nosed bandicoot
- Raffray's bandicoot

=== Diprotodontia ===
There are 65 species in the order Diprotodontia assessed as least concern.

==== Macropodids ====
- White-striped dorcopsis
- Brown dorcopsis
- Macleay's dorcopsis
- Spectacled hare-wallaby
- Agile wallaby
- Antilopine kangaroo
- Black-striped wallaby
- Tammar wallaby
- Western grey kangaroo
- Eastern grey kangaroo
- Western brush wallaby
- Whiptail wallaby
- Common wallaroo
- Red-necked wallaby
- Red kangaroo
- Northern nail-tail wallaby
- Allied rock-wallaby
- Short-eared rock-wallaby
- Herbert's rock-wallaby
- Unadorned rock-wallaby
- Rothschild's rock-wallaby
- Tasmanian pademelon
- Red-legged pademelon
- Red-necked pademelon
- Swamp wallaby

==== Petaurids ====
- Long-fingered triok
- Great-tailed triok
- Striped possum
- Biak glider
- Sugar glider
- Squirrel glider

==== Phalangerids ====
- Mountain cuscus
- Ground cuscus
- Eastern common cuscus
- Southern common cuscus
- Northern common cuscus
- Ornate cuscus
- Rothschild's cuscus
- Silky cuscus
- Stein's cuscus
- Common spotted cuscus
- Banggai cuscus
- Short-eared possum
- Mountain brushtail possum
- Common brushtail possum

==== Pseudocheirids ====
- Rock-haunting ringtail possum
- Common ringtail possum
- Green ringtail possum
- Coppery ringtail possum
- Lowland ringtail possum
- Weyland ringtail possum
- Painted ringtail possum
- Herbert River ringtail possum
- Masked ringtail possum
- Pygmy ringtail possum

==== Other Diprotodontia species ====
- Feathertail glider
- Rufous rat-kangaroo
- Long-tailed pygmy possum
- Southwestern pygmy possum
- Tasmanian pygmy possum
- Eastern pygmy possum
- Feather-tailed possum
- Musky rat-kangaroo
- Southern hairy-nosed wombat
- Honey possum
- Common wombat

=== Shrew opossums ===
- Dusky caenolestid
- Incan caenolestid

=== Dasyuromorphia ===
- Kultarr
- Tropical antechinus
- Agile antechinus
- Yellow-footed antechinus
- Cinnamon antechinus
- Swamp antechinus
- Brown antechinus
- Subtropical antechinus
- Dusky antechinus
- Brush-tailed mulgara
- Little red kaluta
- Habbema dasyure
- Short-furred dasyure
- Black-tailed dasyure
- Long-nosed dasyure
- Three-striped dasyure
- Wallace's three-striped dasyure
- Speckled dasyure
- Wongai ningaui
- Pilbara ningaui
- Southern ningaui
- Red-bellied marsupial shrew
- Narrow-striped marsupial shrew
- Paucident planigale
- Long-tailed planigale
- Common planigale
- New Guinean planigale
- Narrow-nosed planigale
- Fat-tailed false antechinus
- Ningbing false antechinus
- Rory Cooper's false antechinus
- Woolley's false antechinus
- Fat-tailed dunnart
- Little long-tailed dunnart
- Sooty dunnart
- Gilbert's dunnart
- White-tailed dunnart
- Grey-bellied dunnart
- Hairy-footed dunnart
- White-footed dunnart
- Long-tailed dunnart
- Stripe-faced dunnart
- Slender-tailed dunnart
- Ooldea dunnart
- Red-cheeked dunnart
- Lesser hairy-footed dunnart

=== Opossums ===
- Derby's woolly opossum
- Brown-eared woolly opossum
- Bare-tailed woolly opossum
- Black-shouldered opossum
- Water opossum
- Chacoan gracile opossum
- White-eared opossum
- Big-eared opossum
- Guianan white-eared opossum
- Common opossum
- Andean white-eared opossum
- Virginia opossum
- Bushy-tailed opossum
- Aceramarca gracile opossum
- Agile gracile opossum
- Wood sprite gracile opossum
- Northern gracile opossum
- Brazilian gracile opossum
- Kalinowski's mouse opossum
- Patagonian opossum
- Lutrine opossum
- Massoia's lutrine opossum
- Alston's mouse opossum
- White-bellied woolly mouse opossum
- Woolly mouse opossum
- Rufous mouse opossum
- Mexican mouse opossum
- Linnaeus's mouse opossum
- Tate's woolly mouse opossum
- Quechuan mouse opossum
- Bare-tailed woolly mouse opossum
- Robinson's mouse opossum
- Bishop's slender opossum
- Tschudi's slender opossum
- Gray slender opossum
- Panama slender opossum
- Neblina slender opossum
- White-bellied slender opossum
- Dorothy's slender opossum
- Delicate slender opossum
- Brazilian slender opossum
- Pinheiro's slender opossum
- Brown four-eyed opossum
- Sepia short-tailed opossum
- Northern three-striped opossum
- Northern red-sided opossum
- Yellow-sided opossum
- Gray short-tailed opossum
- Emilia's short-tailed opossum
- Amazonian red-sided opossum
- Pygmy short-tailed opossum
- Osgood's short-tailed opossum
- Hooded red-sided opossum
- Ronald's opossum
- Long-nosed short-tailed opossum
- Anderson's four-eyed opossum
- Deltaic four-eyed opossum
- Southeastern four-eyed opossum
- McIlhenny's four-eyed opossum
- Mondolfi's four-eyed opossum
- Gray four-eyed opossum
- Cinderella fat-tailed mouse opossum
- Thylamys citellus
- Elegant fat-tailed mouse opossum
- White-bellied fat-tailed mouse opossum
- Thylamys pulchellus
- Common fat-tailed mouse opossum
- Argentine fat-tailed mouse opossum
- Grayish mouse opossum

=== Marsupial moles ===
- Northern marsupial mole
- Southern marsupial mole

== Carnivora ==
There are 173 species, 14 subspecies, and one subpopulation in the order Carnivora assessed as least concern.

=== Felids ===
- Caracal
- Kodkod
- Jungle cat
- Sand cat
- Wildcat
- Geoffroy's cat
- Ocelot
- Serval
- Canada lynx
- Eurasian lynx
- Bobcat
- Leopard cat
- Cougar
- Pallas's cat

=== Eared seals ===
Species

- South American fur seal
- New Zealand fur seal
- Antarctic fur seal
- Juan Fernández fur seal
- Brown fur seal
- Guadalupe fur seal
- Subantarctic fur seal
- South American sea lion
- California sea lion

Subspecies

- Arctocephalus australis australis
- Tasmanian fur seal
- Cape fur seal
- Loughlin's steller sea lion

=== Viverrids ===
- Small-toothed palm civet
- African civet
- Angolan genet
- Common genet
- Rusty-spotted genet
- Pardine genet
- Servaline genet
- Haussa genet
- Cape genet
- Giant forest genet
- Masked palm civet
- Asian palm civet
- Brown palm civet
- Golden palm civet
- African linsang
- Malayan civet
- Large Indian civet
- Small Indian civet

=== Earless seals ===
Species

- Grey seal
- Ribbon seal
- Leopard seal
- Weddell seal
- Crabeater seal
- Northern elephant seal
- Southern elephant seal
- Ross seal
- Spotted seal
- Harbor seal
- Ringed seal
- Baikal seal

Subspecies

- Atlantic bearded seal
- Pacific bearded seal
- Northwest Atlantic grey seal
- Northeast Atlantic grey seal
- Western Atlantic harbor seal
- North Pacific harbor seal
- Eastern Atlantic harbour seal
- Baltic ringed seal
- Arctic ringed seal
- Okhotsk Sea ringed seal

Subpopulations

- Grey seal (1 subpopulation)

=== Canids ===
- Side-striped jackal
- Golden jackal
- Coyote
- Gray wolf
- Black-backed jackal
- Crab-eating fox
- Culpeo
- South American gray fox
- Pampas fox
- Hoary fox
- Raccoon dog
- Bat-eared fox
- Gray fox
- Bengal fox
- Blanford's fox
- Cape fox
- Corsac fox
- Tibetan sand fox
- Arctic fox
- Kit fox
- Pale fox
- Rüppell's fox
- Swift fox
- Red fox
- Fennec fox

Subspecies

- Eurasian wolf

=== Mustelids ===
- Northern hog badger
- Sumatran hog badger
- Tayra
- Lesser grison
- Greater grison
- Wolverine
- Saharan striped polecat
- Striped polecat
- North American river otter
- Patagonian weasel
- American marten
- Yellow-throated marten
- Beech marten
- European pine marten
- Japanese marten
- Fisher
- Sable
- Japanese badger
- Asian badger
- European badger
- Honey badger
- Chinese ferret-badger
- Javan ferret-badger
- Burmese ferret-badger
- Amazon weasel
- Stoat
- Steppe polecat
- Long-tailed weasel
- Yellow-bellied weasel
- Indonesian mountain weasel
- Least weasel
- Malayan weasel
- European polecat
- Siberian weasel
- Back-striped weasel
- Egyptian weasel
- American mink
- African striped weasel
- American badger

=== Procyonids ===
- Eastern lowland olingo
- Northern olingo
- Western lowland olingo
- Ring-tailed cat
- Cacomistle
- White-nosed coati
- South American coati
- Kinkajou
- Crab-eating raccoon
- Raccoon

=== Skunks ===
- Molina's hog-nosed skunk
- Humboldt's hog-nosed skunk
- American hog-nosed skunk
- Striped hog-nosed skunk
- Hooded skunk
- Striped skunk
- Sunda stink badger
- Palawan stink badger
- Southern spotted skunk
- Western spotted skunk

=== Mongooses ===
- Marsh mongoose
- Bushy-tailed mongoose
- Black-footed mongoose
- Alexander's kusimanse
- Angolan kusimanse
- Common kusimanse
- Flat-headed kusimanse
- Yellow mongoose
- Ethiopian dwarf mongoose
- Common dwarf mongoose
- Small Indian mongoose
- Indian gray mongoose
- Kaokoveld slender mongoose
- Indian brown mongoose
- Egyptian mongoose
- Small Asian mongoose
- Long-nosed mongoose
- Somali slender mongoose
- Cape gray mongoose
- Slender mongoose
- Ruddy mongoose
- Crab-eating mongoose
- Stripe-necked mongoose
- White-tailed mongoose
- Gambian mongoose
- Banded mongoose
- Selous' mongoose
- Meller's mongoose
- Meerkat

=== Other Carnivora species ===
- Aardwolf (Proteles cristata)
- African palm civet (Nandinia binotata)
- American black bear (Ursus americanus)
- Banded linsang (Prionodon linsang)
- Brown bear (Ursus arctos)
- Ring-tailed vontsira (Galidia elegans)
- Spotted hyena (Crocuta crocuta)
- Spotted linsang (Prionodon pardicolor)

Subspecies

- ABC Islands bear (Ursus arctos sitkensis)

== Afrosoricida ==
Afrosoricida includes tenrecs and golden moles. There are 32 species in the order Afrosoricida assessed as least concern.

=== Golden moles ===
- Hottentot golden mole
- Yellow golden mole
- Sclater's golden mole
- Cape golden mole
- Stuhlmann's golden mole
- Grant's golden mole

=== Tenrecs ===
- Lesser hedgehog tenrec
- Large-eared tenrec
- Highland streaked tenrec
- Lowland streaked tenrec
- Short-tailed shrew tenrec
- Cowan's shrew tenrec
- Dobson's shrew tenrec
- Drouhard's shrew tenrec
- Pale shrew tenrec
- Gracile shrew tenrec
- Grandidier's shrew tenrec
- Naked-nosed shrew tenrec
- Lesser long-tailed shrew tenrec
- Major's long-tailed tenrec
- Pygmy shrew tenrec
- Greater long-tailed shrew tenrec
- Least shrew tenrec
- Shrew-toothed shrew tenrec
- Taiva shrew tenrec
- Talazac's shrew tenrec
- Thomas's shrew tenrec
- Ruwenzori otter shrew
- Mole-like rice tenrec
- Giant otter shrew
- Greater hedgehog tenrec
- Tailless tenrec

== Pilosa ==
Anteaters and sloths

- Pale-throated sloth
- Brown-throated sloth
- Linnaeus's two-toed sloth
- Hoffmann's two-toed sloth
- Silky anteater
- Northern tamandua
- Southern tamandua

== Eulipotyphla ==
There are 270 species in the order Eulipotyphla assessed as least concern.

=== Solenodontidae ===
- Hispaniolan solenodon

=== Shrews ===
- Assam mole shrew
- Chinese mole shrew
- Taiwanese mole shrew
- Northern short-tailed shrew
- Southern short-tailed shrew
- Elliot's short-tailed shrew
- Indochinese short-tailed shrew
- Burmese short-tailed shrew
- Himalayan water shrew
- Japanese water shrew
- Chinese water shrew
- De Winton's shrew
- Lamulate shrew
- Lowe's shrew
- Lesser Congo shrew
- Cyrenaica shrew
- East African highland shrew
- Arabian shrew
- Jackass shrew
- Asian gray shrew
- Hun shrew
- Kinabalu shrew
- Bates's shrew
- Mindanao shrew
- Beccari's shrew
- Thick-tailed shrew
- Buettikofer's shrew
- African dusky shrew
- Cinderella shrew
- Congo white-toothed shrew
- Long-footed shrew
- Crosse's shrew
- Reddish-gray musk shrew
- Dent's shrew
- Long-tailed musk shrew
- Doucet's musk shrew
- Dsinezumi shrew
- Elgon shrew
- Elongated shrew
- Greater red musk shrew
- Bornean shrew
- Fox's shrew
- Southeast Asian shrew
- Savanna shrew
- Smoky white-toothed shrew
- Bicolored musk shrew
- Gmelin's white-toothed shrew
- Goliath shrew
- Large-headed white-toothed shrew
- Grasse's shrew
- Luzon shrew
- Greenwood's shrew
- Hildegarde's shrew
- Lesser red musk shrew
- Hutan shrew
- Indochinese shrew
- Jackson's shrew
- Jouvenet's shrew
- Ke Go white-toothed shrew
- Lamotte's shrew
- Ussuri white-toothed shrew
- Latona's shrew
- Sulawesi shrew
- Sumatran giant shrew
- Bicolored shrew
- Sulawesi tiny shrew
- Butiaba naked-tailed shrew
- Ludia's shrew
- Moonshine shrew
- Mauritanian shrew
- MacArthur's shrew
- Malayan shrew
- Makwassie musk shrew
- Swamp musk shrew
- Gracile naked-tailed shrew
- Javanese shrew
- Sunda shrew
- Montane white-toothed shrew
- West African long-tailed shrew
- Somali dwarf shrew
- Savanna dwarf shrew
- Peninsular shrew
- Nigerian shrew
- Blackish white-toothed shrew
- Black-footed shrew
- African black shrew
- Niobe's shrew
- West African pygmy shrew
- African giant shrew
- North African white-toothed shrew
- Palawan shrew
- Sumatran long-tailed shrew
- Small-footed shrew
- Sahelian tiny shrew
- Crocidura phanluongi
- Fraser's musk shrew
- Negev shrew
- Sulawesi white-handed shrew
- Roosevelt's shrew
- Greater white-toothed shrew
- Lesser rock shrew
- Asian lesser white-toothed shrew
- Siberian shrew
- Sicilian shrew
- Lesser gray-brown musk shrew
- Desert musk shrew
- Somali shrew
- Lesser white-toothed shrew
- Taiwanese gray shrew
- Thalia's shrew
- Therese's shrew
- Turbo shrew
- Savanna path shrew
- Mamfe shrew
- Voi shrew
- Voracious shrew
- Lesser Ryukyu shrew
- Whitaker's shrew
- Xanthippe's shrew
- Yankari shrew
- Zarudny's rock shrew
- Colombian small-eared shrew
- Ecuadorean small-eared shrew
- Goldman's broad-clawed shrew
- Goodwin's broad-clawed shrew
- Yucatan small-eared shrew
- Medellín small-eared shrew
- Merida small-eared shrew
- Merriam's small-eared shrew
- Mexican small-eared shrew
- Wandering small-eared shrew
- Blackish small-eared shrew
- Grizzled Mexican small-eared shrew
- North American least shrew
- Scaly-footed small-eared shrew
- Tamá small-eared shrew
- Thomas' small-eared shrew
- Piebald shrew
- Hodgsons's brown-toothed shrew
- Taiwanese brown-toothed shrew
- Long-tailed brown-toothed shrew
- Long-tailed mountain shrew
- Mexican shrew
- Babault's mouse shrew
- Dark-footed mouse shrew
- Forest shrew
- Kilimanjaro mouse shrew
- Elegant water shrew
- Mediterranean water shrew
- Eurasian water shrew
- Transcaucasian water shrew
- Cockrum's grey shrew
- Crawford's gray shrew
- Large-eared gray shrew
- Greater large-headed shrew
- Lesser large-headed shrew
- Hero shrew
- Valais shrew
- Common shrew
- Arctic shrew
- Arizona shrew
- Tien Shan shrew
- Baird's shrew
- Lesser striped shrew
- Marsh shrew
- Buchara shrew
- Laxmann's shrew
- Kamchatka shrew
- Cinereus shrew
- Crowned shrew
- Greater stripe-backed shrew
- Siberian large-toothed shrew
- Long-tailed shrew
- Zacatecas shrew
- Chinese highland shrew
- Smoky shrew
- Slender shrew
- Iberian shrew
- Prairie shrew
- Azumi shrew
- American pygmy shrew
- Taiga shrew
- Saint Lawrence Island shrew
- Southeastern shrew
- Mount Lyell shrew
- Maritime shrew
- Jalisco shrew
- Merriam's shrew
- Eurasian least shrew
- Eurasian pygmy shrew
- Montane shrew
- Dwarf shrew
- Mexican long-tailed shrew
- Orizaba long-tailed shrew
- Ornate shrew
- Pacific shrew
- American water shrew
- Kashmir pygmy shrew
- Preble's shrew
- Radde's shrew
- Flat-skulled shrew
- Olympic shrew
- Apennine shrew
- Caucasian shrew
- Saussure's shrew
- Shinto shrew
- Fog shrew
- Inyo shrew
- Trowbridge's shrew
- Tundra shrew
- Barren ground shrew
- Long-clawed shrew
- Vagrant shrew
- Chestnut-bellied shrew
- Veracruz shrew
- Verapaz shrew
- Caucasian pygmy shrew
- Alaska tiny shrew
- Himalayan shrew
- Etruscan shrew
- Hutu-Tutsi dwarf shrew
- Least dwarf shrew
- Greater dwarf shrew
- Madagascan pygmy shrew
- Malayan pygmy shrew
- Climbing shrew
- Asian highland shrew
- Asian house shrew
- Remy's pygmy shrew
- Anderson's shrew
- Lesser dwarf shrew
- Aberdare mole shrew
- Grant's forest shrew
- Johnston's forest shrew
- Greater forest shrew
- Volcano shrew

=== Erinaceids ===
- Four-toed hedgehog
- North African hedgehog
- Southern African hedgehog
- Somali hedgehog
- Moonrat
- Amur hedgehog
- Southern white-breasted hedgehog
- Northern white-breasted hedgehog
- Long-eared hedgehog
- Indian long-eared hedgehog
- Short-tailed gymnure
- Daurian hedgehog
- Hugh's hedgehog
- Shrew gymnure
- Desert hedgehog
- Brandt's hedgehog
- Indian hedgehog
- Bare-bellied hedgehog
- Mindanao gymnure

=== Talpids ===
- Star-nosed mole
- True's shrew mole
- Greater Chinese mole
- Kloss's mole
- Long-nosed mole
- Himalayan mole
- Japanese mountain mole
- Vietnamese mole
- Small Japanese mole
- Insular mole
- Large mole
- Japanese mole
- American shrew mole
- Hairy-tailed mole
- White-tailed mole
- Eastern mole
- Gansu mole
- Broad-footed mole
- Coast mole
- Townsend's mole
- Short-faced mole
- Long-tailed mole
- Altai mole
- Blind mole
- Caucasian mole
- European mole
- Levant mole
- Spanish mole
- Roman mole
- Balkan mole
- Gracile shrew mole
- Chinese shrew mole
- Japanese shrew mole

== Lagomorpha ==
Lagomorpha comprises rabbits and relatives. There are 59 species in the order Lagomorpha assessed as least concern.

=== Leporids ===
- Pygmy rabbit
- Antelope jackrabbit
- Snowshoe hare
- Arctic hare
- Japanese hare
- Black-tailed jackrabbit
- Cape hare
- Yunnan hare
- Korean hare
- European hare
- Ethiopian hare
- Granada hare
- Abyssinian hare
- Manchurian hare
- Indian hare
- Woolly hare
- Alaskan hare
- Burmese hare
- Scrub hare
- Chinese hare
- Ethiopian highland hare
- Desert hare
- Mountain hare
- Tolai hare
- White-tailed jackrabbit
- African savanna hare
- Bunyoro rabbit
- Natal red rock hare
- Jameson's red rock hare
- Smith's red rock hare
- Hewitt's red rock hare
- Swamp rabbit
- Desert cottontail
- Brush rabbit
- Mexican cottontail
- Eastern cottontail
- Mountain cottontail
- Marsh rabbit

=== Pikas ===
- Alpine pika
- Gansu pika
- Collared pika
- Plateau pika
- Daurian pika
- Chinese red pika
- Forrest's pika
- Glover's pika
- Northern pika
- Ladak pika
- Large-eared pika
- Nubra pika
- Pallas's pika
- American pika
- Steppe pika
- Royle's pika
- Afghan pika
- Turkestan red pika
- Moupin pika
- Thomas's pika
- Turuchan pika

== Rodents ==
There are 1399 species and two subspecies of rodent assessed as least concern.

=== Hystricomorpha ===
There are 132 species in Hystricomorpha assessed as least concern.

==== Octodontids ====
- Chilean rock rat
- Degu
- Mountain degu
- Viscacha rat
- Coruro

==== Tuco-tucos ====
- Bolivian tuco-tuco
- Conover's tuco-tuco
- Reddish tuco-tuco
- Tawny tuco-tuco
- Goodfellow's tuco-tuco
- Haig's tuco-tuco
- White-toothed tuco-tuco
- Lewis's tuco-tuco
- Magellanic tuco-tuco
- Maule tuco-tuco
- Mendoza tuco-tuco
- Highland tuco-tuco
- Goya tuco-tuco
- Peruvian tuco-tuco
- Steinbach's tuco-tuco
- Talas tuco-tuco
- Collared tuco-tuco

==== Dasyproctids ====
- Black agouti
- Red-rumped agouti
- Black-rumped agouti
- Central American agouti
- Red acouchi
- Green acouchi

==== Neotropical spiny rat species ====
- Broad-headed spiny rat
- Bolivian bamboo rat
- Amazon bamboo rat
- Rufous soft-furred spiny rat
- White-faced spiny tree-rat
- Fischer's guiara
- Armored rat
- Yellow-crowned brush-tailed rat
- Rio Negro brush-tailed rat
- Plain brush-tailed rat
- Sinnamary brush-tailed rat
- Atlantic bamboo rat
- Tuft-tailed spiny tree rat
- Brazilian spiny tree-rat
- Long-tailed armored tree-rat
- Ferreira's spiny tree rat
- Tufted-tailed spiny tree-rat
- Pará spiny tree-rat
- Speckled spiny tree-rat
- Golden Atlantic tree-rat
- Drab Atlantic tree-rat
- Long-furred Atlantic tree-rat
- Black-spined Atlantic tree-rat
- Rusty-sided Atlantic tree-rat
- Hispaniolan hutia
- Short-tailed spiny rat
- Colombian spiny rat
- Cuvier's spiny rat
- Stiff-spine spiny rat
- Goeldi's spiny rat
- Guaira spiny rat
- Guyenne spiny rat
- Long-tailed spiny rat
- Patton's spiny rat
- Napo spiny rat
- Roberto's spiny rat
- Tome's spiny rat
- Simon's spiny rat
- Steere's spiny rat
- Common punaré
- Highlands punaré
- Paraguayan punaré
- Giant tree rat
- White-spined Atlantic spiny rat
- Soft-spined Atlantic spiny rat
- Gracile Atlantic spiny rat
- Ihering's Atlantic spiny rat
- Hairy Atlantic spiny rat

==== Caviids ====
- Brazilian guinea pig
- Shiny guinea pig
- Greater guinea pig
- Montane guinea pig
- Chacoan mara
- Brazilian yellow-toothed cavy
- Lowland yellow-toothed cavy
- Spix's yellow-toothed cavy
- Capybara
- Rock cavy
- Southern mountain cavy
- Andean mountain cavy

==== Blesmols ====
- Namaqua dune mole-rat
- Cape dune mole-rat
- Common mole-rat
- Bocage's mole-rat
- Damaraland mole-rat
- Mashona mole-rat
- Mechow's mole rat
- Ochre mole-rat
- Ghana mole-rat
- Cape mole-rat
- Silvery mole-rat
- Naked mole-rat

==== New World porcupines ====
- Bicolored-spined porcupine
- Bahia porcupine
- Black-tailed hairy dwarf porcupine
- Mexican hairy dwarf porcupine
- Brazilian porcupine
- Frosted hairy dwarf porcupine
- Stump-tailed porcupine
- Paraguaian hairy dwarf porcupine
- North American porcupine

==== Old World porcupines ====
- African brush-tailed porcupine
- Asiatic brush-tailed porcupine
- Cape porcupine
- Malayan porcupine
- Thick-spined porcupine
- Crested porcupine
- Indian crested porcupine
- Sunda porcupine
- Sumatran porcupine
- Long-tailed porcupine

==== Other Hystricomorpha species ====
- Bennett's chinchilla rat
- Ashy chinchilla rat
- Sierra del Tontal chinchilla rat
- Desmarest's hutia
- Common gundi
- Lowland paca
- Pacarana
- Felou gundi
- Southern viscacha
- Plains viscacha
- Laotian rock rat
- Mzab gundi
- Coypu
- Speke's pectinator
- Dassie rat
- Lesser cane rat
- Greater cane rat

=== Myomorpha ===
There are 981 species in Myomorpha assessed as least concern.

==== Platacanthomyids ====
- Chinese pygmy dormouse

==== Murids ====
Includes mice, rats, gerbils, and relatives.

- Highland brush mouse
- Western Saharan spiny mouse
- Cairo spiny mouse
- Gray spiny mouse
- Eastern spiny mouse
- Fiery spiny mouse
- Johan's spiny mouse
- Kemp's spiny mouse
- Louise's spiny mouse
- Mullah spiny mouse
- Percival's spiny mouse
- Golden spiny mouse
- Seurat's spiny mouse
- Southern African spiny mouse
- Cape spiny mouse
- Wilson's spiny mouse
- Bocage's rock rat
- Red rock rat
- Grant's rock mouse
- Hinde's rock rat
- Tete veld aethomys
- Kaiser's rock rat
- Namaqua rock rat
- Nyika rock rat
- Thomas's rock rat
- Squirrel-toothed rat
- Striped field mouse
- Alpine field mouse
- Small Japanese field mouse
- Chevrier's field mouse
- South China field mouse
- Western broad-toothed field mouse
- Yellow-necked mouse
- Luzon Cordillera forest mouse
- Large Mindoro forest mouse
- Himalayan field mouse
- Sichuan field mouse
- Broad-toothed field mouse
- Ward's field mouse
- Korean field mouse
- Black Sea field mouse
- Kashmir field mouse
- Long-nosed Luzon forest mouse
- Taiwan field mouse
- Large Japanese field mouse
- Wood mouse
- Ural field mouse
- Steppe field mouse
- Luzon montane forest mouse
- Mount Apo forest mouse
- Mindanao montane forest mouse
- Small Luzon forest mouse
- Least forest mouse
- Abyssinian grass rat
- Sudanian grass rat
- Nairobi grass rat
- Neumann's grass rat
- African grass rat
- Guinean grass rat
- Shaw Mayer's water rat
- Lesser bandicoot rat
- Greater bandicoot rat
- Savile's bandicoot rat
- Mindanao hairy-tailed rat
- Small white-toothed rat
- Bower's white-toothed rat
- Przewalski's gerbil
- Bagobo rat
- Large Luzon forest rat
- Andrew's hill rat
- Yellow-haired hill rat
- White-bellied Luzon tree rat
- Fea's tree-rat
- Indomalayan pencil-tailed tree mouse
- Greater tree mouse
- Lamia
- Lesser tree-mouse
- Blazed Luzon shrew rat
- Luzon striped rat
- Rümmler's brush mouse
- African wading rat
- Cutch rat
- Earless water rat
- Mindanao shrew rat
- African marsh rat
- West African shaggy rat
- Link rat
- Defua rat
- Pouched gerbil
- Cape short-eared gerbil
- Harrington's rat
- Sulawesi soft-furred rat
- Cape gerbil
- Boehm's gerbil
- Highveld gerbil
- Gerbilliscus gambiana
- Guinean gerbil
- Gorongoza gerbil
- Kemp's gerbil
- Bushveld gerbil
- Black-tailed gerbil
- Phillips's gerbil
- Fringe-tailed gerbil
- Savanna gerbil
- Hairy-footed gerbil
- Namib brush-tailed gerbil
- Dune hairy-footed gerbil
- Bushy-tailed hairy-footed gerbil
- Pleasant gerbil
- Anderson's gerbil
- Swarthy gerbil
- North African gerbil
- Cheesman's gerbil
- Wagner's gerbil
- Somalia gerbil
- Black-tufted gerbil
- Flower's gerbil
- Lesser gerbil
- Indian hairy-footed gerbil
- Harwood's gerbil
- Pygmy gerbil
- Julian's gerbil (Gerbillus juliani)
- Lataste's gerbil
- Mackilligin's gerbil
- Greater short-tailed gerbil
- Harrison's gerbil
- Balochistan gerbil
- Nigerian gerbil
- Pale gerbil
- Large Aden gerbil
- Cushioned gerbil
- Least gerbil
- Greater Egyptian gerbil
- Rosalinda gerbil
- Rupicolous gerbil
- Lesser short-tailed gerbil
- Tarabul's gerbil
- Waters's gerbil
- Indian bush rat
- Mozambique thicket rat
- Woodland thicket rat
- Ruwenzori thicket rat
- Eastern rainforest grammomys
- Macmillan's thicket rat
- Selous thicket rat
- African smoky mouse
- Miller's striped mouse
- Temminck's striped mouse
- Peters' striped mouse
- Rakali
- Beaded wood mouse
- Allen's wood mouse
- Angolan wood mouse
- Montane wood mouse
- Little wood mouse
- Stella wood mouse
- Eastern white-eared giant rat
- Forrest's mouse
- Lakeland Downs mouse
- Barbary striped grass mouse
- Bellier's striped grass mouse
- Griselda's striped grass mouse
- Senegal one-striped grass mouse
- Buffoon striped grass mouse
- Mittendorf's striped grass mouse
- Single-striped grass mouse
- Typical striped grass mouse
- Heuglin's striped grass mouse
- Trefoil-toothed giant rat
- Gray tree rat
- Sundaic mountain leopoldamys
- Edwards's long-tailed giant rat
- Millet's leopoldamys
- Neill's long-tailed giant rat
- Long-tailed giant rat
- Long-footed water rat
- Ernst Mayr's water rat
- Fly River water rat
- Gray-bellied mountain rat
- Mindanao mountain rat
- Ethiopian forest brush-furred rat
- Yellow-spotted brush-furred rat
- Hutterer's brush-furred mouse
- Yellow-bellied brush-furred rat
- Fire-bellied brush-furred rat
- Mount Cameroon brush-furred rat
- Rusty-bellied brush-furred rat
- Woosnam's brush-furred rat
- New Guinean jumping mouse
- Eastern small-toothed rat
- Blanford's rat
- Cansdale's swamp rat
- Edward's swamp rat
- Big-eared swamp rat
- De Vis's woolly rat
- Subalpine woolly rat
- Rothschild's woolly rat
- Large-scaled mosaic-tailed rat
- Large mosaic-tailed rat
- Awash multimammate mouse
- Southern multimammate mouse
- Guinea multimammate mouse
- Hubert's multimammate mouse
- Verheyen's multimammate mouse
- Natal multimammate mouse
- Shortridge's multimammate mouse
- Mountain spiny rat
- Bartels's spiny rat
- Hellwald's spiny rat
- Malayan mountain spiny rat
- Mo's spiny rat
- Musschenbroek's spiny rat
- Palawan spiny rat
- Red spiny rat
- Maxomys tajuddinii
- Grassland mosaic-tailed rat
- Cape York melomys
- Fawn-footed mosaic-tailed rat
- Dollman's melomys
- Snow Mountains grassland mosaic-tailed rat
- White-bellied mosaic-tailed rat
- Papua grassland mosaic-tailed rat
- Obi mosaic-tailed rat
- Black-tailed mosaic-tailed rat
- Arabian jird
- Cheng's jird
- Sundevall's jird
- Moroccan jird
- Indian desert jird
- Libyan jird
- Midday jird
- Persian jird
- King jird
- Shaw's jird
- Tamarisk jird
- Tristram's jird
- Mongolian gerbil
- Vinogradov's jird
- Golden-backed tree-rat
- Somali pygmy gerbil
- Eurasian harvest mouse
- Sand-colored soft-furred rat
- Miss Ryley's soft-furred rat
- Soft-furred rat
- Ethiopian striped mouse
- Baoule's mouse
- Little Indian field mouse
- Toad mouse
- Callewaert's mouse
- Ryukyu mouse
- Fawn-colored mouse
- Cook's mouse
- Cypriot mouse
- Sheath-tailed mouse
- Hausa mouse
- Desert pygmy mouse
- Macedonian mouse
- Mahomet mouse
- Matthey's mouse
- African pygmy mouse
- Temminck's mouse
- House mouse
- Free State pygmy mouse
- Gairdner's shrewmouse
- Phillips's mouse
- Flat-haired mouse
- Rock-loving mouse
- Peters's mouse
- Setzer's pygmy mouse
- Shortridge's mouse
- Thomas's pygmy mouse
- Steppe mouse
- Algerian mouse
- Delicate mouse
- Earth-colored mouse
- Gray-bellied pygmy mouse
- Volcano mouse
- African groove-toothed rat
- Angolan multimammate mouse
- Brockman's rock mouse
- Verreaux's mouse
- Yemeni mouse
- Short-tailed bandicoot rat
- Anderson's white-bellied rat
- Brahma white-bellied rat
- Chinese white-bellied rat
- Coxing's white-bellied rat
- Dark-tailed tree rat
- Smoke-bellied rat
- Large white-bellied rat
- Montane Sumatran white-bellied rat
- Chestnut white-bellied rat
- Lang Bian white-bellied rat
- Narrow-tailed white-bellied rat
- White-bellied rat
- Long-tailed mountain rat
- Tenasserim white-bellied rat
- Spinifex hopping mouse
- Mitchell's hopping mouse
- Common rufous-nosed rat
- Ghana rufous-nosed rat
- Angolan vlei rat
- Angoni vlei rat
- Cuanza vlei rat
- Dent's vlei rat
- Southern African vlei rat
- Tanzanian vlei rat
- Laminate vlei rat
- Saunder's vlei rat
- Sloggett's vlei rat
- Tropical vlei rat
- Typical vlei rat
- Bush vlei rat
- Fat-tailed gerbil
- New Guinea waterside rat
- Long-nosed mosaic-tailed rat
- Lorentz's mosaic-tailed rat
- Thomas's mosaic-tailed rat
- Moncton's mosaic-tailed rat
- Long-nosed paramelomys
- Lowland mosaic-tailed rat
- Mountain mosaic-tailed rat
- Brants's whistling rat
- Littledale's whistling rat
- Sulawesi giant rat
- Bell groove-toothed swamp rat
- Creek groove-toothed swamp rat
- Least groove-toothed swamp rat
- Southern giant slender-tailed cloud rat
- Northern Luzon giant cloud rat
- Grey pogonomelomys
- Shaw Mayer's brush mouse
- Large tree mouse
- Chestnut tree mouse
- Gray-bellied tree mouse
- Dalton's mouse
- De Graaff's soft-furred mouse
- Delectable soft-furred mouse
- Deroo's mouse
- Jackson's soft-furred mouse
- Lukolela swamp rat
- Least soft-furred mouse
- Misonne's soft-furred mouse
- Petter's soft-furred mouse
- Forest soft-furred mouse
- Tullberg's soft-furred mouse
- Red-bellied mosaic-tailed rat
- Sand rat
- Bishop's moss-mouse
- One-toothed shrew mouse
- Mottled-tailed shrew mouse
- Eastern shrew mouse
- Ash-grey mouse
- Silky mouse
- Bolam's mouse
- Western pebble-mound mouse
- Little native mouse
- Desert mouse
- Eastern chestnut mouse
- Sandy inland mouse
- Long-tailed mouse
- Central pebble-mound mouse
- Western chestnut mouse
- Western mouse
- Country mouse
- Sikkim rat
- Annandale's rat
- Ricefield rat
- Western New Guinea mountain rat
- Summit rat
- Bonthain rat
- Dusky rat
- Philippine forest rat
- Polynesian rat
- Bush rat
- Giluwe rat
- Hoffmann's rat
- Cape York rat
- Lesser ricefield rat
- Australian swamp rat
- Opossum rat
- Eastern rat
- Molaccan prehensile-tailed rat
- Moss-forest rat
- Himalayan field rat
- Brown rat
- New Guinean rat
- Osgood's rat
- Pocock's highland rat
- Large New Guinea spiny rat
- Turkestan rat
- Black rat
- Dusky field rat
- Stein's rat
- Tanezumi rat
- Malayan field rat
- Pale field rat
- Slender rat
- Long-haired rat
- Yellow-tailed rat
- Four-striped grass mouse
- Great gerbil
- Bushy-tailed jird
- Cordillera shrew-mouse
- Sierra Madre shrew mouse
- Ethiopian white-footed mouse
- Ethiopian narrow-headed rat
- Gray-tailed narrow-headed rat
- Target rat
- Mountain giant Sunda rat
- Müller's giant Sunda rat
- Celebes rat
- Long-footed rat
- Indian gerbil
- Robbins's tateril
- Congo gerbil
- Emin's gerbil
- Gracile tateril
- Lake Chad gerbil
- Petter's gerbil
- Senegal gerbil
- Tranieri's tateril
- Loring's rat
- Black-tailed tree rat
- Acacia rat
- Charming thicket rat
- Rudd's mouse
- Giant naked-tailed rat
- Giant white-tailed rat
- Asiatic long-tailed climbing mouse
- Red climbing mouse
- Mimic tree rat
- Hildegarde's broad-headed mouse
- Woosnam's broad-headed mouse
- Common rock rat
- Kimberley rock rat

==== Cricetids ====
Includes true hamsters, voles, lemmings, and New World rats and mice.

- Ruschi's rat
- Andean akodont
- Jelski's Altiplano mouse
- Woolly grass mouse
- Long-haired akodont
- Olive grass mouse
- Yellowish rice rat
- Olive montane mouse
- Highland grass mouse
- Colombian grass mouse
- White-bellied grass mouse
- Azara's grass mouse
- Bolivian grass mouse
- Budin's grass mouse
- Cursor grass mouse
- Day's grass mouse
- Dolorous grass mouse
- Smoky grass mouse
- Intelligent grass mouse
- Junín grass mouse
- Koford's grass mouse
- Altiplano grass mouse
- Thespian grass mouse
- Molina's grass mouse
- Soft grass mouse
- Montane grass mouse
- El Dorado grass mouse
- Paraná grass mouse
- Reig's grass mouse
- Serra do Mar grass mouse
- White-throated grass mouse
- Spegazzini's grass mouse
- Puno grass mouse
- Forest grass mouse
- Chaco grass mouse
- Cloud forest grass mouse
- Mongolian hamster
- Eversmann's hamster
- Silver mountain vole
- Gobi Altai mountain vole
- Lemming vole
- Large-eared vole
- Mongolian silver vole
- Stolička's mountain vole
- Flat-headed vole
- Tuva silver vole
- Olrog's chaco mouse
- Pearson's chaco mouse
- Andean mouse
- White-footed vole
- European water vole
- Montane water vole
- Bolivian big-eared mouse
- Painted big-eared mouse
- Andean big-eared mouse
- Southern pygmy mouse
- Northern pygmy mouse
- Chaco crimson-nosed rat
- Large-lipped crimson-nosed rat
- Afghan vole
- Bucharian vole
- Brazilian shrew mouse
- Ihering's hocicudo
- Bolivian vesper mouse
- Crafty vesper mouse
- Large vesper mouse
- Caatinga vesper mouse
- Fecund vesper mouse
- Hummelinck's vesper mouse
- Small vesper mouse
- Andean vesper mouse
- Drylands vesper mouse
- Peruvian vesper mouse
- Delicate vesper mouse
- Tocantins vesper mouse
- Córdoba vesper mouse
- Gansu hamster
- Ganzu vole
- Kolan vole
- Maracaju rice rat
- Lindbergh's rice rat
- Terraced rice rat
- Andean long-clawed mouse
- Colombian forest mouse
- Altiplano chinchilla mouse
- Caucasian snow vole
- European snow vole
- Robert's snow vole
- Tibetan dwarf hamster
- Chinese striped hamster
- Kam dwarf hamster
- Lama dwarf hamster
- Long-tailed dwarf hamster
- Gray dwarf hamster
- Sokolov's dwarf hamster
- Cricetulus tibetanus
- Montane Atlantic Forest rat
- Striped Atlantic Forest rat
- Pallid Atlantic Forest rat
- Kemp's grass mouse
- Northern collared lemming
- Ungava collared lemming
- Nelson's collared lemming
- Ogilvie Mountains collared lemming
- Richardson's collared lemming
- Arctic lemming
- Monte gerbil mouse
- Morgan's gerbil mouse
- Andean gerbil mouse
- Lowland gerbil mouse
- Southern mole vole
- Transcaucasian mole vole
- Northern mole vole
- Zaisan mole vole
- Yellow steppe lemming
- Przewalski's steppe lemming
- Kachin red-backed vole
- Pratt's vole
- Southwest China vole
- Père David's vole
- Yunnan red-backed vole
- Chaotung vole
- Yulungshan vole
- Biting chinchilla mouse
- Peterson's chinchilla mouse
- Big-headed rice rat
- Macconnell's rice rat
- Elegant rice rat
- Russet rice rat
- Long-clawed mole mouse
- Pale leaf-eared mouse
- Gray leaf-eared mouse
- Alfaro's rice rat
- Chapman's rice rat
- Dusky montane mouse
- Colombian rice rat
- Black-eared rice rat
- Long-nosed rice rat
- Allen's woodrat
- Web-footed marsh rat
- Chaco marsh rat
- Amazonian marsh rat
- Hylaeamys megacephalus
- Hylaeamys perenensis
- Yungas rice rat
- Murree vole
- Crab-eating rat
- Chilean climbing mouse
- Mount Pirri isthmus rat
- Lesser Wilfred's mouse
- Woolly giant rat
- Steppe lemming
- Brandt's vole
- Plateau vole
- Mandarin vole
- Sagebrush vole
- Amur lemming
- Norway lemming
- Siberian brown lemming
- North American brown lemming
- Andean rat
- Maned rat
- Southern big-eared mouse
- Pikumche pericote
- Lund's amphibious rat
- Dusky rice rat
- Robust dark rice rat
- Ciscaucasian hamster
- Highland small rice rat
- Forest small rice rat
- Insular vole
- Field vole
- Common vole
- Calabria pine vole
- California vole
- Gray-tailed vole
- Rock vole
- Clarke's vole
- Daghestan pine vole
- Doğramaci's vole
- Mediterranean pine vole
- Reed vole
- Gerbe's vole
- Narrow-headed vole
- Günther's vole
- Middendorf's vole
- Tien Shan vole
- Southern vole
- Liechtenstein's pine vole
- Lacustrine vole
- Long-tailed vole
- Lusitanian pine vole
- Major's pine vole
- Maximowicz's vole
- Mexican vole
- Middendorff's vole (Microtus middendorffii)
- Singing vole
- Mongolian vole
- Montane vole
- Japanese grass vole
- Alpine pine vole
- Prairie vole
- Tundra vole
- Creeping vole
- Paradox vole
- Meadow vole
- Woodland vole
- Qazvin vole
- Water vole
- Savi's pine vole
- Schidlovsky's vole
- Social vole
- European pine vole
- Tatra pine vole
- Thomas's pine vole
- Townsend's vole
- Transcaspian vole
- Taiga vole
- Japanese red-backed vole
- Western red-backed vole
- Tien Shan red-backed vole
- Southern red-backed vole
- Bank vole
- Royal vole
- Hokkaido red-backed vole
- Grey red-backed vole
- Northern red-backed vole
- Shansei vole
- Smith's vole
- Wood lemming
- Dubost's bristly mouse
- Guiana bristly mouse
- Neacomys minutus
- Neacomys musseri
- Neacomys paracou
- Bristly mouse
- Narrow-footed bristly mouse
- Pleasant bolo mouse
- Argentine bolo mouse
- Rufous-bellied bolo mouse
- Hairy-tailed bolo mouse
- Paraguayan bolo mouse
- Temchuk's bolo mouse
- Northern grass mouse
- Nectomys apicalis
- Trinidad water rat
- Small-footed bristly mouse
- South American water rat
- Chinese scrub vole
- Juniper vole
- Sikkim mountain vole
- Round-tailed muskrat
- Bogota grass mouse
- White-throated woodrat
- Nicaraguan woodrat
- Bushy-tailed woodrat
- Arizona woodrat
- Eastern woodrat
- Dusky-footed woodrat
- Goldman's woodrat
- Desert woodrat
- White-toothed woodrat
- Big-eared woodrat
- Mexican woodrat
- Southern Plains woodrat
- Stephens' woodrat
- Mexican volcano mouse
- Andean swamp rat
- Tomes's rice rat
- Ecuadorean rice rat
- Nephelomys caracolus
- Boquete rice rat
- Keays's rice rat
- Light-footed rice rat
- Nephelomys meridensis
- Montane fish-eating rat
- Peruvian fish-eating rat
- Edwards's long-clawed mouse
- Sumichrast's vesper rat
- Golden mouse
- Oecomys auyantepui
- Bicolored arboreal rice rat
- Oecomys catherinae
- Natterer's oecomys
- Yellow arboreal rice rat
- Mamore arboreal rice rat
- Dusky arboreal rice rat
- King arboreal rice rat
- Robert's arboreal rice rat
- Red arboreal rice rat
- Arboreal rice rat
- Foothill arboreal rice rat
- Long-furred rice rat
- Andean pygmy rice rat
- Sandy pygmy rice rat
- Chacoan pygmy rice rat
- Oligoryzomys delticola
- Destructive pygmy rice rat
- Brazilian pygmy rice rat
- Yellow pygmy rice rat
- Fornes' colilargo
- Fulvous pygmy rice rat
- Grayish pygmy rice rat
- Long-tailed pygmy rice rat
- Magellanic pygmy rice rat
- Small-eared pygmy rice rat
- Black-footed pygmy rice rat
- Oligoryzomys stramineus
- Sprightly pygmy rice rat
- Muskrat
- Mearns' grasshopper mouse
- Northern grasshopper mouse
- Southern grasshopper mouse
- Coues's rice rat
- Thomas's rice rat
- Marsh rice rat
- Michoacan deer mouse
- Hatt's vesper rat
- Big-eared climbing rat
- Amazonian hocicudo
- Angular hocicudo
- Caparaó hocicudo
- Atlantic Forest hocicudo
- Spy hocicudo
- Small hocicudo
- Hispid hocicudo
- Incan hocicudo
- Long-nosed hocicudo
- Paramo hocicudo
- Quaestor hocicudo
- Robert's hocicudo
- Red hocicudo
- Texas mouse
- Aztec mouse
- Orizaba deer mouse
- Brush mouse
- California mouse
- Canyon mouse
- Zacatecan deer mouse
- Cactus mouse
- Eva's desert mouse
- Northern Baja deermouse
- Cotton mouse
- Osgood's mouse
- Guatemalan deer mouse
- Naked-eared deer mouse
- Hooper's mouse
- Transvolcanic deermouse
- Northwestern deer mouse
- White-footed mouse
- Nimble-footed mouse
- North American deermouse
- Brown deer mouse
- Plateau mouse
- Black-eared mouse
- Mesquite mouse
- Mexican deer mouse
- Northern rock mouse
- White-ankled mouse
- Tawny deer mouse
- Oldfield mouse
- Peromyscus schmidlyi
- Gleaning mouse
- Stirton's deer mouse
- Pinyon mouse
- Yucatan deer mouse
- Blyth's vole
- Western heather vole
- Eastern heather vole
- Campbell's dwarf hamster
- Roborovski hamster
- Djungarian hamster
- Friendly leaf-eared mouse
- Andean leaf-eared mouse
- Capricorn leaf-eared mouse
- Darwin's leaf-eared mouse
- Gerbil leaf-eared mouse
- Haggard's leaf-eared mouse
- Lima leaf-eared mouse
- Master leaf-eared mouse
- Bunchgrass leaf-eared mouse
- Wolffsohn's leaf-eared mouse
- Yellow-rumped leaf-eared mouse
- Brazilian false rice rat
- Bunny rat
- Naked-soled conyrat
- Short-nosed harvest mouse
- Volcano harvest mouse
- Chiriqui harvest mouse
- Darien harvest mouse
- Fulvous harvest mouse
- Slender harvest mouse
- Eastern harvest mouse
- Western harvest mouse
- Mexican harvest mouse
- Small-toothed harvest mouse
- Plains harvest mouse
- Rodriguez's harvest mouse
- Sumichrast's harvest mouse
- Zacatecas harvest mouse
- Long-tongued arboreal mouse
- Goldman's water mouse
- Underwood's water mouse
- Southern climbing mouse
- Coues's climbing mouse
- Eastern Amazon climbing mouse
- Buff-bellied climbing mouse
- Gardner's climbing mouse
- Broad-footed climbing mouse
- White-footed climbing mouse
- MacConnell's climbing mouse
- Cerrado climbing mouse
- Atlantic Forest climbing mouse
- Peruvian climbing mouse
- Splendid climbing mouse
- Venezuelan climbing mouse
- Charming climbing mouse
- Wetzel's climbing mouse
- Argentine swamp rat
- Waterhouse's swamp rat
- South American spiny mouse
- Ucayali spiny mouse
- Alston's brown mouse
- Chiriqui brown mouse
- Allen's cotton rat
- Alston's cotton rat
- Arizona cotton rat
- Tawny-bellied cotton rat
- Southern cotton rat
- Hispid cotton rat
- White-eared cotton rat
- Jaliscan cotton rat
- Yellow-nosed cotton rat
- Peruvian cotton rat
- Toltec cotton rat
- Alfaro's rice water rat
- Sooretamys angouya
- Northern bog lemming
- Southern bog lemming
- Primordial tapecua
- Cerrado mouse
- Hairy-eared cerrado mouse
- Blackish grass mouse
- Apeco Oldfield mouse
- Golden Oldfield mouse
- Beady-eyed mouse
- White-tipped Oldfield mouse
- Ashy-bellied Oldfield mouse
- Ash-colored Oldfield mouse
- Cinnamon-colored Oldfield mouse
- Daphne's Oldfield mouse
- Peruvian Oldfield mouse
- Wandering Oldfield mouse
- Inca Oldfield mouse
- Strong-tailed Oldfield mouse
- Kalinowski's Oldfield mouse
- Ladew's Oldfield mouse
- Soft-furred Oldfield mouse
- Large-eared Oldfield mouse
- Snow-footed Oldfield mouse
- Distinguished Oldfield mouse
- Ashaninka Oldfield mouse
- Montane Oldfield mouse
- Paramo Oldfield mouse
- Forest Oldfield mouse
- Taczanowski's Oldfield mouse
- Dressy Oldfield mouse
- Bolivar rice rat
- Talamancan rice rat
- Greater long-tailed hamster
- Mira climbing rat
- Peters's climbing rat
- Watson's climbing rat
- Red-nosed mouse
- Short-tailed cane mouse
- Brown cane mouse

==== Nesomyids ====
- Lesser hamster-rat
- White-tailed antsangy
- Betsileo short-tailed rat
- Gregarious short-tailed rat
- Emin's pouched rat
- Gambian pouched rat
- Montane African climbing mouse
- Kivu climbing mouse
- Lovat's climbing mouse
- Gray climbing mouse
- Brant's climbing mouse
- Banana climbing mouse
- Chestnut climbing mouse
- Nyika climbing mouse
- Cameroon climbing mouse
- Daniel's tufted-tailed rat
- Grandidier's tufted-tailed rat
- Major's tufted-tailed rat
- Lesser tufted-tailed rat
- Dormouse tufted-tailed rat
- Tanala tufted-tailed rat
- Webb's tufted-tailed rat
- Voalavoanala
- Bastard big-footed mouse
- Gerbil mouse
- Malagasy mountain mouse
- White-bellied nesomys
- Island mouse
- Barbour's rock mouse
- Pygmy rock mouse
- Brukkaros pygmy rock mouse
- Shortridge's rock mouse
- South African pouched mouse
- Mearns's pouched mouse
- Bocage's African fat mouse
- Northwestern fat mouse
- Dainty fat mouse
- Krebs's fat mouse
- Pousargues African fat mouse
- Tiny fat mouse
- Fat mouse
- Naked-tailed voalavo

==== Spalacids ====
- Lesser bamboo rat
- Chinese zokor
- Rothschild's zokor
- Smith's zokor
- False zokor
- Siberian zokor
- Transbaikal zokor
- Hoary bamboo rat
- Chinese bamboo rat
- Large bamboo rat
- Middle East blind mole-rat
- Giant mole-rat
- Lesser mole-rat
- Greater mole-rat
- Nehring's blind mole-rat
- Kazakhstan blind mole-rat
- East African mole-rat

==== Dipodids ====
- Balikun jerboa
- Gobi jerboa
- Small five-toed jerboa
- Hotson's jerboa
- Great jerboa
- Severtzov's jerboa
- Mongolian five-toed jerboa
- Williams' jerboa
- Bobrinski's jerboa
- Northern three-toed jerboa
- Chinese jumping mouse
- Lichtenstein's jerboa
- Long-eared jerboa
- Blanford's jerboa
- Lesser Egyptian jerboa
- Greater Egyptian jerboa
- Woodland jumping mouse
- Comb-toed jerboa
- Lesser fat-tailed jerboa
- Dwarf fat-tailed jerboa
- Greater fat-tailed jerboa
- Thick-tailed pygmy jerboa
- Kozlov's pygmy jerboa
- Euphrates jerboa
- Vinogradov's jerboa
- Northern birch mouse
- Chinese birch mouse
- Kluchor birch mouse
- Altai birch mouse
- Severtzov's birch mouse
- Strand's birch mouse
- Southern birch mouse
- Tien Shan birch mouse
- Andrews's three-toed jerboa
- Mongolian three-toed jerboa
- Thick-tailed three-toed jerboa
- Meadow jumping mouse
- Western jumping mouse
- Pacific jumping mouse

==== Mouse-like hamsters ====
- Zagros Mountains mouse-like hamster
- Baluchi mouse-like hamster
- Goodwin's brush-tailed mouse
- Noble mouse-like hamster
- Hotson's mouse-like hamster
- Great Balkhan mouse-like hamster
- Urar mouse-like hamster

=== Castorimorpha ===
There are 79 species and two subspecies in Castorimorpha assessed as least concern.

==== Heteromyids ====
- Little desert pocket mouse
- Narrow-skulled pocket mouse
- Bailey's pocket mouse
- California pocket mouse
- Chihuahuan pocket mouse
- San Diego pocket mouse
- Long-tailed pocket mouse
- Hispid pocket mouse
- Rock pocket mouse
- Nelson's pocket mouse
- Desert pocket mouse
- Sinaloan pocket mouse
- Baja pocket mouse
- Spiny pocket mouse
- Agile kangaroo rat
- California kangaroo rat
- Gulf Coast kangaroo rat
- Desert kangaroo rat
- Heermann's kangaroo rat
- Merriam's kangaroo rat
- Chisel-toothed kangaroo rat
- Nelson's kangaroo rat
- Ord's kangaroo rat
- Panamint kangaroo rat
- Phillips' kangaroo rat
- Dulzura kangaroo rat
- Narrow-faced kangaroo rat
- Panamanian spiny pocket mouse
- Trinidad spiny pocket mouse
- Southern spiny pocket mouse
- Desmarest's spiny pocket mouse
- Gaumer's spiny pocket mouse
- Mexican spiny pocket mouse
- Mountain spiny pocket mouse
- Painted spiny pocket mouse
- Salvin's spiny pocket mouse
- Dark kangaroo mouse
- Pale kangaroo mouse
- Arizona pocket mouse
- Olive-backed pocket mouse
- Plains pocket mouse
- Silky pocket mouse
- San Joaquin pocket mouse
- Little pocket mouse
- Merriam's pocket mouse
- Great Basin pocket mouse

==== Gophers ====
Species

- Yellow-faced pocket gopher
- Oriental basin pocket gopher
- Smoky pocket gopher
- Goldman's pocket gopher
- Merriam's pocket gopher
- Cofre de Perote pocket gopher
- Volcán de Toluca pocket gopher
- Attwater's pocket gopher
- Baird's pocket gopher
- Plains pocket gopher
- Knox Jones's pocket gopher
- Texas pocket gopher
- Southeastern pocket gopher
- Central Texas pocket gopher
- Cherrie's pocket gopher
- Darien pocket gopher
- Chiriqui pocket gopher
- Oaxacan pocket gopher
- Giant pocket gopher
- Variable pocket gopher
- Hispid pocket gopher
- Underwood's pocket gopher
- Buller's pocket gopher
- Botta's pocket gopher
- Camas pocket gopher
- Wyoming pocket gopher
- Idaho pocket gopher
- Mazama pocket gopher
- Mountain pocket gopher
- Northern pocket gopher
- Townsend's pocket gopher
- Southern pocket gopher

Subspecies

- Nicaraguan pocket gopher
- Thaeler's pocket gopher

==== Castorids ====
- North American beaver
- Eurasian beaver

=== Sciuromorpha ===
There are 198 species in Sciuromorpha assessed as least concern.

==== Sciurids ====
Squirrels, chipmunks, marmots, susliks and prairie dogs

- Groove-toothed flying squirrel
- Thomas's flying squirrel
- Harris's antelope squirrel
- Texas antelope squirrel
- White-tailed antelope squirrel
- Barbary ground squirrel
- Kinabalu squirrel
- Grey-bellied squirrel
- Pallas's squirrel
- Finlayson's squirrel
- Inornate squirrel
- Black-striped squirrel
- Plantain squirrel
- Borneo black-banded squirrel
- Phayre's squirrel
- Prevost's squirrel
- Irrawaddy squirrel
- Golden-mantled ground squirrel
- Cascade golden-mantled ground squirrel
- Gunnison's prairie dog
- White-tailed prairie dog
- Black-tailed prairie dog
- Bornean mountain ground squirrel
- Red-throated squirrel
- Orange-bellied Himalayan squirrel
- Perny's long-nosed squirrel
- Red-hipped squirrel
- Asian red-cheeked squirrel
- Kashmir flying squirrel
- Western palm squirrel
- Siberian chipmunk
- Philippine pygmy squirrel
- Tufted pygmy squirrel
- Indian palm squirrel
- Northern palm squirrel
- Jungle palm squirrel
- Thomas's rope squirrel
- Carruther's mountain squirrel
- Congo rope squirrel
- Lady Burton's rope squirrel
- Ribboned rope squirrel
- Red-cheeked rope squirrel
- Fire-footed rope squirrel
- Northern flying squirrel
- Southern flying squirrel
- Gambian sun squirrel
- Mutable sun squirrel
- Red-legged sun squirrel
- Ruwenzori sun squirrel
- Particolored flying squirrel
- Indochinese flying squirrel
- Red-cheeked flying squirrel
- Montane long-nosed squirrel
- Mexican ground squirrel
- Thirteen-lined ground squirrel
- Javanese flying squirrel
- Three-striped ground squirrel
- Gray marmot
- Bobak marmot
- Alaska marmot
- Hoary marmot
- Black-capped marmot
- Long-tailed marmot
- Yellow-bellied marmot
- Himalayan marmot
- Alpine marmot
- Groundhog
- Olympic marmot
- Berdmore's ground squirrel
- Central American dwarf squirrel
- Amazon dwarf squirrel
- Western dwarf squirrel
- African pygmy squirrel
- Black-eared squirrel
- Alpine chipmunk
- Yellow-pine chipmunk
- Gray-footed chipmunk
- Gray-collared chipmunk
- Cliff chipmunk
- Durango chipmunk
- Merriam's chipmunk
- Least chipmunk
- California chipmunk
- Yellow-cheeked chipmunk
- Panamint chipmunk
- Long-eared chipmunk
- Colorado chipmunk
- Red-tailed chipmunk
- Hopi chipmunk
- Allen's chipmunk
- Siskiyou chipmunk
- Sonoma chipmunk
- Lodgepole chipmunk
- Townsend's chipmunk
- Uinta chipmunk
- Tropical ground squirrel
- Ring-tailed ground squirrel
- California ground squirrel
- Rock squirrel
- Alexander's bush squirrel
- Boehm's bush squirrel
- Smith's bush squirrel
- Striped bush squirrel
- Ochre bush squirrel
- Red bush squirrel
- Green bush squirrel
- Red and white giant flying squirrel
- Spotted giant flying squirrel
- Japanese giant flying squirrel
- Hodgson's giant flying squirrel
- Red giant flying squirrel
- Indian giant flying squirrel
- Chinese giant flying squirrel
- Basilan flying squirrel
- Mindanao flying squirrel
- Franklin's ground squirrel
- Whitish dwarf squirrel
- Celebes dwarf squirrel
- Sanghir squirrel
- Forest giant squirrel
- Japanese dwarf flying squirrel
- Siberian flying squirrel
- Indian giant squirrel
- Père David's rock squirrel
- Forrest's rock squirrel
- Abert's squirrel
- Brazilian squirrel
- Allen's squirrel
- Caucasian squirrel
- Mexican gray squirrel
- Eastern gray squirrel
- Collie's squirrel
- Deppe's squirrel
- Red-tailed squirrel
- Western gray squirrel
- Northern Amazon red squirrel
- Japanese squirrel
- Mexican fox squirrel
- Fox squirrel
- Peters's squirrel
- Southern Amazon red squirrel
- Guayaquil squirrel
- Variegated squirrel
- Red squirrel
- Yucatan squirrel
- Long-clawed ground squirrel
- Alashan ground squirrel
- Brandt's ground squirrel
- Daurian ground squirrel
- Red-cheeked ground squirrel
- Yellow ground squirrel
- Caucasian mountain ground squirrel
- Pallid ground squirrel
- Little ground squirrel
- Spermophilus relictus
- Taurus ground squirrel
- Brooke's squirrel
- Busuanga squirrel
- Jentink's squirrel
- Northern Palawan tree squirrel
- Low's squirrel
- Mindanao squirrel
- Philippine tree squirrel
- Samar squirrel
- Southern Palawan tree squirrel
- Slender squirrel
- Eastern chipmunk
- Douglas squirrel
- American red squirrel
- Himalayan striped squirrel
- Maritime striped squirrel
- Cambodian striped squirrel
- Swinhoe's striped squirrel
- Uinta ground squirrel
- Belding's ground squirrel
- Merriam's ground squirrel
- Columbian ground squirrel
- Wyoming ground squirrel
- Piute ground squirrel
- Arctic ground squirrel
- Richardson's ground squirrel
- Long-tailed ground squirrel
- Spotted ground squirrel
- Round-tailed ground squirrel
- Striped ground squirrel
- Cape ground squirrel
- Mountain ground squirrel
- Unstriped ground squirrel

==== Dormice ====
- Forest dormouse
- Asian garden dormouse
- Maghreb garden dormouse
- Japanese dormouse
- Edible dormouse
- Christy's dormouse
- Kellen's dormouse
- Lorrain dormouse
- Small-eared dormouse
- Woodland dormouse
- Nagtglas's African dormouse
- Spectacled dormouse
- Rock dormouse
- Stone dormouse
- Hazel dormouse

==== Aplodontiids ====
- Mountain beaver

=== Anomaluromorpha ===
("Anomalure-like")

- Beecroft's flying squirrel
- Lord Derby's scaly-tailed squirrel
- Pel's flying squirrel
- Dwarf scaly-tailed squirrel
- Long-eared flying mouse
- Pygmy scaly-tailed flying squirrel
- South African springhare
- East African spring-hare
- Cameroon scaly-tail

== Cingulata ==
- Northern naked-tailed armadillo
- Greater naked-tailed armadillo
- Southern naked-tailed armadillo
- Screaming hairy armadillo
- Big hairy armadillo
- Greater long-nosed armadillo
- Nine-banded armadillo
- Seven-banded armadillo
- Six-banded armadillo

== Bats ==
There are 687 bat species assessed as least concern.

=== Megabats ===
- Borneo fruit bat
- Pygmy fruit bat
- Mindanao pygmy fruit bat
- Spotted-winged fruit bat
- Short-palated fruit bat
- Black-capped fruit bat
- Lesser short-nosed fruit bat
- Horsfield's fruit bat
- Peters's fruit bat
- Minute fruit bat
- Nusatenggara short-nosed fruit bat
- Greater short-nosed fruit bat
- Indonesian short-nosed fruit bat
- Andersen's naked-backed fruit bat
- Beaufort's naked-backed fruit bat
- Halmahera naked-backed fruit bat
- Sulawesi naked-backed fruit bat
- Solomon's naked-backed fruit bat
- Lesser naked-backed fruit bat
- Moluccan naked-backed fruit bat
- Western naked-backed fruit bat
- New Britain naked-backed fruit bat
- Greenish naked-backed fruit bat
- Cave nectar bat
- Peters's epauletted fruit bat
- Gambian epauletted fruit bat
- Ethiopian epauletted fruit bat
- East African epauletted fruit bat
- Minor epauletted fruit bat
- Wahlberg's epauletted fruit bat
- Buettikofer's epauletted fruit bat
- Dobson's epauletted fruit bat
- Franquet's epauletted fruit bat
- Fischer's pygmy fruit bat
- Harpy fruit bat
- Hammer-headed bat
- Angolan rousette
- Long-tongued nectar bat
- Long-tongued fruit bat
- Tailless fruit bat
- Ratanaworabhan's fruit bat
- Western Woermann's fruit bat
- Woermann's bat
- Black-bellied fruit bat
- Woodford's fruit bat
- Peters' dwarf epauletted fruit bat
- Sierra Leone collared fruit bat
- East African little collared fruit bat
- Little collared fruit bat
- Veldkamp's dwarf epauletted fruit bat
- Broad-striped tube-nosed fruit bat
- Common tube-nosed fruit bat
- Pallas's tube-nosed bat
- Mountain tube-nosed fruit bat
- Island tube-nosed fruit bat
- Eastern tube-nosed bat
- Umboi tube-nosed fruit bat
- Luzon fruit bat
- Lesser tube-nosed fruit bat
- Steadfast tube-nosed fruit bat
- Dusky fruit bat
- Greater musky fruit bat
- Lesser musky fruit bat
- Admiralty flying fox
- Black flying fox
- Spectacled flying fox
- Big-eared flying fox
- Great flying fox
- Masked flying fox
- Little red flying fox
- Seychelles fruit bat
- Insular flying fox
- Egyptian fruit bat
- Geoffroy's rousette
- Sulawesi rousette
- Long-haired rousette
- Blanford's fruit bat
- Common blossom bat
- Moss-forest blossom bat
- Swift fruit bat

=== Microbats ===
There are 609 microbat species assessed as least concern.

==== Old World leaf-nosed bats ====
- Patrizi's trident leaf-nosed bat
- Trident bat
- Stoliczka's trident bat
- Temminck's trident bat
- Percival's trident bat
- East Asian tailless leaf-nosed bat
- Aba roundleaf bat
- Great roundleaf bat
- Dusky leaf-nosed bat
- Benito roundleaf bat
- Bicolored roundleaf bat
- Sundevall's roundleaf bat
- Spurred roundleaf bat
- Fawn leaf-nosed bat
- Ashy roundleaf bat
- Cyclops roundleaf bat
- Diadem leaf-nosed bat
- Dayak roundleaf bat
- Sooty roundleaf bat
- Fulvus roundleaf bat
- Cantor's roundleaf bat
- Giant roundleaf bat
- Indian roundleaf bat
- Intermediate roundleaf bat
- Shield-faced roundleaf bat
- Maduran leaf-nosed bat
- Maggie Taylor's roundleaf bat
- Ethiopian large-eared roundleaf bat
- Philippine forest roundleaf bat
- Biak roundleaf bat
- Pomona roundleaf bat
- Pratt's roundleaf bat
- Philippine pygmy roundleaf bat
- Laotian leaf-nosed bat
- Noack's roundleaf bat
- Schneider's leaf-nosed bat
- Northern leaf-nosed bat
- Sumba roundleaf bat
- Saõ Tomé leaf-nosed bat
- Wollaston's roundleaf bat
- Trouessart's trident bat
- Orange leaf-nosed bat
- Rufous trident bat
- Triaenops menamena (Note: Listed by IUCN as Triaenops rufus.)

==== Horseshoe bats ====
- Acuminate horseshoe bat
- Intermediate horseshoe bat
- Halcyon horseshoe bat
- Arcuate horseshoe bat
- Lesser woolly horseshoe bat
- Blasius's horseshoe bat
- Bokhara horseshoe bat
- Bornean horseshoe bat
- Cape horseshoe bat
- Sulawesi horseshoe bat
- Geoffroy's horseshoe bat
- Croslet horseshoe bat
- Creagh's horseshoe bat
- Darling's horseshoe bat
- Dent's horseshoe bat
- Eloquent horseshoe bat
- Broad-eared horseshoe bat
- Greater horseshoe bat
- Formosan woolly horseshoe bat
- Rüppell's horseshoe bat
- Hildebrandt's horseshoe bat
- Lesser horseshoe bat
- Philippine forest horseshoe bat
- Lander's horseshoe bat
- Blyth's horseshoe bat
- Woolly horseshoe bat
- Big-eared horseshoe bat
- Malayan horseshoe bat
- Marshall's horseshoe bat
- Smaller horseshoe bat
- Osgood's horseshoe bat
- Bourret's horseshoe bat
- Pearson's horseshoe bat
- Large-eared horseshoe bat
- Least horseshoe bat
- King horseshoe bat
- Rufous horseshoe bat
- Shamel's horseshoe bat
- Shortridge's horseshoe bat
- Thai horseshoe bat
- Bushveld horseshoe bat
- Chinese rufous horseshoe bat
- Lesser brown horseshoe bat
- Little Nepalese horseshoe bat
- Swinny's horseshoe bat
- Thomas's horseshoe bat
- Trefoil horseshoe bat
- Yellow-faced horseshoe bat
- Dobson's horseshoe bat

==== Vesper bats ====
- Pallid bat
- Collared pipistrelle
- Black-gilded pipistrelle
- Necklace pipistrelle
- Asian barbastelle
- Gould's wattled bat
- Chocolate wattled bat
- Hoary wattled bat
- Rafinesque's big-eared bat
- Townsend's big-eared bat
- Little black serotine
- Bobrinski's serotine
- Botta's serotine
- Brazilian brown bat
- Chiriquinan serotine
- Horn-skinned bat
- Argentine brown bat
- Big brown bat
- Gobi big brown bat
- Long-tailed house bat
- Meridional serotine
- Sind bat
- Northern bat
- Thick-eared bat
- Serotine bat
- Spotted bat
- Disk-footed bat
- Chocolate pipistrelle
- Eastern false pipistrelle
- Allen's striped bat
- Silvered bat
- Beatrix's bat
- Abo bat
- Pied bat
- Variegated butterfly bat
- Common thick-thumbed bat
- Formosan golden tube-nosed bat
- Lesser hairy-winged bat
- Blanford's bat
- Tickell's bat
- Thomas's big-eared brown bat
- Big-eared brown bat
- Southern big-eared brown bat
- Small big-eared brown bat
- Savi's pipistrelle
- Great evening bat
- Allen's big-eared bat
- Damara woolly bat
- Hardwicke's woolly bat
- Kachin woolly bat
- Lesser woolly bat
- Lenis woolly bat
- Fly River trumpet-eared bat
- Papillose woolly bat
- Spurrell's woolly bat
- Painted bat
- Smith's woolly bat
- Titania's woolly bat
- Whitehead's woolly bat
- Botswanan long-eared bat
- Namib long-eared bat
- De Winton's long-eared bat
- Silver-haired bat
- Greater red bat
- Desert red bat
- Eastern red bat
- Hoary bat
- Southern yellow bat
- Northern yellow bat
- Seminole bat
- Cinnamon red bat
- Western yellow bat
- Moloney's mimic bat
- Little tube-nosed bat
- Round-eared tube-nosed bat
- Flute-nosed bat
- Harrison's tube-nosed bat
- Hilgendorf's tube-nosed bat
- Hutton's tube-nosed bat
- Greater tube-nosed bat
- Brown tube-nosed bat
- Scully's tube-nosed bat
- Ussuri tube-nosed bat
- Large-footed bat
- Silver-tipped myotis
- Szechwan myotis
- Hairy-faced bat
- Peters's myotis
- Steppe whiskered bar
- Southwestern myotis
- Southeastern myotis
- Lesser mouse-eared bat
- Rufous mouse-eared bat
- Brandt's bat
- California myotis
- Chilean myotis
- Large myotis
- Western small-footed bat
- Daubenton's bat
- David's myotis
- Myotis dinellii
- Elegant myotis
- Geoffroy's bat
- Long-eared myotis
- Fringed long-footed myotis
- Hodgson's bat
- Cinnamon myotis
- Gomantong myotis
- Malagasy mouse-eared bat
- Lesser large-footed bat
- Horsfield's bat
- Ikonnikov's bat
- Hairy-legged myotis
- Keen's myotis
- Chinese water myotis
- Eastern small-footed myotis
- Yellowish myotis
- Eastern long-fingered bat
- Myotis macropus
- Pallid large-footed myotis
- Dark-nosed small-footed myotis
- Maluku myotis
- Burmese whiskered bat
- Wall-roosting mouse-eared bat
- Greater mouse-eared bat
- Whiskered bat
- Natterer's bat
- Curacao myotis
- Black myotis
- Nepal myotis
- Arizona myotis
- Montane myotis
- Beijing mouse-eared bat
- Riparian myotis
- Thick-thumbed myotis
- Northern long-eared bat
- Himalayan whiskered bat
- Fringed myotis
- Cape hairy bat
- Cave myotis
- Long-legged myotis
- Welwitsch's bat
- Yuma myotis
- Cape serotine
- Tiny serotine
- Malagasy serotine
- Banana pipistrelle bat
- Rendall's serotine
- Somali serotine
- White-winged serotine
- Zulu serotine
- Lesser noctule
- Mountain noctule
- Common noctule
- Chinese noctule
- Schlieffen's bat
- Evening bat
- Northern long-eared bat
- Eastern long-eared bat
- Lesser long-eared bat
- Gould's long-eared bat
- New Guinea long-eared bat
- Pygmy long-eared bat
- Desert long-eared bat
- Rohu's bat
- Peters's trumpet-eared bat
- Golden-tipped bat
- Japanese house bat
- Forest pipistrelle
- Alashanian pipistrelle
- Anchieta's bat
- Angulate pipistrelle
- Cadorna's pipistrelle
- Kelaart's pipistrelle
- Greater Papuan pipistrelle
- Indian pipistrelle
- Broad-headed pipistrelle
- Dusky pipistrelle
- Western pipistrelle
- Brown pipistrelle
- Java pipistrelle
- Kuhl's pipistrelle
- Tiny pipistrelle
- Nathusius's pipistrelle
- Lesser Papuan pipistrelle
- Mount Popa pipistrelle
- Common pipistrelle
- Chinese pipistrelle
- Soprano pipistrelle
- Rüppell's pipistrelle
- Rusty pipistrelle
- Narrow-winged pipistrelle
- Eastern pipistrelle
- Least pipistrelle
- Watts's pipistrelle
- Northern pipistrelle
- Brown long-eared bat
- Grey long-eared bat
- Kolombatovic's long-eared bat
- Alpine long-eared bat
- Plecotus ognevi
- Japanese long-eared bat
- Yucatan yellow bat
- Allen's yellow bat
- Slender yellow bat
- Thomas's yellow bat
- Little yellow bat
- Black-winged little yellow bat
- Rüppell's broad-nosed bat
- Dark-winged lesser house bat
- Desert yellow bat
- Harlequin bat
- Sody's yellow house bat
- African yellow bat
- Greater Asiatic yellow bat
- Lesser Asiatic yellow bat
- White-bellied yellow bat
- Marovaza house bat
- Schreber's yellow bat
- Nut-colored yellow bat
- Robust yellow bat
- Greenish yellow bat
- Western broad-nosed bat
- Little broad-nosed bat
- Eastern broad-nosed bat
- Northern broad-nosed bat
- Dormer's bat
- Lesser bamboo bat
- Greater bamboo bat
- Inland forest bat
- Northern cave bat
- Large forest bat
- Yellow-lipped bat
- Finlayson's cave bat
- Eastern forest bat
- Southern forest bat
- Eastern cave bat
- Little forest bat
- Parti-coloured bat
- Asian particolored bat

==== Long-fingered bats ====
- African long-fingered bat
- Little bent-wing bat
- Lesser long-fingered bat
- Glen's long-fingered bat
- Greater long-fingered bat
- Western bent-winged bat
- Major's long-fingered bat
- Manavil long-fingered bat
- Intermediate long-fingered bat
- Natal long-fingered bat
- Philippine long-fingered bat
- Small bent-winged bat
- Shortridge's long-fingered bat
- Sororcula long-fingered bat
- Great bent-winged bat

==== Sac-winged bats ====
- Gray sac-winged bat
- Thomas's shaggy bat
- Shaggy bat
- African sheath-tailed bat
- Chestnut sac-winged bat
- Short-eared bat
- Northern ghost bat
- Isabelle's ghost bat
- Lesser ghost bat
- Small Asian sheath-tailed bat
- Beccari's sheath-tailed bat
- Large-eared sheath-tailed bat
- Lesser sheath-tailed bat
- Raffray's sheath-tailed bat
- Dark sheath-tailed bat
- Peter's sheath-tailed bat
- Western sheath-tailed bat
- Greater dog-like bat
- White-winged dog-like bat
- Lesser dog-like bat
- Proboscis bat
- Yellow-bellied sheath-tailed bat
- Pel's pouched bat
- Naked-rumped pouched bat
- Greater sac-winged bat
- Frosted sac-winged bat
- Lesser sac-winged bat
- Common sheath-tailed bat
- Hill's sheath-tailed bat
- Arnhem sheath-tailed bat
- Long-winged tomb bat
- Mauritian tomb bat
- Black-bearded tomb bat
- Naked-rumped tomb bat
- Egyptian tomb bat
- Theobald's tomb bat
- Troughton's sheath-tailed bat

==== Free-tailed bats ====
- White-striped free-tailed bat
- New Guinea free-tailed bat
- Duke of Abruzzi's free-tailed bat
- Ansorge's free-tailed bat
- Gland-tailed free-tailed bat
- Spotted free-tailed bat
- Chapin's free-tailed bat
- Northern freetail bat
- Black and red free-tailed bat
- Lappet-eared free-tailed bat
- Nigerian free-tailed bat
- Wrinkle-lipped free-tailed bat (Chaerephon plicatus)
- Little free-tailed bat
- Solomons mastiff bat
- Lesser naked bat
- Hairless bat
- Greenhall's dog-faced bat
- Mexican dog-faced bat
- Southern dog-faced bat
- Black bonneted bat
- Dwarf bonneted bat
- Big bonneted bat
- Wagner's bonneted bat
- Sanborn's bonneted bat
- Patagonian bonneted bat
- Western mastiff bat
- Colombian bonneted bat
- Underwood's bonneted bat
- Mato Grosso dog-faced bat
- Dwarf dog-faced bat
- Aztec mastiff bat
- Coiban mastiff bat
- Bonda mastiff bat
- Velvety free-tailed bat
- Miller's mastiff bat
- Black mastiff bat
- Sinaloan mastiff bat
- Sierra Leone free-tailed bat
- Angolan free-tailed bat
- Medje free-tailed bat
- Mongalla free-tailed bat
- Malagasy white-bellied free-tailed bat
- Midas free-tailed bat
- Dwarf free-tailed bat
- White-bellied free-tailed bat
- Spurrell's free-tailed bat
- Railer bat
- Beccari's free-tailed bat
- Peter's wrinkle-lipped bat
- Kalinowski's mastiff bat
- Loria's mastiff bat
- Southern free-tailed bat
- Bini free-tailed bat
- Peale's free-tailed bat
- Pocketed free-tailed bat
- Broad-eared bat
- Big free-tailed bat
- Madagascar free-tailed bat
- Peters's flat-headed bat
- Big crested mastiff bat
- Brown mastiff bat
- Roberts's flat-headed bat
- Egyptian free-tailed bat
- Mexican free-tailed bat
- Madagascan large free-tailed bat
- Kenyan big-eared free-tailed bat
- European free-tailed bat

==== Mormoopids ====
Includes ghost-faced bats, moustached bats, and naked-backed bats.

- Antillean ghost-faced bat
- Ghost-faced bat
- Davy's naked-backed bat
- Big naked-backed bat
- Macleay's mustached bat
- Parnell's mustached bat
- Wagner's mustached bat
- Sooty mustached bat

==== Leaf-nosed bats ====
- Little white-shouldered bat
- Tailed tailless bat
- Handley's tailless bat
- Geoffroy's tailless bat
- Broad-toothed tailless bat
- Luis Manuel's tailless bat
- Tree bat
- Jamaican fig-eating bat
- Large fruit-eating bat
- Brown fruit-eating bat
- Fringed fruit-eating bat
- Fraternal fruit-eating bat
- Hairy fruit-eating bat
- Jamaican fruit bat
- Great fruit-eating bat
- Dark fruit-eating bat
- Flat-faced fruit-eating bat
- Antillean fruit-eating bat
- Cuban fruit-eating bat
- Silky short-tailed bat
- Chestnut short-tailed bat
- Manu short-tailed bat
- Seba's short-tailed bat
- Sowell's short-tailed bat
- Gray short-tailed bat
- Wrinkle-faced bat
- Brazilian big-eyed bat
- Salvin's big-eyed bat
- Little big-eyed bat
- Hairy big-eyed bat
- Godman's long-tailed bat
- Lesser long-tongued bat
- Big-eared woolly bat
- Andersen's fruit-eating bat
- Aztec fruit-eating bat
- Gervais's fruit-eating bat
- Silver fruit-eating bat
- Gnome fruit-eating bat
- Pygmy fruit-eating bat
- Toltec fruit-eating bat
- Thomas's fruit-eating bat
- Common vampire bat
- White-winged vampire bat
- Hairy-legged vampire bat
- Velvety fruit-eating bat
- Brown flower bat
- Buffy flower bat
- Commissaris's long-tongued bat
- Gray long-tongued bat
- Western long-tongued bat
- Pallas's long-tongued bat
- Davies's big-eared bat
- Tricolored big-eared bat
- Underwood's long-tongued bat
- Yellow-throated big-eared bat
- Dark long-tongued bat
- Chestnut long-tongued bat
- Lonchophylla concava
- Handley's nectar bat
- Godman's nectar bat
- Orange nectar bat
- Thomas's nectar bat
- Tomes's sword-nosed bat
- Pygmy round-eared bat
- Carriker's round-eared bat
- Davis's round-eared bat
- Schultz's round-eared bat
- White-throated round-eared bat
- Long-legged bat
- California leaf-nosed bat
- Waterhouse's leaf-nosed bat
- MacConnell's bat
- Hairy big-eared bat
- Little big-eared bat
- Common big-eared bat
- White-bellied big-eared bat
- Sanborn's big-eared bat
- Schmidts's big-eared bat
- Golden bat
- Cozumelan golden bat
- Striped hairy-nosed bat
- Insular single leaf bat
- Leach's single leaf bat
- Pale-faced bat
- Cuban flower bat
- Cuban fig-eating bat
- Pale spear-nosed bat
- Lesser spear-nosed bat
- Greater spear-nosed bat
- Guianan spear-nosed bat
- Platyrrhinus albericoi
- Eldorado broad-nosed bat
- Short-headed broad-nosed bat
- Thomas's broad-nosed bat
- Heller's broad-nosed bat
- Buffy broad-nosed bat
- White-lined broad-nosed bat
- Platyrrhinus masu
- Platyrrhinus nigellus
- Recife broad-nosed bat
- Greater broad-nosed bat
- Ipanema bat
- Fischer's little fruit bat
- Dwarf little fruit bat
- Ega long-tongued bat
- Aratathomas's yellow-shouldered bat
- Bidentate yellow-shouldered bat
- Bogotá yellow-shouldered bat
- Hairy yellow-shouldered bat
- Little yellow-shouldered bat
- Highland yellow-shouldered bat
- Louis's yellow-shouldered bat
- Greater yellow-shouldered bat
- Talamancan yellow-shouldered bat
- Tschudi's yellow-shouldered bat
- Tilda's yellow-shouldered bat
- Stripe-headed round-eared bat
- Fringe-lipped bat
- Niceforo's big-eared bat
- Tent-making bat
- Brown tent-making bat
- Northern little yellow-eared bat
- Bidentate yellow-eared bat
- Brock's yellow-eared bat
- Striped yellow-eared bat
- Great stripe-faced bat

==== Slit-faced bats ====
- Bate's slit-faced bat
- Andersen's slit-faced bat
- Gambian slit-faced bat
- Large slit-faced bat
- Hairy slit-faced bat
- Intermediate slit-faced bat
- Large-eared slit-faced bat
- Dwarf slit-faced bat
- Egyptian slit-faced bat
- Wood's slit-faced bat

==== Other microbat species ====
- Heart-nosed bat
- Lesueur's hairy bat
- Angolan hairy bat
- Thumbless bat
- Yellow-winged bat
- Greater false vampire bat
- Lesser false vampire bat
- Madagascar sucker-footed bat
- Western sucker-footed bat
- Mexican greater funnel-eared bat
- Mexican funnel-eared bat
- Trinidadian funnel-eared bat
- Lesser bulldog bat
- Greater bulldog bat
- Gervais's funnel-eared bat
- Lesser mouse-tailed bat
- Greater mouse-tailed bat
- Small mouse-tailed bat
- Peter's disk-winged bat
- Spix's disk-winged bat

== Elephant shrews ==
- Short-snouted elephant shrew
- Cape elephant shrew
- Bushveld elephant shrew
- Eastern rock elephant shrew
- North African elephant shrew
- Rufous elephant shrew
- Western rock elephant shrew
- Namib round-eared sengi
- Etendeka round-eared sengi
- Karoo round-eared sengi
- Four-toed elephant shrew
- Black and rufous sengi
- Chequered sengi

== Treeshrews ==
- Madras treeshrew
- Northern smooth-tailed treeshrew
- Pen-tailed treeshrew
- Northern treeshrew
- Common treeshrew
- Slender treeshrew
- Horsfield's treeshrew
- Long-footed treeshrew
- Pygmy treeshrew
- Mountain treeshrew
- Palawan treeshrew
- Painted treeshrew
- Ruddy treeshrew
- Large treeshrew
- Mindanao treeshrew

== Hyraxes ==
- Southern tree hyrax
- Western tree hyrax
- Yellow-spotted rock hyrax
- Rock hyrax

== Other mammal species ==
- Philippine flying lemur
- Kiang
- Sunda flying lemur
- Aardvark
- Short-beaked echidna

== See also ==
- Lists of IUCN Red List least concern species
- List of near threatened mammals
- List of vulnerable mammals
- List of endangered mammals
- List of critically endangered mammals
- List of recently extinct mammals
- List of data deficient mammals
