= Oxymycterus hucucha =

Conservation status
- Endangered (IUCN 3.1)

Scientific classification
- Kingdom: Animalia
- Phylum: Chordata
- Class: Mammalia
- Order: Rodentia
- Family: Cricetidae
- Subfamily: Sigmodontinae
- Genus: Oxymycterus
- Species: O. hucucha

Binomial name
- Oxymycterus hucucha Hinojosa, Anderson, and Patton, 1987

Species of rodent

Oxymycterus hucucha, also known as the Quechuan hocicudo, is a species of rodent in the genus Oxymycterus of family Cricetidae from South America. It is found only in a small region of the Andes in central Bolivia, where it lives in cloud forest at altitudes from 2,600 to 3,000 m (8,530 to 9,840 ft).

Exceptionally small for its genus, O. hucucha was first recognized as new when a specimen was caught in 1984 in the Siberia Cloud Forest in Bolivia's Cochabamba Department, near the border of Santa Cruz Department. It was recognized as an Oxymycterus by its long claws relative to other, sympatric small akodontine rodents. Two other specimens caught nearby in 1955 and 1979 were then recognized as pertaining to the same species; one had been misidentified as Akodon mimus. In 1987, O. hucucha and another small Oxymycterus, O. hiska from Peru, were named and described in an American Museum Novitates paper by Flavio Hinojosa, Sydney Anderson, and James Patton. O. hucucha's specific name is derived from hucucha, which means "mouse" in Quechua, the local Amerindian language in the region where the species is found.

It is similar in size to O. hiska, but slightly smaller, and the fur of the upperparts is more pale and reddish. Furthermore, the skull is narrower, the palate is longer, and the upper incisors are oriented more to the front, among other differences. Its coloration resembles that of some young O. inca, a larger Oxymycterus that occurs in the same region, but the latter have larger feet.

The IUCN lists its conservation status as "endangered" because it has a small distribution, its habitat is being destroyed, and it is not known from any protected areas.

== Literature cited ==
- Hinojosa P., F.; Anderson, S.; and Patton, J.L. (1987). "Two new species of Oxymycterus (Rodentia) from Peru and Bolivia". American Museum Novitates (2898): 1–17. hdl:2246/5182.
- Musser, G. G.; Carleton, M. D. (2005). "Superfamily Muroidea". In Wilson, D. E.; Reeder, D. M. (eds.). Mammal Species of the World: A Taxonomic and Geographic Reference (3rd ed.). Johns Hopkins University Press. pp. 894–1531. ISBN 978-0-8018-8221-0. OCLC 62265494.
