= Ravine hocicudo =

Conservation status
- Vulnerable (IUCN 3.1)

Scientific classification
- Kingdom: Animalia
- Phylum: Chordata
- Class: Mammalia
- Order: Rodentia
- Family: Cricetidae
- Subfamily: Sigmodontinae
- Genus: Oxymycterus
- Species: O. wayku

Binomial name
- Oxymycterus wayku Jayat, D'Elía, Pardiñas, Miotti & Ortiz, 2008

Species of rodent

The ravine hocicudo (Oxymycterus wayku) is a rodent species from South America. It is found in Argentina.
