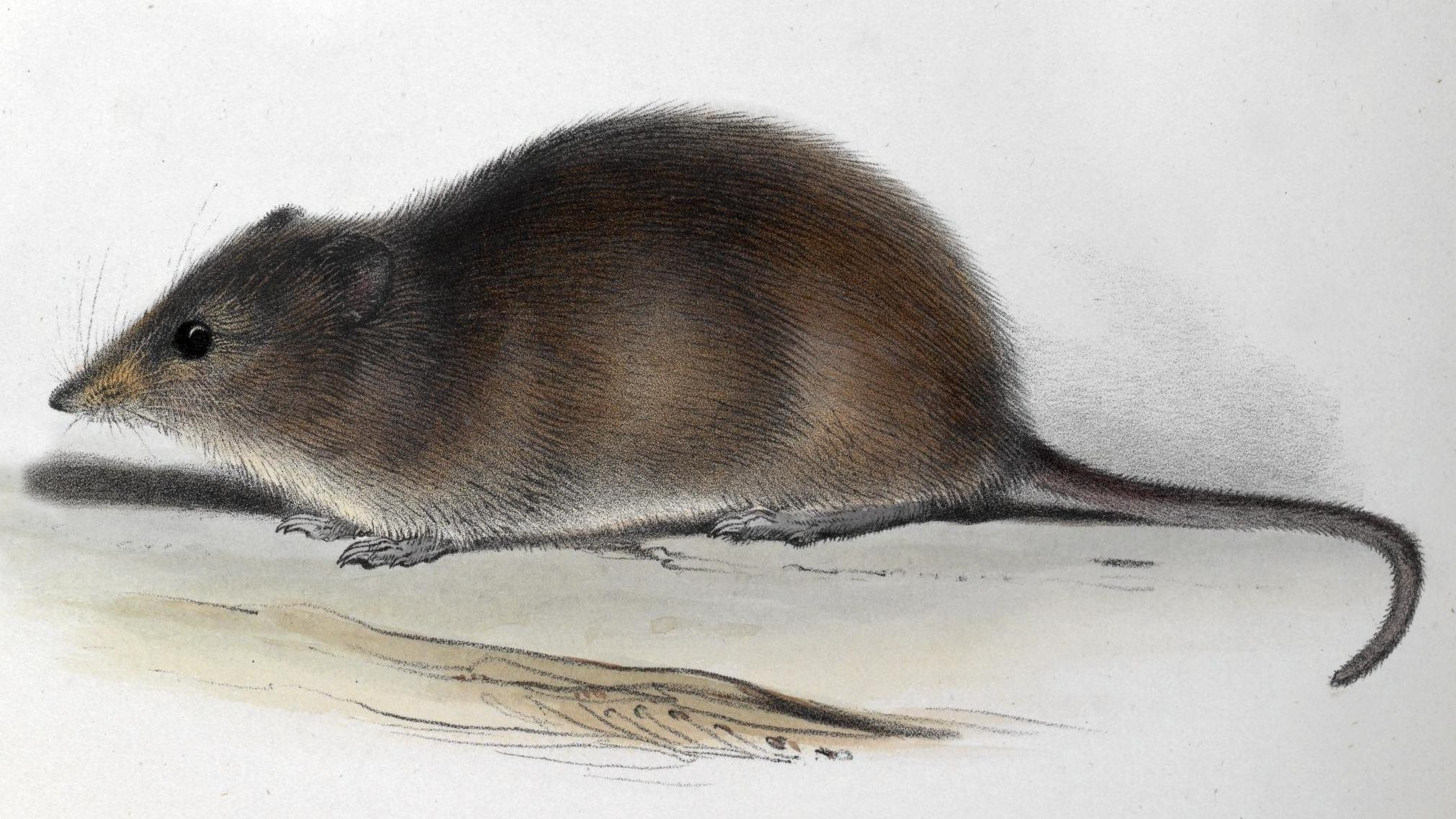
- Oxymycterus nasutus

Scientific classification
- Kingdom: Animalia
- Phylum: Chordata
- Class: Mammalia
- Order: Rodentia
- Family: Cricetidae
- Subfamily: Sigmodontinae
- Tribe: Akodontini
- Genus: Oxymycterus; Waterhouse, 1837

Type species
- Mus nasutus Waterhouse, 1837

Species
- Oxymycterus akodontius; Oxymycterus amazonicus; Oxymycterus angularis; Oxymycterus caparaoe; Oxymycterus dasytrichus; Oxymycterus delator; Oxymycterus hiska; Oxymycterus hispidus; Oxymycterus hucucha; Oxymycterus inca; Oxymycterus itapeby; Oxymycterus josei; Oxymycterus nasutus; Oxymycterus paramensis; Oxymycterus quaestor; Oxymycterus roberti; Oxymycterus rufus; Oxymycterus wayku

= Oxymycterus =

Hocicudos Temporal range: Middle Pleistocene - Recent

Genus of rodents

Oxymycterus is a genus of rat-like rodents commonly known as hocicudos. They are endemic to South America. As of April 2019, the genus contains the following 16 species:

- O. akodontius Thomas, 1921 Argentine hocicudo
- O. amazonicus Herzhkovitz, 1994 Amazon hocicudo
- O. angularis Thomas, 1909 angular hocicudo
- O. caparaoe Hershkovitz, 1998 Caparao hocicudo
- O. dasytrichus (Schinz, 1821) Atlantic Forest hocicudo
- O. delator Thomas, 1903 spy hocicudo
- O. hiska Hinojosa, Anderson & Patton, 1987 small hocicudo
- O. hispidus Pictet, 1843 hispid hocicudo
- O. hucucha Hinojosa, Anderson & Patton, 1987 Quechuan hocicudo
- O. inca Thomas, 1900 Incan hocicudo
- O. itapeby Peçanha et al. 2019 Itapevi hocicudo
- O. josei Hoffmann, Lessa & Smith, 2002 Cook's hocicudo
- O. nasutus (Waterhouse, 1837) long-nosed hocicudo
- O. paramensis Paramo hocicudo
- O. quaestor Thomas, 1903 Quaestor hocicudo
- O. roberti Thomas, 1901 Robert's hocicudo
- O. rufus (Fischer, 1814) red hocicudo
- O. wayku Jayat et al., 2008 ravine hocicudo
