= Itapevi hocicudo =

Scientific classification
- Domain: Eukaryota
- Kingdom: Animalia
- Phylum: Chordata
- Class: Mammalia
- Order: Rodentia
- Family: Cricetidae
- Subfamily: Sigmodontinae
- Genus: Oxymycterus
- Species: O. itapeby

Binomial name
- Oxymycterus itapeby Peçanha et al. 2019

Species of rodent

The Itapevi hocicudo (Oxymycterus itapeby) is a rodent species from South America. It is found in Brazil.
