= Cook's hocicudo =

Conservation status
- Near Threatened (IUCN 3.1)

Scientific classification
- Kingdom: Animalia
- Phylum: Chordata
- Class: Mammalia
- Order: Rodentia
- Family: Cricetidae
- Subfamily: Sigmodontinae
- Genus: Oxymycterus
- Species: O. josei

Binomial name
- Oxymycterus josei Hoffmann, Lessa & Smith, 2002

Species of rodent

Cook's hocicudo (Oxymycterus josei) is a species of rodent in the family Cricetidae. It is found only in southern Uruguay, where it lives in wetlands, moist grasslands and scrub. The specifies is named after American zoologist Joseph "José" A. Cook.
