= Robert's hocicudo =

Robert's Hocicudo

Conservation status
- Least Concern (IUCN 3.1)

Scientific classification
- Kingdom: Animalia
- Phylum: Chordata
- Class: Mammalia
- Order: Rodentia
- Family: Cricetidae
- Subfamily: Sigmodontinae
- Genus: Oxymycterus
- Species: O. roberti

Binomial name
- Oxymycterus roberti Thomas, 1901

Species of rodent

Robert's hocicudo (Oxymycterus roberti) is a rodent species from South America. It is found in Brazil and Paraguay.
