= Spy hocicudo =

Conservation status
- Least Concern (IUCN 3.1)

Scientific classification
- Domain: Eukaryota
- Kingdom: Animalia
- Phylum: Chordata
- Class: Mammalia
- Order: Rodentia
- Family: Cricetidae
- Subfamily: Sigmodontinae
- Genus: Oxymycterus
- Species: O. delator

Binomial name
- Oxymycterus delator Thomas, 1903

Species of rodent

The spy hocicudo (Oxymycterus delator) is a species of rodent in the family Cricetidae. It is found only in Paraguay.
