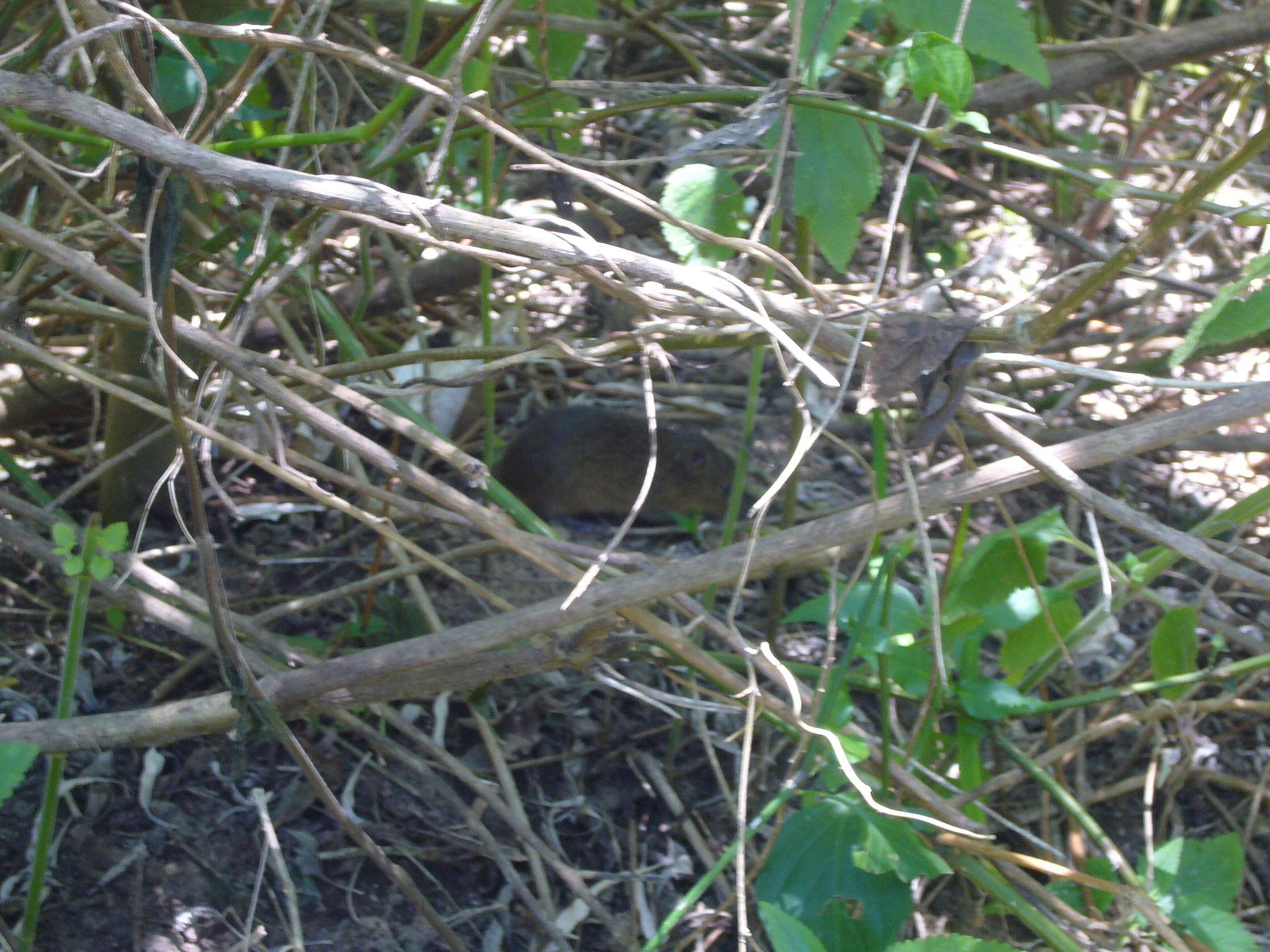

Conservation status
- Least Concern (IUCN 3.1)

Scientific classification
- Kingdom: Animalia
- Phylum: Chordata
- Class: Mammalia
- Order: Rodentia
- Family: Cricetidae
- Subfamily: Sigmodontinae
- Genus: Oxymycterus
- Species: O. rufus

Binomial name
- Oxymycterus rufus Fischer, 1814

= Red hocicudo =

Species of rodent

The red hocicudo (Oxymycterus rufus) is a rodent species from South America. It is found in Argentina, Brazil and Uruguay.

== Ecology ==
The red hocicudo has been found to be one of the most heavily ectoparasite-infested rodents in a village studied in the Paraná Delta area. Of the species of rodent caught, it ranked top alongside the Azara's grass mouse (Akodon azarae). In the tests, 585 fleas were found, 2404 ticks in the family Ixodidae, 2603 mites in the order Mesostigmata and 3745 lice. In another study in a marshy area of Buenos Aires Province, 93% of the red hocicudos studied had parasites, with eight species of parasitic arthropod being detected.
