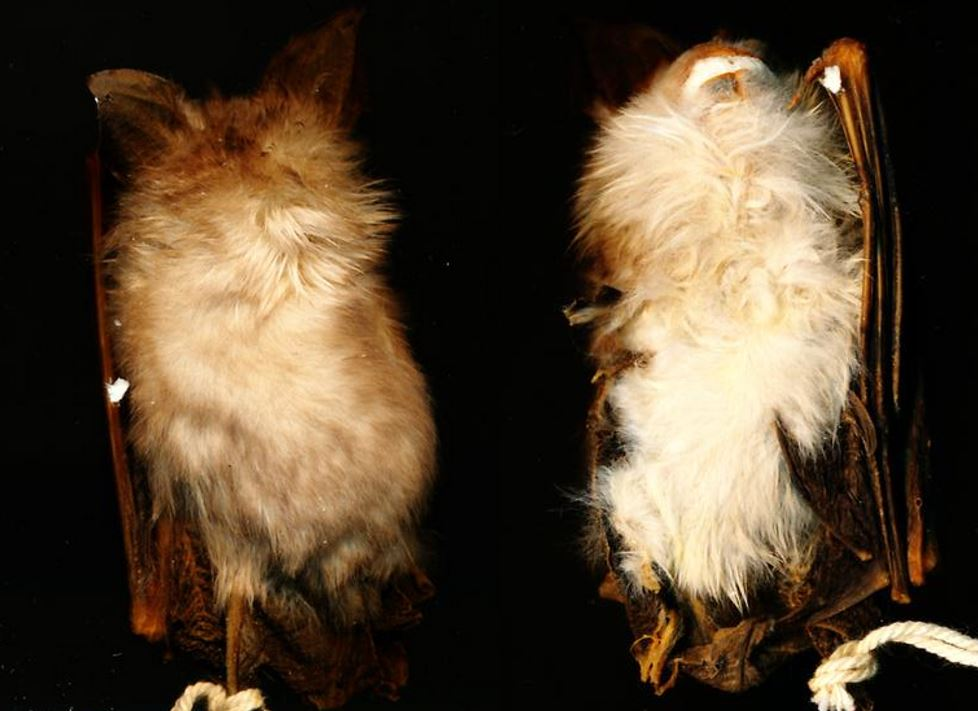

Conservation status
- Least Concern (IUCN 3.1)

Scientific classification
- Kingdom: Animalia
- Phylum: Chordata
- Class: Mammalia
- Order: Chiroptera
- Family: Rhinolophidae
- Genus: Rhinolophus
- Species: R. bocharicus

Binomial name
- Rhinolophus bocharicus Kastschenko & Akimov, 1917
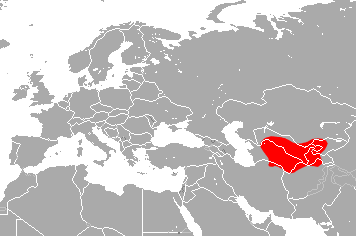
- Bokhara horseshoe bat range

= Bokhara horseshoe bat =

Species of bat

The Bokhara horseshoe bat (Rhinolophus bocharicus) is a species of bat in the family Rhinolophidae. It is found in Afghanistan, Turkmenistan, Uzbekistan, and possibly in Iran and Pakistan.
