= Paramo hocicudo =

Conservation status
- Least Concern (IUCN 3.1)

Scientific classification
- Kingdom: Animalia
- Phylum: Chordata
- Class: Mammalia
- Order: Rodentia
- Family: Cricetidae
- Subfamily: Sigmodontinae
- Genus: Oxymycterus
- Species: O. paramensis

Binomial name
- Oxymycterus paramensis Thomas, 1902

Species of mammal

The Paramo hocicudo (Oxymycterus paramensis) is a species of rodent in the family Cricetidae. It is found in Argentina, Bolivia, and Peru. The Argentine hocicudo is sometimes considered conspecific.
