= Thick-thumbed myotis =

Conservation status
- Least Concern (IUCN 3.1)

Scientific classification
- Kingdom: Animalia
- Phylum: Chordata
- Class: Mammalia
- Order: Chiroptera
- Family: Vespertilionidae
- Genus: Myotis
- Species: M. rosseti

Binomial name
- Myotis rosseti Oey, 1951
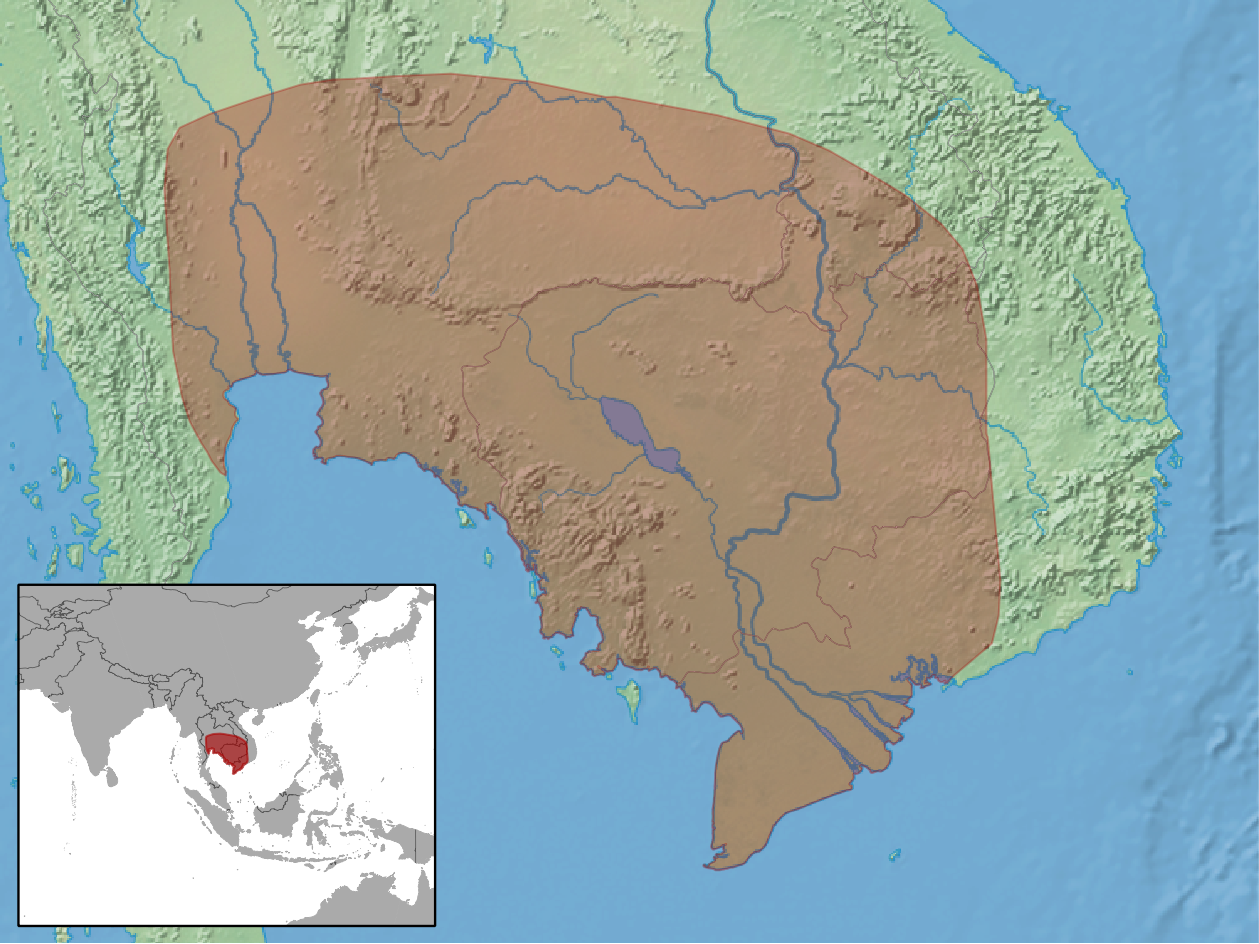

Species of bat

The thick-thumbed myotis (Myotis rosseti) is a species of vesper bat. It can be found in Cambodia, Laos, and Thailand.
