= Pallid large-footed myotis =

Conservation status
- Least Concern (IUCN 3.1)

Scientific classification
- Kingdom: Animalia
- Phylum: Chordata
- Class: Mammalia
- Order: Chiroptera
- Family: Vespertilionidae
- Genus: Myotis
- Species: M. macrotarsus

Binomial name
- Myotis macrotarsus Waterhouse, 1845
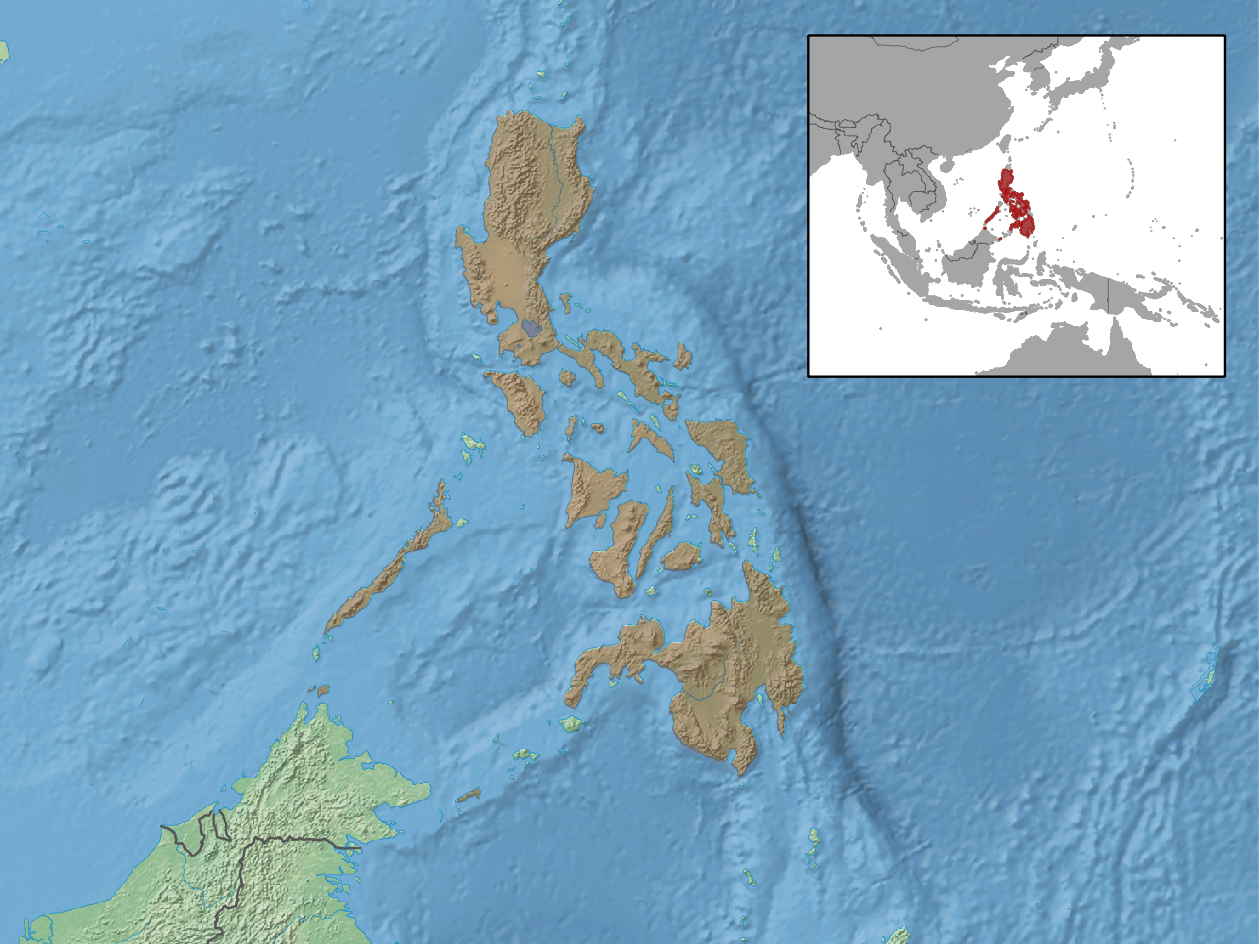

Synonyms
- Vespertilio macrotarsus Waterhouse, 1845

Species of bat

The pallid large-footed myotis or Philippine large-footed myotis (Myotis macrotarsus) is a species of vesper bat. It can be found in the following countries: Malaysia and Philippines. It is found in caves and arable land.
