= Angular hocicudo =

Conservation status
- Least Concern (IUCN 3.1)

Scientific classification
- Kingdom: Animalia
- Phylum: Chordata
- Class: Mammalia
- Order: Rodentia
- Family: Cricetidae
- Subfamily: Sigmodontinae
- Genus: Oxymycterus
- Species: O. angularis

Binomial name
- Oxymycterus angularis Thomas, 1909

Species of rodent

The angular hocicudo (Oxymycterus angularis) is a rodent species from South America. It is found in Brazil.
