= Amazonian hocicudo =

Conservation status
- Least Concern (IUCN 3.1)

Scientific classification
- Kingdom: Animalia
- Phylum: Chordata
- Class: Mammalia
- Order: Rodentia
- Family: Cricetidae
- Subfamily: Sigmodontinae
- Genus: Oxymycterus
- Species: O. amazonicus

Binomial name
- Oxymycterus amazonicus Hershkovitz, 1994

Species of rodent

The Amazonian hocicudo (Oxymycterus amazonicus) is a species of rodent in the family Cricetidae from South America. It is found in the Amazon basin in Brazil where it lives in moist lowland forest. It is a common species with a large range and is rated by the IUCN as being of "least concern".

== Description ==
The adult Amazonian hocicudo grows to a head-and-body length of about 140 to 148 mm (5.5 to 5.8 in), with a relatively short tail of 86 to 95 mm (3.4 to 3.7 in). The fur on the back and the sides is generally dark brown, but some individuals are more rufous brown. The underparts are orangish with the throat being paler than other parts, and sometimes nearly white. Species identification is helped by measuring the length of the hind feet and the ears. In this case, the hind feet, including the large claws, are 28 to 29 mm (1.10 to 1.14 in) long and the ears 16 to 20 mm (0.63 to 0.79 in).

== Distribution ==
The Amazonian hocicudo is native to the Amazon basin in Brazil. Its range extends from the Amazon River southwards to the Tocantins River and Madeira River, and the northwestern part of the Mato Grosso, as well as westwards to the Jamari River. Its habitat is humid lowland forest, but it has also been found in secondary-growth woodland and in scrubby areas bordering cassava and rice fields.

== Ecology ==
The Amazonian hocicudo is preyed on by snakes, as demonstrated by the fact that one specimen was found in the stomach of a pit viper (Bothrops spp).

== Status ==
The Amazonian hocicudo occurs over a wide range, and although the population trend is unknown, it is described as being a widespread and common species. No specific threats have been identified and it occurs in a number of protected areas, so the International Union for Conservation of Nature has assessed it as being a species of "least concern".
