= Hispid hocicudo =

Conservation status
- Least Concern (IUCN 3.1)

Scientific classification
- Kingdom: Animalia
- Phylum: Chordata
- Class: Mammalia
- Order: Rodentia
- Family: Cricetidae
- Subfamily: Sigmodontinae
- Genus: Oxymycterus
- Species: O. hispidus

Binomial name
- Oxymycterus hispidus Pictet, 1843

Species of rodent

The hispid hocicudo (Oxymycterus hispidus) is a species of rodent native to South America. It is found in Argentina and Brazil, in the Atlantic Forest.
