= Caparaó hocicudo =

Conservation status
- Least Concern (IUCN 3.1)

Scientific classification
- Kingdom: Animalia
- Phylum: Chordata
- Class: Mammalia
- Order: Rodentia
- Family: Cricetidae
- Subfamily: Sigmodontinae
- Genus: Oxymycterus
- Species: O. caparaoe

Binomial name
- Oxymycterus caparaoe Hershkovitz, 1998

Species of rodent

The Caparaó hocicudo (Oxymycterus caparaoe) (Note: Incorrect subsequent spellings of the specific name caparaoe include: caparaonense and caparoae.) is a rodent species from South America. It is endemic to Brazil where it is found in the Pico da Bandeira mountain range.

== Description ==
The Caparaó hocicudo grows to a head-and-body length of between 110 and 139 mm (4.3 and 5.5 in), with a moderately long tail of between 80 and 104 mm (3.1 and 4.1 in). The hind feet, including the claws, are 27 to 31 mm (1.06 to 1.22 in) long and the ears are 18 to 20 mm (0.71 to 0.79 in). The snout is elongated making the head long and narrow. The fur is rather long and lax. The dorsal hairs have grey bases, orange midsections and blackish tips, giving an overall dark brown colour. The flanks have a wider orange band giving them a paler appearance. The underparts are orange, the individual hairs having grey bases. The upper surfaces of the hind feet are greyish brown.

== Distribution and habitat ==
The Caparaó hocicudo is found only in the Pico da Bandeira mountain range on the border between Espírito Santo and Minas Gerais states at altitudes between about 2,100 and 2,400 m (6,900 and 7,900 ft). This mountain range is completely isolated from other mountain areas and is surrounded by lower lying land. These mountains are topped by cool, moist grassland and this hocicudo is plentiful in areas of bunchgrass (Cortaderia spp) and Andean bamboo (Chusquea).
