= Quaestor hocicudo =

Conservation status
- Least Concern (IUCN 3.1)

Scientific classification
- Kingdom: Animalia
- Phylum: Chordata
- Class: Mammalia
- Order: Rodentia
- Family: Cricetidae
- Subfamily: Sigmodontinae
- Genus: Oxymycterus
- Species: O. quaestor

Binomial name
- Oxymycterus quaestor Thomas, 1903

Species of rodent

The quaestor hocicudo (Oxymycterus quaestor) is a species of rodent in the family Cricetidae. It is found in southeastern Brazil and northeastern Argentina, where it lives in forest and moist and dry scrub.
