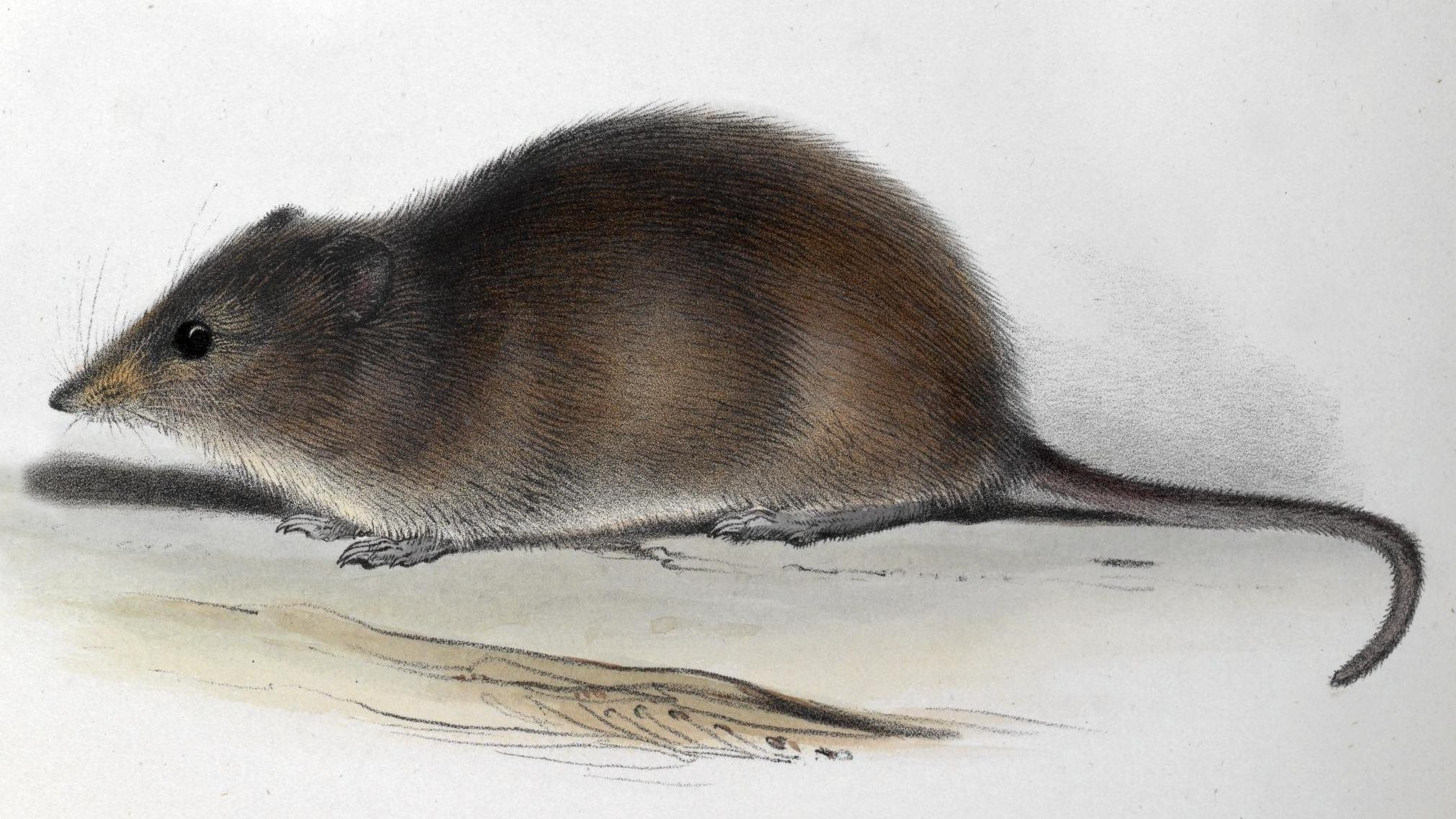

Conservation status
- Least Concern (IUCN 3.1)

Scientific classification
- Kingdom: Animalia
- Phylum: Chordata
- Class: Mammalia
- Order: Rodentia
- Family: Cricetidae
- Subfamily: Sigmodontinae
- Genus: Oxymycterus
- Species: O. nasutus

Binomial name
- Oxymycterus nasutus (Waterhouse, 1837)

Synonyms
- Mus nasutus Waterhouse, 1837

= Long-nosed hocicudo =

Species of rodent

The long-nosed hocicudo (Oxymycterus nasutus) is a South American rodent species found in southeastern Brazil and Uruguay.

== Diet ==
It hunts grubs and worms under the cover of leaves, logs, and stones.

== Description ==
It has a long, flexible nose, and usually utilizes the tunnels and pathways created by other rodents.
