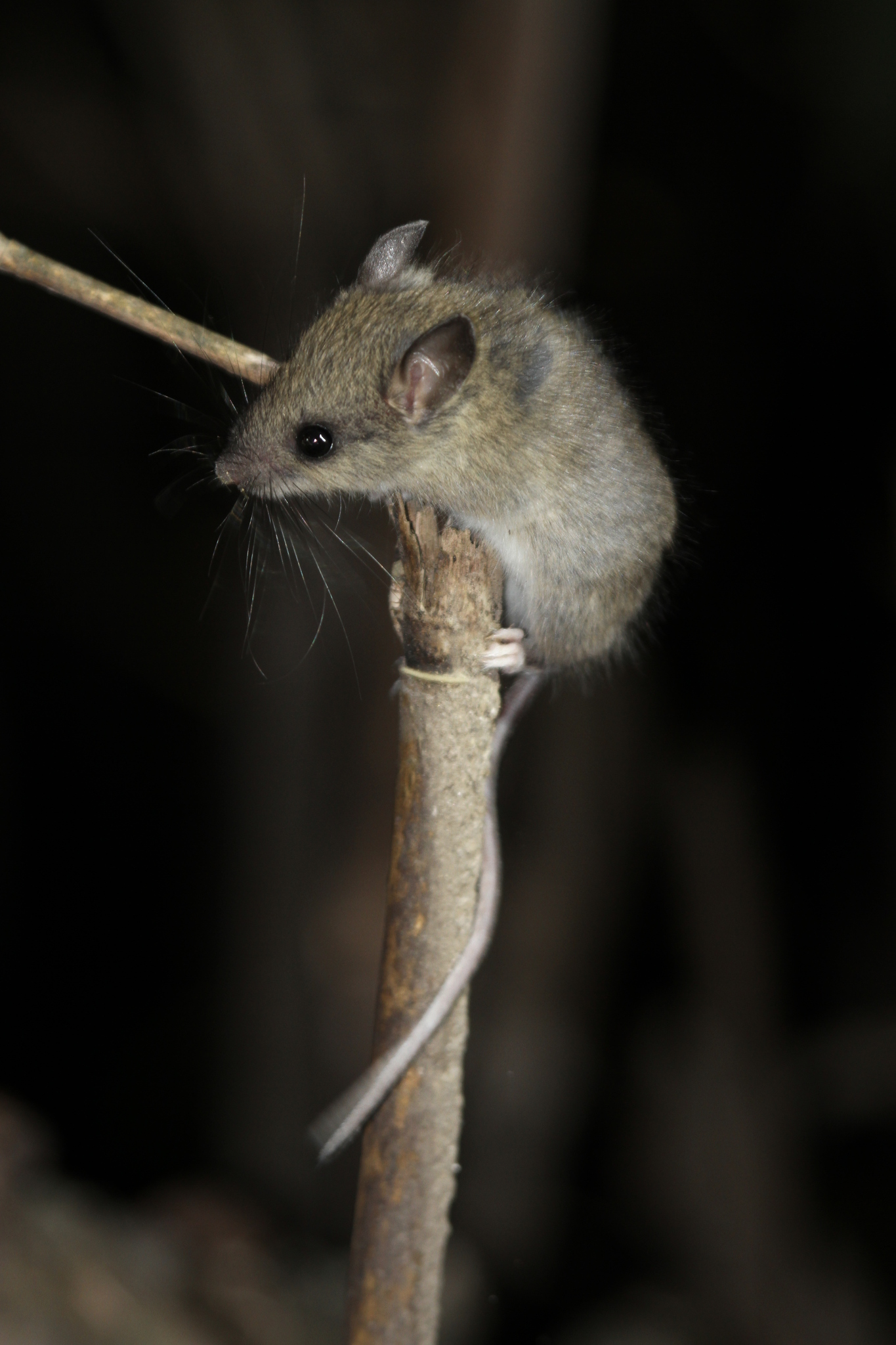

Conservation status
- Least Concern (IUCN 3.1)

Scientific classification
- Domain: Eukaryota
- Kingdom: Animalia
- Phylum: Chordata
- Class: Mammalia
- Order: Rodentia
- Family: Sminthidae
- Genus: Sicista
- Species: S. concolor

Binomial name
- Sicista concolor (Büchner, 1892)

= Sicista concolor =

Species of rodent

Sicista concolor, the Chinese birch mouse, is a species of rodent in the family Sminthidae. It is native to China, India and Pakistan.
