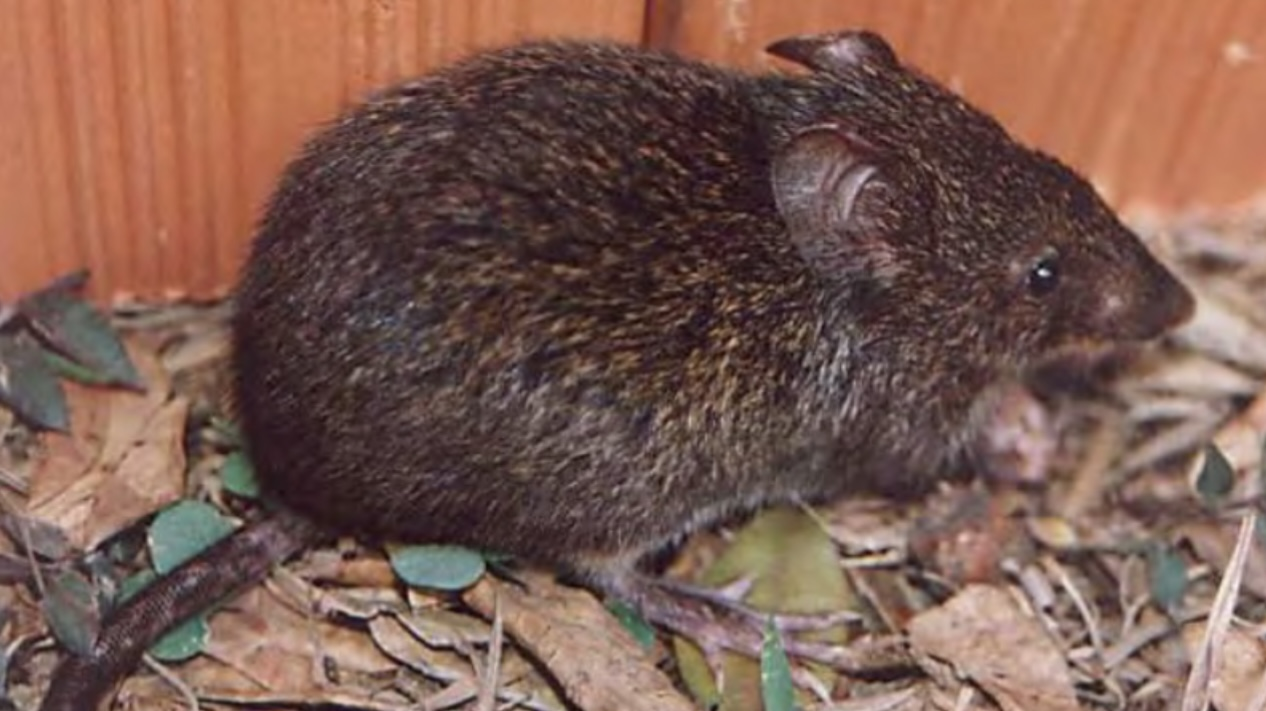

Conservation status
- Least Concern (IUCN 3.1)

Scientific classification
- Kingdom: Animalia
- Phylum: Chordata
- Class: Mammalia
- Infraclass: Placentalia
- Order: Rodentia
- Family: Cricetidae
- Subfamily: Sigmodontinae
- Genus: Oxymycterus
- Species: O. dasytrichus

Binomial name
- Oxymycterus dasytrichus (Schinz, 1821)

= Atlantic Forest hocicudo =

Species of rodent

The Atlantic Forest hocicudo (Oxymycterus dasytrichus) is a species of rodent in the family Cricetidae. It is found only in southeastern Brazil, where it lives in the Atlantic Forest and associated wetlands at altitudes from sea level to 800 m (2,600 ft).
