= Small hocicudo =

Conservation status
- Least Concern (IUCN 3.1)

Scientific classification
- Kingdom: Animalia
- Phylum: Chordata
- Class: Mammalia
- Order: Rodentia
- Family: Cricetidae
- Subfamily: Sigmodontinae
- Genus: Oxymycterus
- Species: O. hiska

Binomial name
- Oxymycterus hiska Hinojosa, Anderson & Patton, 1987

Species of rodent

The small hocicudo (Oxymycterus hiska) is a little known species of rodent in the family Cricetidae. It is found in Bolivia and Peru on the eastern slopes of the Andes.

== Distribution ==
The species inhabits humid montane forests, preferring primary and secondary Polylepis woodland, on the eastern slopes of the Andes in Peru and Bolivia, at altitudes of 600–3,500 m. It appears to be rare in Peru but more common in Bolivia. The species may also be present in some cultivated areas. Population sizes appear to be stable.

== Ecology ==
The small hocicudo is active during both day and night, and has terrestrial habits. It feeds by digging small invertebrate prey from the litter. Not much is known about reproduction, but breeding at the end of the rainy season (March–April) has been suggested.
