= Incan hocicudo =

Incan Hocicudo

Conservation status
- Least Concern (IUCN 3.1)

Scientific classification
- Kingdom: Animalia
- Phylum: Chordata
- Class: Mammalia
- Order: Rodentia
- Family: Cricetidae
- Subfamily: Sigmodontinae
- Genus: Oxymycterus
- Species: O. inca

Binomial name
- Oxymycterus inca Thomas, 1900

Species of rodent

The Incan hocicudo (Oxymycterus inca) is a species of rodent in the family Cricetidae. It is found in Bolivia and Peru.
