= List of mammals of Bolivia =

This is a list of the mammal species recorded in Bolivia. There are 300 mammal species in Bolivia, of which two are critically endangered, five are endangered, seventeen are vulnerable, and twelve are near threatened.

The following tags are used to highlight each species' conservation status as assessed by the International Union for Conservation of Nature:

EX	Extinct	No reasonable doubt that the last individual has died.
EW	Extinct in the wild	Known only to survive in captivity or as a naturalized populations well outside its previous range.
CR	Critically endangered	The species is in imminent risk of extinction in the wild.
EN	Endangered	The species is facing an extremely high risk of extinction in the wild.
VU	Vulnerable	The species is facing a high risk of extinction in the wild.
NT	Near threatened	The species does not meet any of the criteria that would categorise it as risking extinction but it is likely to do so in the future.
LC	Least concern	There are no current identifiable risks to the species.
DD	Data deficient	There is inadequate information to make an assessment of the risks to this species.

Some species were assessed using an earlier set of criteria. Species assessed using this system have the following instead of near threatened and least concern categories:

LR/cd	Lower risk/conservation dependent	Species which were the focus of conservation programmes and may have moved into a higher risk category if that programme was discontinued.
LR/nt	Lower risk/near threatened	Species which are close to being classified as vulnerable but are not the subject of conservation programmes.
LR/lc	Lower risk/least concern	Species for which there are no identifiable risks.

== Subclass: Theria ==
=== Infraclass: Eutheria ===
==== Order: Cingulata (armadillos) ====
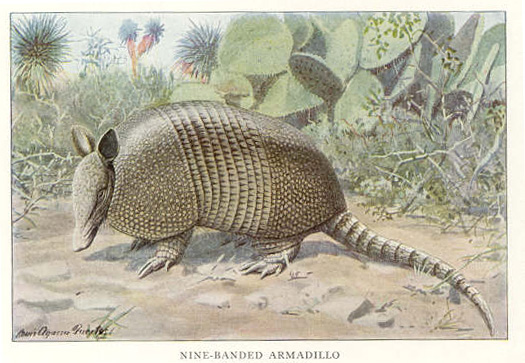
Nine-banded armadillo

The armadillos are small mammals with a bony armored shell. They are native to the Americas. There are around 20 extant species.

- Family: Dasypodidae (armadillos)
  - Subfamily: Dasypodinae
    - Genus: Dasypus
      - Greater long-nosed armadillo, D. kappleri LC
      - Nine-banded armadillo, D. novemcinctus LC
      - Seven-banded armadillo, D. septemcinctus LC
  - Subfamily: Euphractinae
    - Genus: Chaetophractus
      - Andean hairy armadillo, C. nationi VU
      - Screaming hairy armadillo, C. vellerosus LC
      - Big hairy armadillo, C. villosus LC
    - Genus: Calyptophractus
      - Greater fairy armadillo, C. retusus NT
    - Genus: Euphractus
      - Six-banded armadillo, E. sexcinctus LC
  - Subfamily: Tolypeutinae
    - Genus: Cabassous
      - Southern naked-tailed armadillo, C. unicinctus LC
    - Genus: Priodontes
      - Giant armadillo, P. maximus VU
    - Genus: Tolypeutes
      - Southern three-banded armadillo, T. matacus NT

==== Order: Pilosa (anteaters, sloths and tamanduas) ====
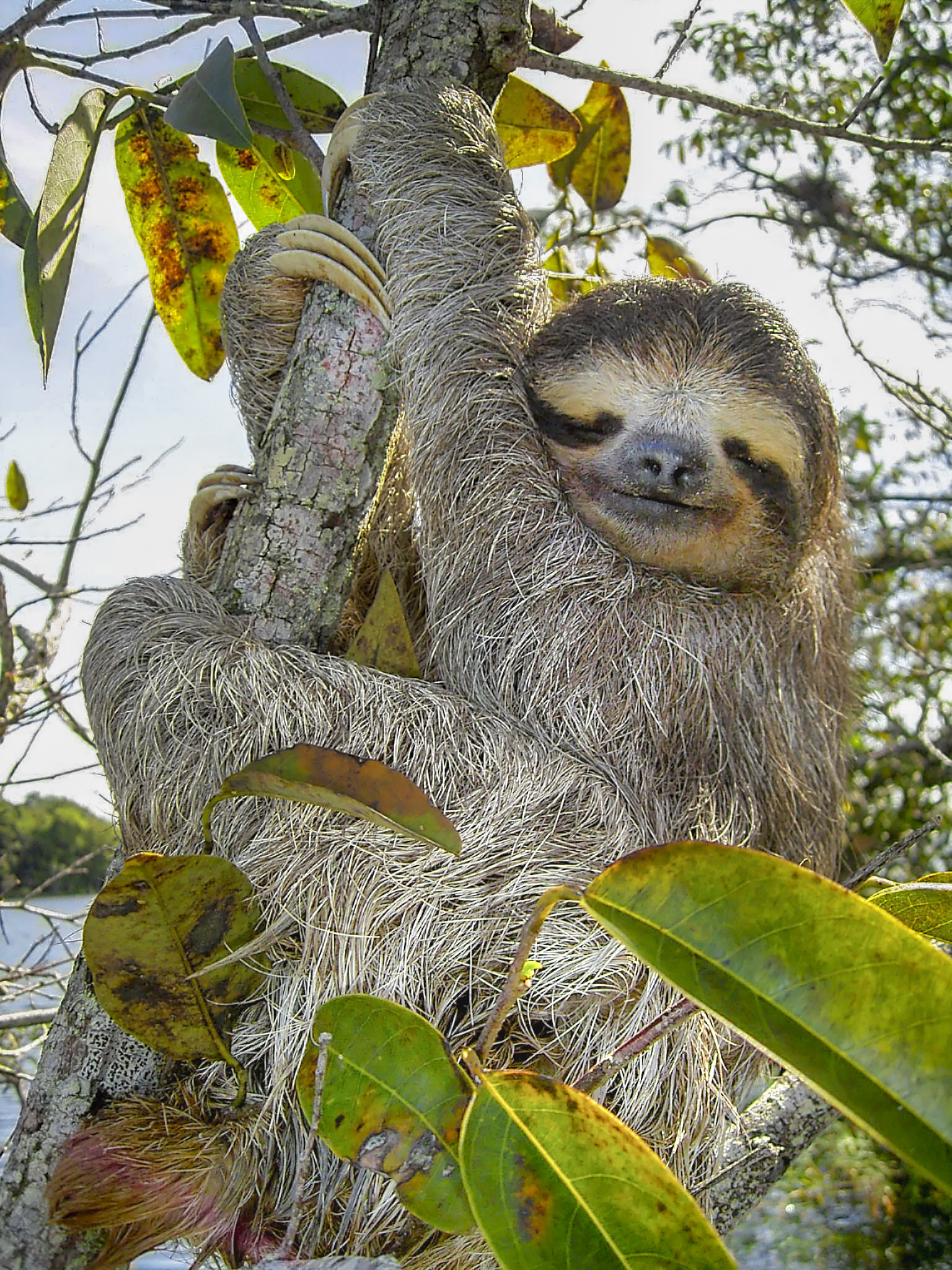
Brown-throated three-toed sloth

The order Pilosa is extant only in the Americas and includes the anteaters, sloths, and tamanduas.

- Suborder: Folivora
  - Family: Bradypodidae (three-toed sloths)
    - Genus: Bradypus
      - Brown-throated three-toed sloth, Bradypus variegatus LC
  - Family: Choloepodidae (two-toed sloths)
    - Genus: Choloepus
      - Hoffmann's two-toed sloth, Choloepus hoffmanni LC
- Suborder: Vermilingua
  - Family: Cyclopedidae
    - Genus: Cyclopes
      - Silky anteater, Cyclopes didactylus LC
  - Family: Myrmecophagidae (American anteaters)
    - Genus: Myrmecophaga
      - Giant anteater, Myrmecophaga tridactyla NT
    - Genus: Tamandua
      - Southern tamandua, Tamandua tetradactyla LC

==== Order: Primates ====
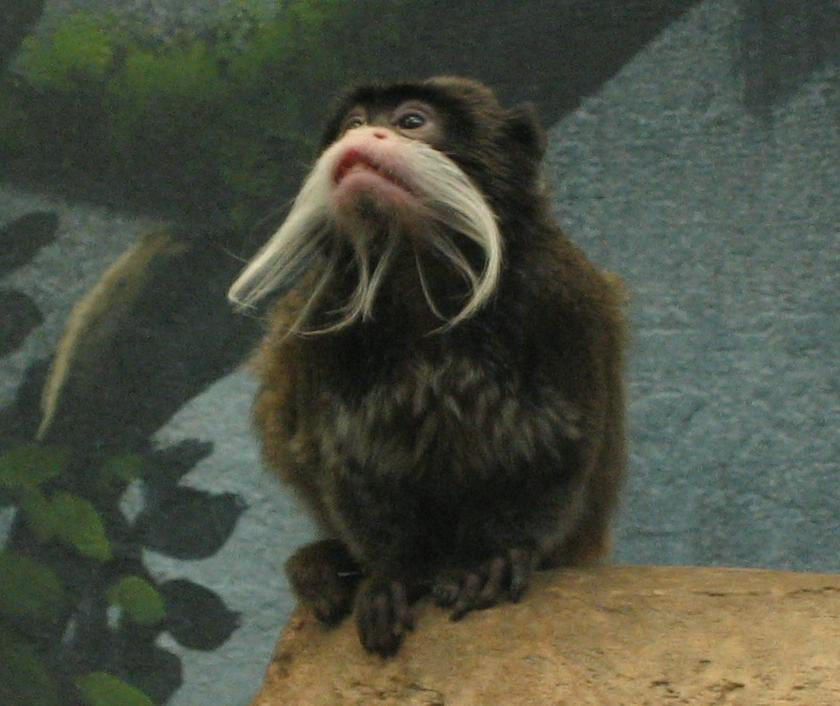
Emperor tamarin

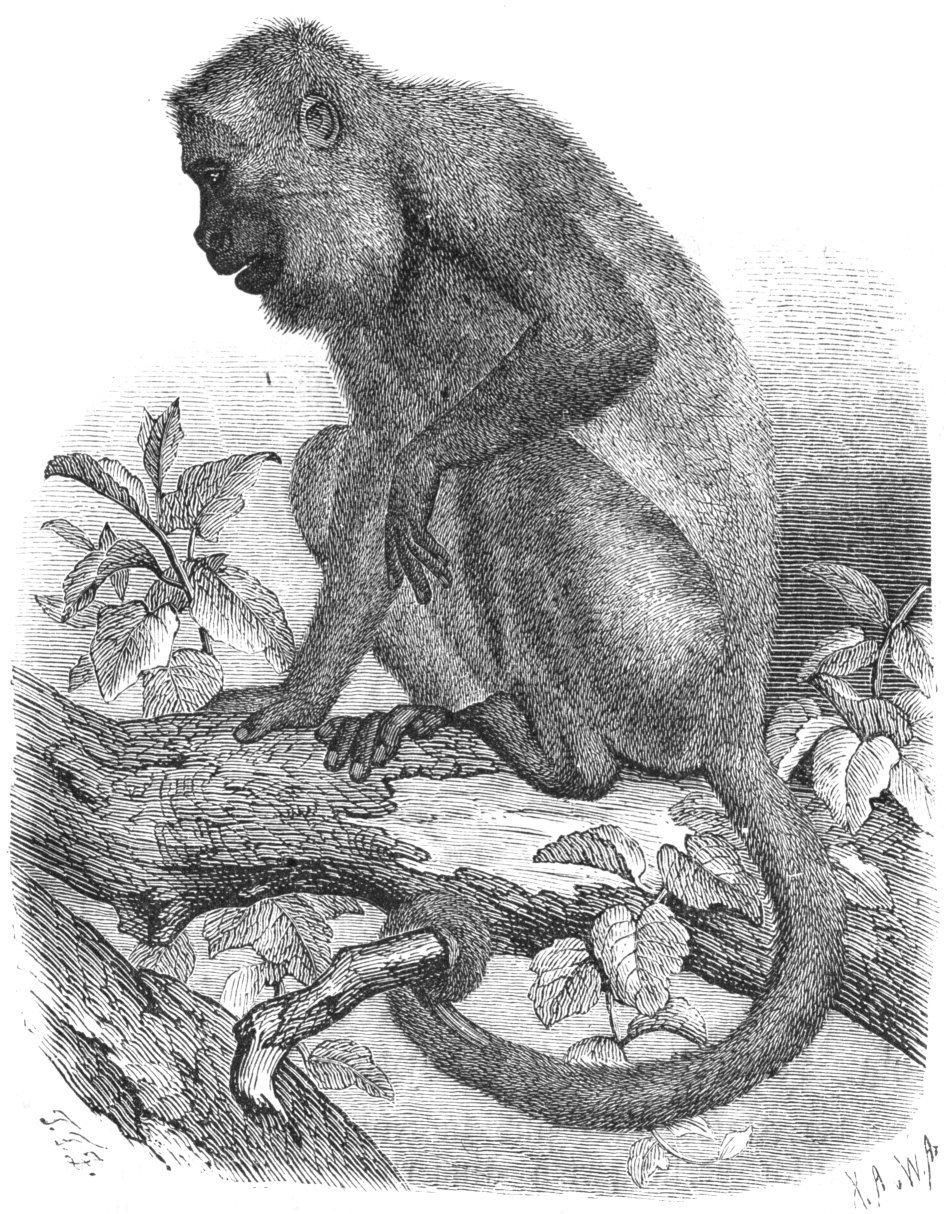
Venezuelan red howler

The order Primates contains humans and their closest relatives: lemurs, lorisoids, monkeys, and apes.

- Suborder: Haplorhini
  - Infraorder: Simiiformes
    - Parvorder: Platyrrhini (New World monkeys)
      - Family: Cebidae
        - Subfamily: Callitrichinae
          - Genus: Callithrix
            - Pygmy marmoset, Cebuella pygmaea LC
          - Genus:Leontocebus
            - Brown-mantled tamarin, Leontocebus fuscicollis LC
            - Weddell's saddle-back tamarin, Leontocebus weddelli LC
          - Genus: Saguinus
            - Emperor tamarin, Saguinus imperator LC
            - White-lipped tamarin, Saguinus labiatus LC
          - Genus: Callimico
            - Goeldi's marmoset, Callimico goeldii NT
        - Subfamily: Cebinae
          - Genus: Cebus
            - Humboldt's white-fronted capuchin, Cebus albifrons LC
            - Shock-headed capuchin, Cebus cuscinus NT
            - Spix's white-fronted capuchin, Cebus unicolor
          - Genus: Saimiri
            - Black-capped squirrel monkey, Saimiri boliviensis LC
      - Family: Aotidae
        - Genus: Aotus
          - Azara's night monkey, Aotus azarae LC
          - Black-headed night monkey, Aotus nigriceps LC
      - Family: Pitheciidae
        - Subfamily: Callicebinae
          - Genus: Callicebus
            - Brown titi, Callicebus brunneus LC
            - White-eared titi, Callicebus donacophilus LC
            - Rio Beni titi, Callicebus modestus VU
            - Ollala brothers' titi, Callicebus olallae VU
            - White-coated titi, Callicebus pallescens LC
        - Subfamily: Pitheciinae
          - Genus: Pithecia
            - Rio Tapajós saki, Pithecia irrorata LC
      - Family: Atelidae
        - Subfamily: Alouattinae
          - Genus: Alouatta
            - Black howler, Alouatta caraya LC
            - Bolivian red howler, Alouatta sara LC
            - Venezuelan red howler, Alouatta seniculus LC
        - Subfamily: Atelinae
          - Genus: Ateles
            - Peruvian spider monkey, Ateles chamek LC
          - Genus: Lagothrix
            - Gray woolly monkey, Lagothrix cana NT
            - Brown woolly monkey, Lagothrix lagothricha LR/lc

==== Order: Rodentia (rodents) ====
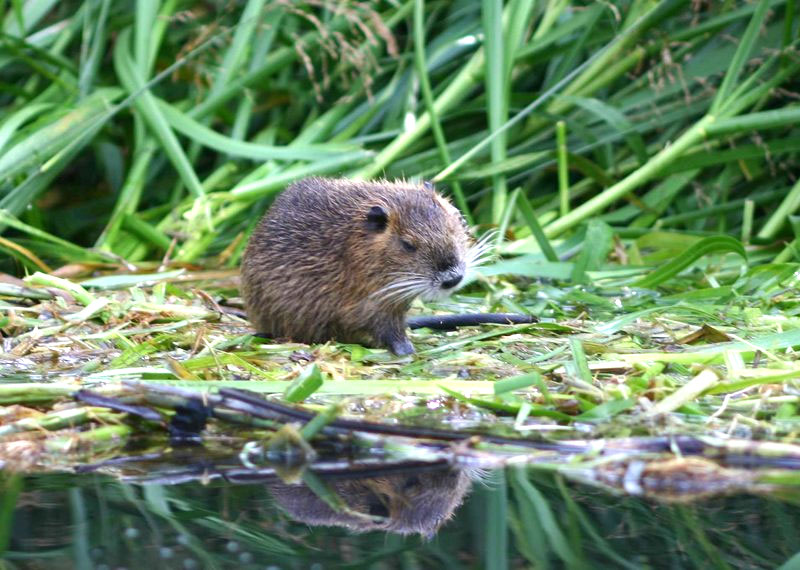
Coypu

Rodents make up the largest order of mammals, with over 40% of mammalian species. They have two incisors in the upper and lower jaw which grow continually and must be kept short by gnawing. Most rodents are small though the capybara can weigh up to 45 kg (100 lb).

- Suborder: Hystricomorpha
  - Family: Erethizontidae (New World porcupines)
    - Subfamily: Erethizontinae
      - Genus: Coendou
        - Bicolor-spined porcupine, Coendou bicolor LR/lc
        - Brazilian porcupine, Coendou prehensilis LR/lc
  - Family: Chinchillidae (viscachas and chinchillas)
    - Genus: Chinchilla
      - Short-tailed chinchilla, Chinchilla brevicaudata CR
    - Genus: Lagidium
      - Southern viscacha, Lagidium viscacia DD
    - Genus: Lagostomus
      - Plains viscacha, Lagostomus maximus LR/lc
  - Family: Dinomyidae (pacarana)
    - Genus: Dinomys
      - Pacarana, Dinomys branickii EN
  - Family: Caviidae (guinea pigs)
    - Subfamily: Caviinae
      - Genus: Cavia
        - Montane guinea pig, Cavia tschudii LR/lc
      - Genus: Galea
        - Common yellow-toothed cavy, Galea musteloides LR/lc
        - Spix's yellow-toothed cavy, Galea spixii LR/lc
      - Genus: Microcavia
        - Southern mountain cavy, Microcavia australis LR/lc
        - Andean mountain cavy, Microcavia niata LR/lc
    - Subfamily: Dolichotinae
      - Genus: Dolichotis
        - Chacoan mara, Dolichotis salinicola LR/nt
      - Subfamily: Hydrochoerinae (capybaras and rock cavies)
        - Genus: Hydrochoerus
          - Capybara, Hydrochoerus hydrochaeris LR/lc
  - Family: Dasyproctidae (agoutis and pacas)
    - Genus: Dasyprocta
      - Central American agouti, Dasyprocta punctata LR/lc
  - Family: Cuniculidae
    - Genus: Cuniculus
      - Lowland paca, Cuniculus paca LC
      - Mountain paca, Cuniculus taczanowskii LR/nt
  - Family: Ctenomyidae
    - Genus: Ctenomys
      - Bolivian tuco-tuco, Ctenomys boliviensis LR/lc
      - Conover's tuco-tuco, Ctenomys conoveri LR/lc
      - Forest tuco-tuco, Ctenomys frater LR/lc
      - White-toothed tuco-tuco, Ctenomys leucodon LR/lc
      - Lewis's tuco-tuco, Ctenomys lewisi LR/lc
      - Highland tuco-tuco, Ctenomys opimus LR/lc
      - Steinbach's tuco-tuco, Ctenomys steinbachi LR/lc
  - Family: Octodontidae
    - Genus: Octodontomys
      - Mountain degu, Octodontomys gliroides LR/lc
  - Family: Abrocomidae
    - Genus: Abrocoma
      - Bolivian chinchilla rat, Abrocoma boliviensis VU
      - Ashy chinchilla rat, Abrocoma cinerea LR/lc
  - Family: Echimyidae
    - Subfamily: Dactylomyinae
      - Genus: Dactylomys
        - Bolivian bamboo rat, Dactylomys boliviensis LR/lc
        - Amazon bamboo rat, Dactylomys dactylinus LC
        - Montane bamboo rat, Dactylomys peruanus DD
    - Subfamily: Eumysopinae
      - Genus: Mesomys
        - Ferreira's spiny tree rat, Mesomys hispidus LR/lc
      - Genus: Proechimys
        - Short-tailed spiny rat, Proechimys brevicauda LR/lc
        - Long-tailed spiny rat, Proechimys longicaudatus LR/lc
        - Simon's spiny rat, Proechimys simonsi LR/lc
        - Steere's spiny rat, Proechimys steerei LR/lc
  - Family: Myocastoridae (coypus)
    - Genus: Myocastor
      - Coypu, Myocastor coypus LR/lc
- Suborder: Sciurognathi
  - Family: Sciuridae (squirrels)
    - Subfamily: Sciurinae
      - Tribe: Sciurini
        - Genus: Sciurus
          - Bolivian squirrel, Sciurus ignitus LR/lc
          - Southern Amazon red squirrel, Sciurus spadiceus LR/lc
  - Family: Cricetidae
    - Subfamily: Sigmodontinae
      - Genus: Akodon
        - Highland grass mouse, Akodon aerosus LR/lc
        - White-bellied grass mouse, Akodon albiventer LR/lc
        - Azara's grass mouse, Akodon azarae LR/lc
        - Bolivian grass mouse, Akodon boliviensis LR/lc
        - Day's grass mouse, Akodon dayi LR/lc
        - Smoky grass mouse, Akodon fumeus LR/lc
        - Thespian grass mouse, Akodon mimus LR/lc
        - Altiplano grass mouse, Akodon puer LR/lc
        - Cochabamba grass mouse, Akodon siberiae VU
        - White-throated grass mouse, Akodon simulator LR/lc
        - Puno grass mouse, Akodon subfuscus LR/lc
        - Chaco grass mouse, Akodon toba LR/lc
        - Variable grass mouse, Akodon varius LR/lc
      - Genus: Andalgalomys
        - Pearson's chaco mouse, Andalgalomys pearsoni LR/lc
      - Genus: Andinomys
        - Andean mouse, Andinomys edax LR/lc
      - Genus: Auliscomys
        - Bolivian big-eared mouse, Auliscomys boliviensis LR/lc
        - Painted big-eared mouse, Auliscomys pictus LR/lc
        - Andean big-eared mouse, Auliscomys sublimis LR/lc
      - Genus: Bolomys
        - Pleasant bolo mouse, Bolomys amoenus LR/lc
        - Rufous-bellied bolo mouse, Bolomys lactens LR/lc
        - Hairy-tailed bolo mouse, Bolomys lasiurus LR/lc
      - Genus: Calomys
        - Bolivian vesper mouse, Calomys boliviae LR/lc
        - Large vesper mouse, Calomys callosus LR/lc
        - Small vesper mouse, Calomys laucha LR/lc
        - Andean vesper mouse, Calomys lepidus LR/lc
      - Genus: Chinchillula
        - Altiplano chinchilla mouse, Chinchillula sahamae LR/lc
      - Genus: Chroeomys
        - Andean altiplano mouse, Chroeomys andinus LR/lc
        - Jelski's altiplano mouse, Chroeomys jelskii LR/lc
      - Genus: Eligmodontia
        - Andean gerbil mouse, Eligmodontia puerulus LR/lc
      - Genus: Galenomys
        - Garlepp's mouse, Galenomys garleppi LR/lc
      - Genus: Graomys
        - Pale leaf-eared mouse, Graomys domorum LR/lc
        - Gray leaf-eared mouse, Graomys griseoflavus LR/lc
      - Genus: Holochilus
        - Wagner's marsh rat, Holochilus sciureus LR/lc
      - Genus: Kunsia
        - Woolly giant rat, Kunsia tomentosus VU
      - Genus: Lenoxus
        - Andean rat, Lenoxus apicalis LR/nt
      - Genus: Microryzomys
        - Forest small rice rat, Microryzomys minutus LR/lc
      - Genus: Neacomys
        - Northern bristly mouse, Neacomys spinosus LR/lc
      - Genus: Neotomys
        - Andean swamp rat, Neotomys ebriosus LR/lc
      - Genus: Oecomys
        - Bicolored arboreal rice rat, Oecomys bicolor LR/lc
        - Unicolored arboreal rice rat, Oecomys concolor LR/lc
        - Mamore arboreal rice rat, Oecomys mamorae LR/lc
        - Robert's arboreal rice rat, Oecomys roberti LR/lc
      - Genus: Oligoryzomys
        - Andean pygmy rice rat, Oligoryzomys andinus LR/lc
        - Chacoan pygmy rice rat, Oligoryzomys chacoensis LR/lc
        - Destructive rice rat, Oligoryzomys destructor DD
        - Small-eared pygmy rice rat, Oligoryzomys microtis LR/lc
      - Genus: Oryzomys
        - Tarija rice rat, Oryzomys legatus LR/lc
        - Light-footed rice rat, Oryzomys levipes LR/nt
        - Azara's broad-headed rice rat, Oryzomys megacephalus LR/lc
        - Elegant rice rat, Oryzomys nitidus LR/lc
        - Terraced rice rat, Oryzomys subflavus LR/lc
        - Yungas rice rat, Oryzomys yunganus LR/lc
      - Genus: Oxymycterus
        - Quechuan hocicudo, Oxymycterus hucucha VU
        - Incan hocicudo, Oxymycterus inca LR/lc
        - Paramo hocicudo, Oxymycterus paramensis LR/lc
      - Genus: Phyllotis
        - Capricorn leaf-eared mouse, Phyllotis caprinus LR/lc
        - Darwin's leaf-eared mouse, Phyllotis darwini LR/lc
        - Bunchgrass leaf-eared mouse, Phyllotis osilae LR/lc
        - Wolffsohn's leaf-eared mouse, Phyllotis wolffsohni LR/lc
      - Genus: Pseudoryzomys
        - Brazilian false rice rat, Pseudoryzomys simplex LR/lc
      - Genus: Rhipidomys
        - Southern climbing mouse, Rhipidomys austrinus LR/lc
      - Genus: Thomasomys
        - Daphne's Oldfield mouse, Thomasomys daphne LR/lc
        - Ladew's Oldfield mouse, Thomasomys ladewi LR/lc
        - Montane Oldfield mouse, Thomasomys oreas LR/lc

==== Order: Lagomorpha (lagomorphs) ====
The lagomorphs comprise two families, Leporidae (hares and rabbits), and Ochotonidae (pikas). Though they can resemble rodents, and were classified as a superfamily in that order until the early 20th century, they have since been considered a separate order. They differ from rodents in a number of physical characteristics, such as having four incisors in the upper jaw rather than two.

- Family: Leporidae (rabbits, hares)
  - Genus: Sylvilagus
    - Common tapetí, Sylvilagus brasiliensis EN

==== Order: Chiroptera (bats) ====
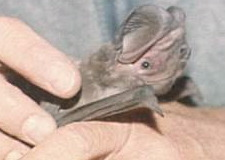
Western mastiff bat

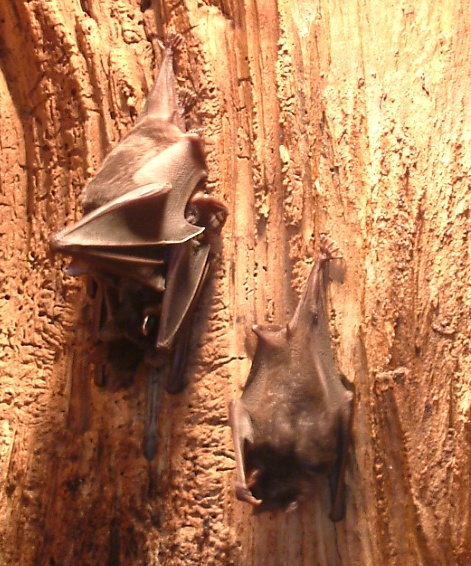
Pale spear-nosed bat

The bats' most distinguishing feature is that their forelimbs are developed as wings, making them the only mammals capable of flight. Bat species account for about 20% of all mammals.

- Family: Noctilionidae
  - Genus: Noctilio
    - Lesser bulldog bat, Noctilio albiventris LR/lc
    - Greater bulldog bat, Noctilio leporinus LR/lc
- Family: Vespertilionidae
  - Subfamily: Myotinae
    - Genus: Myotis
      - Silver-tipped myotis, Myotis albescens LR/lc
      - Hairy-legged myotis, Myotis keaysi LR/lc
      - Yellowish myotis, Myotis levis LR/lc
      - Black myotis, Myotis nigricans LR/lc
      - Montane myotis, Myotis oxyotus LR/lc
      - Riparian myotis, Myotis riparius LR/lc
      - Velvety myotis, Myotis simus LR/lc
  - Subfamily: Vespertilioninae
    - Genus: Eptesicus
      - Little black serotine, Eptesicus andinus LR/lc
      - Brazilian brown bat, Eptesicus brasiliensis LR/lc
      - Argentine brown bat, Eptesicus furinalis LR/lc
    - Genus: Histiotus
      - Big-eared brown bat, Histiotus macrotus LR/nt
      - Small big-eared brown bat, Histiotus montanus LR/lc
    - Genus: Lasiurus
      - Desert red bat, Lasiurus blossevillii LR/lc
      - Hoary bat, Lasiurus cinereus LR/lc
- Family: Molossidae
  - Genus: Cynomops
    - Cinnamon dog-faced bat, Cynomops abrasus LR/nt
    - Southern dog-faced bat, Cynomops planirostris LR/lc
  - Genus: Eumops
    - Dwarf bonneted bat, Eumops bonariensis LR/lc
    - Wagner's bonneted bat, Eumops glaucinus LR/lc
    - Sanborn's bonneted bat, Eumops hansae LR/lc
    - Western mastiff bat, Eumops perotis LR/lc
  - Genus: Molossops
    - Dwarf dog-faced bat, Molossops temminckii LR/lc
  - Genus: Molossus
    - Black mastiff bat, Molossus ater LR/lc
    - Velvety free-tailed bat, Molossus molossus LR/lc
  - Genus: Nyctinomops
    - Peale's free-tailed bat, Nyctinomops aurispinosus LR/lc
    - Broad-eared bat, Nyctinomops laticaudatus LR/lc
    - Big free-tailed bat, Nyctinomops macrotis LR/lc
  - Genus: Promops
    - Big crested mastiff bat, Promops centralis LR/lc
    - Brown mastiff bat, Promops nasutus LR/lc
  - Genus: Tadarida
    - Mexican free-tailed bat, Tadarida brasiliensis LR/nt
- Family: Emballonuridae
  - Genus: Peropteryx
    - Greater dog-like bat, Peropteryx kappleri LR/lc
    - Lesser dog-like bat, Peropteryx macrotis LR/lc
  - Genus: Rhynchonycteris
    - Proboscis bat, Rhynchonycteris naso LR/lc
  - Genus: Saccopteryx
    - Greater sac-winged bat, Saccopteryx bilineata LR/lc
    - Lesser sac-winged bat, Saccopteryx leptura LR/lc
- Family: Mormoopidae
  - Genus: Pteronotus
    - Big naked-backed bat, Pteronotus gymnonotus LR/lc
    - Parnell's mustached bat, Pteronotus parnellii LR/lc
    - Wagner's mustached bat, Pteronotus personatus LR/lc
- Family: Phyllostomidae
  - Subfamily: Phyllostominae
    - Genus: Chrotopterus
      - Big-eared woolly bat, Chrotopterus auritus LR/lc
    - Genus: Lonchorhina
      - Tomes's sword-nosed bat, Lonchorhina aurita LR/lc
    - Genus: Lophostoma
      - Pygmy round-eared bat, Lophostoma brasiliense LR/lc
      - Carriker's round-eared bat, Lophostoma carrikeri VU
      - White-throated round-eared bat, Lophostoma silvicolum LR/lc
    - Genus: Macrophyllum
      - Long-legged bat, Macrophyllum macrophyllum LR/lc
    - Genus: Micronycteris
      - Little big-eared bat, Micronycteris megalotis LR/lc
      - White-bellied big-eared bat, Micronycteris minuta LR/lc
    - Genus: Mimon
      - Striped hairy-nosed bat, Mimon crenulatum LR/lc
    - Genus: Phylloderma
      - Pale-faced bat, Phylloderma stenops LR/lc
    - Genus: Phyllostomus
      - Pale spear-nosed bat, Phyllostomus discolor LR/lc
      - Lesser spear-nosed bat, Phyllostomus elongatus LR/lc
      - Greater spear-nosed bat, Phyllostomus hastatus LR/lc
    - Genus: Tonatia
      - Greater round-eared bat, Tonatia bidens LR/lc
      - Stripe-headed round-eared bat, Tonatia saurophila LR/lc
    - Genus: Trachops
      - Fringe-lipped bat, Trachops cirrhosus LR/lc
  - Subfamily: Lonchophyllinae
    - Genus: Lonchophylla
      - Thomas's nectar bat, Lonchophylla thomasi LR/lc
  - Subfamily: Glossophaginae
    - Genus: Anoura
      - Tailed tailless bat, Anoura caudifer LR/lc
      - Handley's tailless bat, Anoura cultrata LR/lc
      - Geoffroy's tailless bat, Anoura geoffroyi LR/lc
    - Genus: Choeroniscus
      - Minor long-nosed long-tongued bat, Choeroniscus minor LR/lc
    - Genus: Glossophaga
      - Pallas's long-tongued bat, Glossophaga soricina LR/lc
    - Genus: Lichonycteris
      - Dark long-tongued bat, Lichonycteris obscura LR/lc
  - Subfamily: Carolliinae
    - Genus: Carollia
      - Silky short-tailed bat, Carollia brevicauda LR/lc
      - Chestnut short-tailed bat, Carollia castanea LR/lc
      - Seba's short-tailed bat, Carollia perspicillata LR/lc
    - Genus: Rhinophylla
      - Dwarf little fruit bat, Rhinophylla pumilio LR/lc
  - Subfamily: Stenodermatinae
    - Genus: Artibeus
      - Andersen's fruit-eating bat, Artibeus anderseni LR/lc
      - Silver fruit-eating bat, Artibeus glaucus LR/lc
      - Jamaican fruit bat, Artibeus jamaicensis LR/lc
      - Great fruit-eating bat, Artibeus lituratus LR/lc
      - Dark fruit-eating bat, Artibeus obscurus LR/nt
    - Genus: Chiroderma
      - Salvin's big-eyed bat, Chiroderma salvini LR/lc
      - Little big-eyed bat, Chiroderma trinitatum LR/lc
      - Hairy big-eyed bat, Chiroderma villosum LR/lc
    - Genus: Enchisthenes
      - Velvety fruit-eating bat, Enchisthenes hartii LR/lc
    - Genus: Mesophylla
      - MacConnell's bat, Mesophylla macconnelli LR/lc
    - Genus: Pygoderma
      - Ipanema bat, Pygoderma bilabiatum LR/nt
    - Genus: Sphaeronycteris
      - Visored bat, Sphaeronycteris toxophyllum LR/lc
    - Genus: Sturnira
      - Bogota yellow-shouldered bat, Sturnira bogotensis LR/lc
      - Hairy yellow-shouldered bat, Sturnira erythromos LR/lc
      - Little yellow-shouldered bat, Sturnira lilium LR/lc
      - Greater yellow-shouldered bat, Sturnira magna LR/nt
      - Tilda's yellow-shouldered bat, Sturnira tildae LR/lc
    - Genus: Uroderma
      - Tent-making bat, Uroderma bilobatum LR/lc
      - Brown tent-making bat, Uroderma magnirostrum LR/lc
    - Genus: Vampyressa
      - Bidentate yellow-eared bat, Vampyressa bidens LR/nt
      - Southern little yellow-eared bat, Vampyressa pusilla LR/lc
    - Genus: Vampyrodes
      - Great stripe-faced bat, Vampyrodes caraccioli LR/lc
    - Genus: Platyrrhinus
      - Short-headed broad-nosed bat, Platyrrhinus brachycephalus LR/lc
      - Thomas's broad-nosed bat, Platyrrhinus dorsalis LR/lc
      - Heller's broad-nosed bat, Platyrrhinus helleri LR/lc
      - Buffy broad-nosed bat, Platyrrhinus infuscus LR/nt
      - White-lined broad-nosed bat, Platyrrhinus lineatus LR/lc
      - Greater broad-nosed bat, Platyrrhinus vittatus LR/lc
  - Subfamily: Desmodontinae
    - Genus: Desmodus
      - Common vampire bat, Desmodus rotundus LR/lc
    - Genus: Diaemus
      - White-winged vampire bat, Diaemus youngi LR/lc
    - Genus: Diphylla
      - Hairy-legged vampire bat, Diphylla ecaudata LR/nt
- Family: Thyropteridae
  - Genus: Thyroptera
    - Peters's disk-winged bat, Thyroptera discifera LR/lc
    - Spix's disk-winged bat, Thyroptera tricolor LR/lc

==== Order: Cetacea (whales) ====
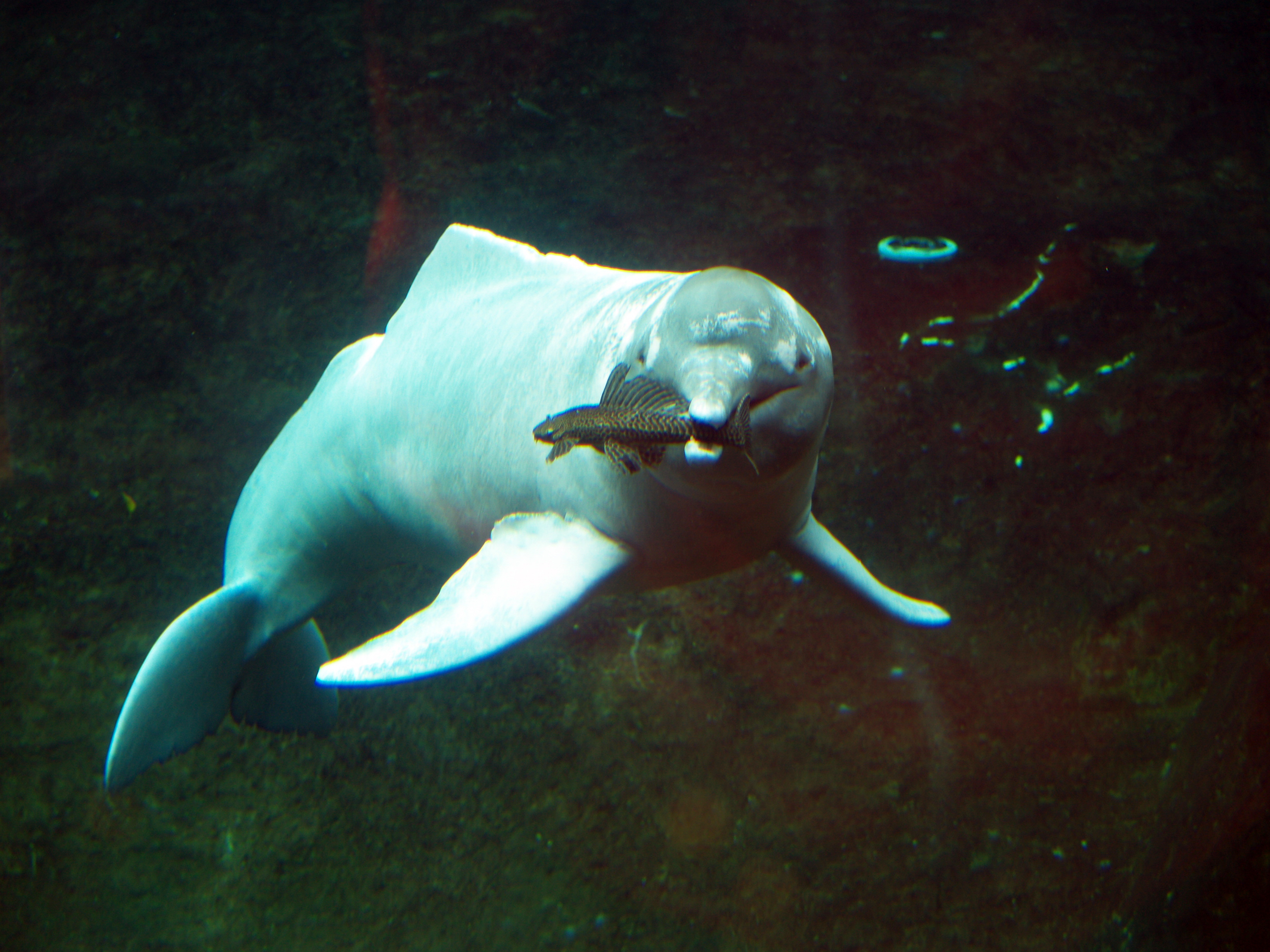
Boto

The order Cetacea includes whales, dolphins and porpoises. They are the mammals most fully adapted to aquatic life with a spindle-shaped nearly hairless body, protected by a thick layer of blubber, and forelimbs and tail modified to provide propulsion underwater.

- Suborder: Odontoceti
  - Superfamily: Platanistoidea
    - Family: Iniidae
      - Genus: Inia
        - Boto, Inia geoffrensis VU
    - Family: Delphinidae (marine dolphins)
      - Genus: Sotalia
        - Tucuxi, Sotalia fluviatilis DD

==== Order: Carnivora (carnivorans) ====
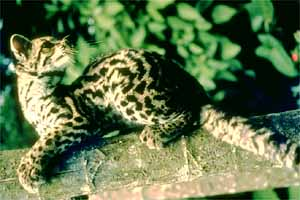
Margay

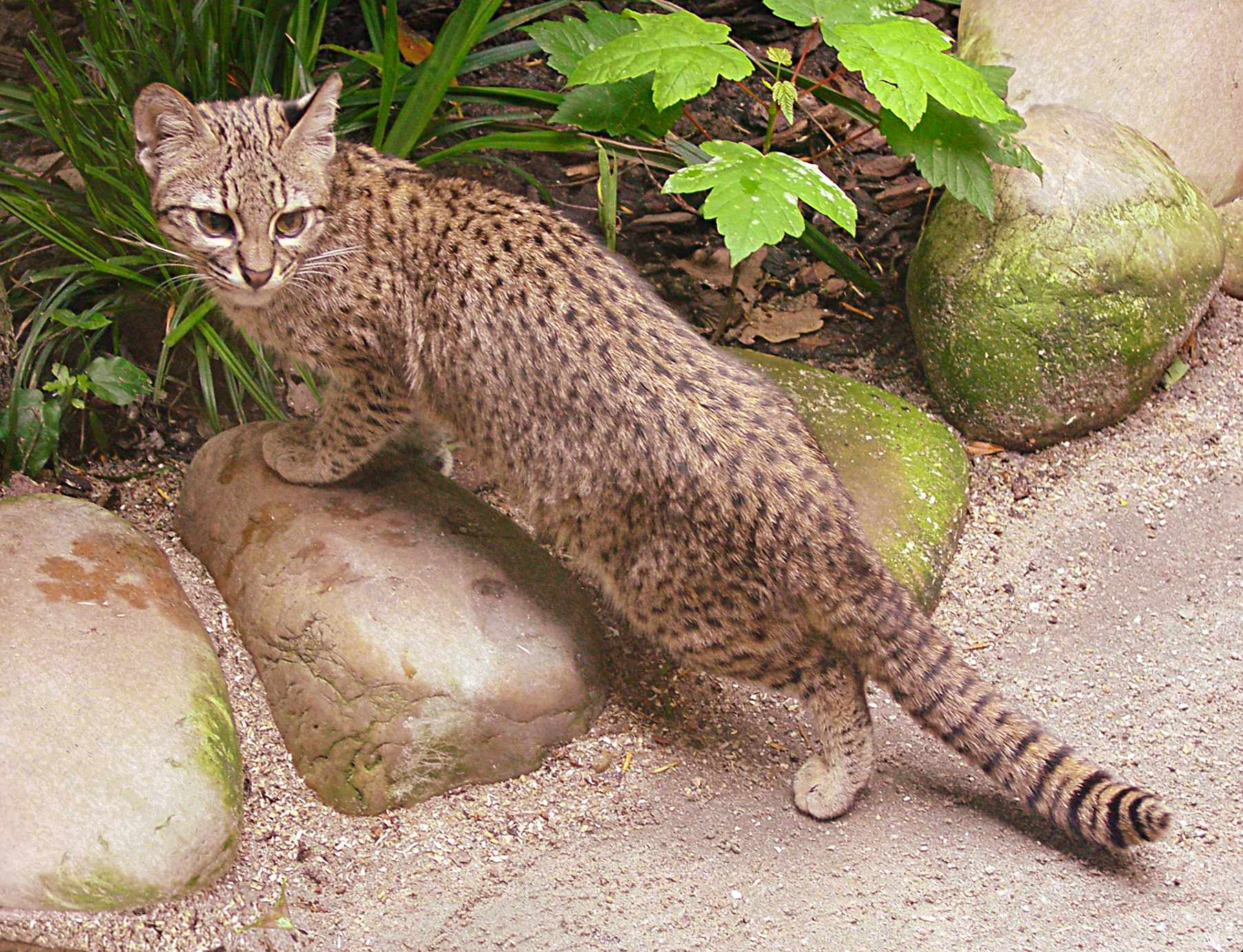
Geoffroy's cat

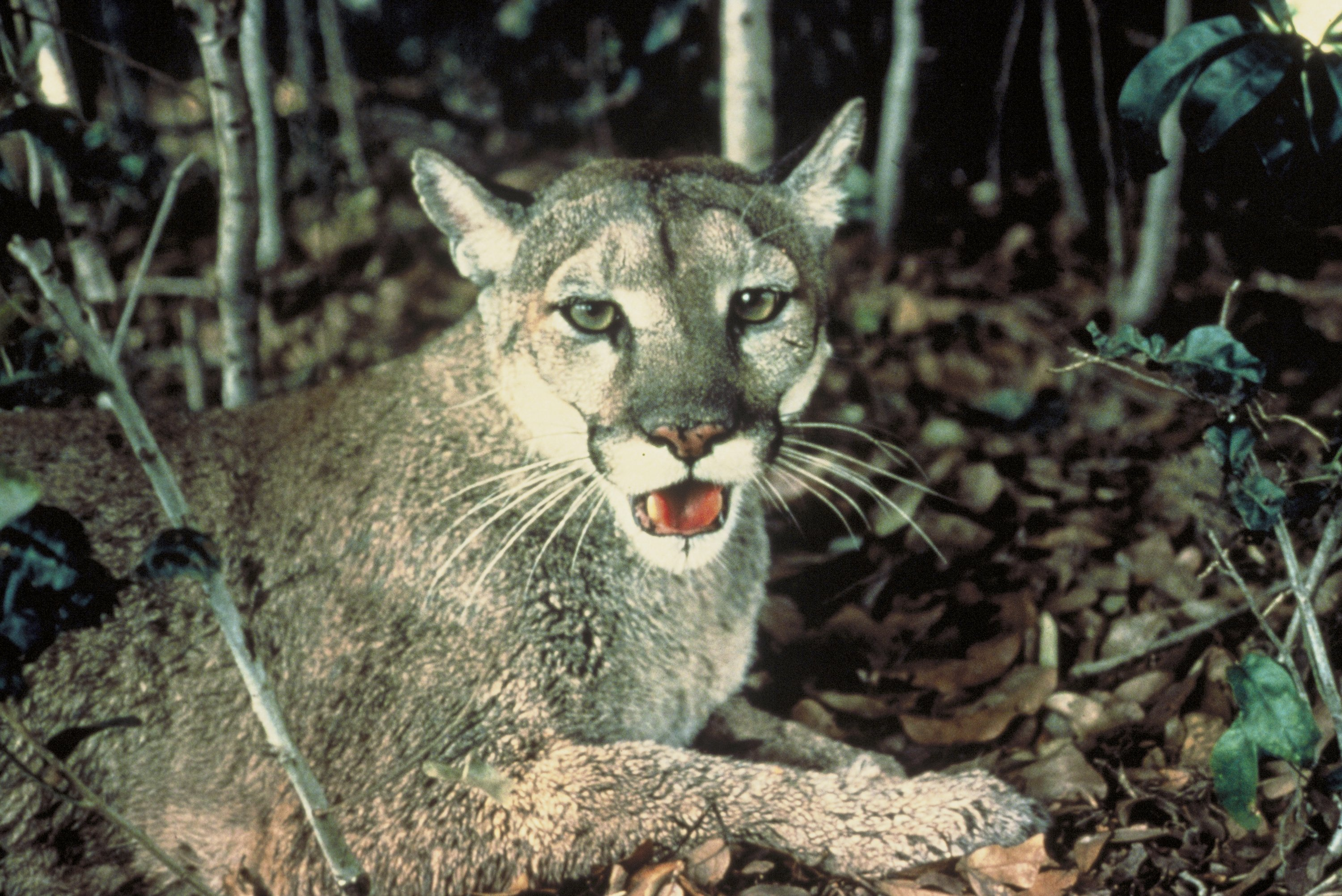
Cougar

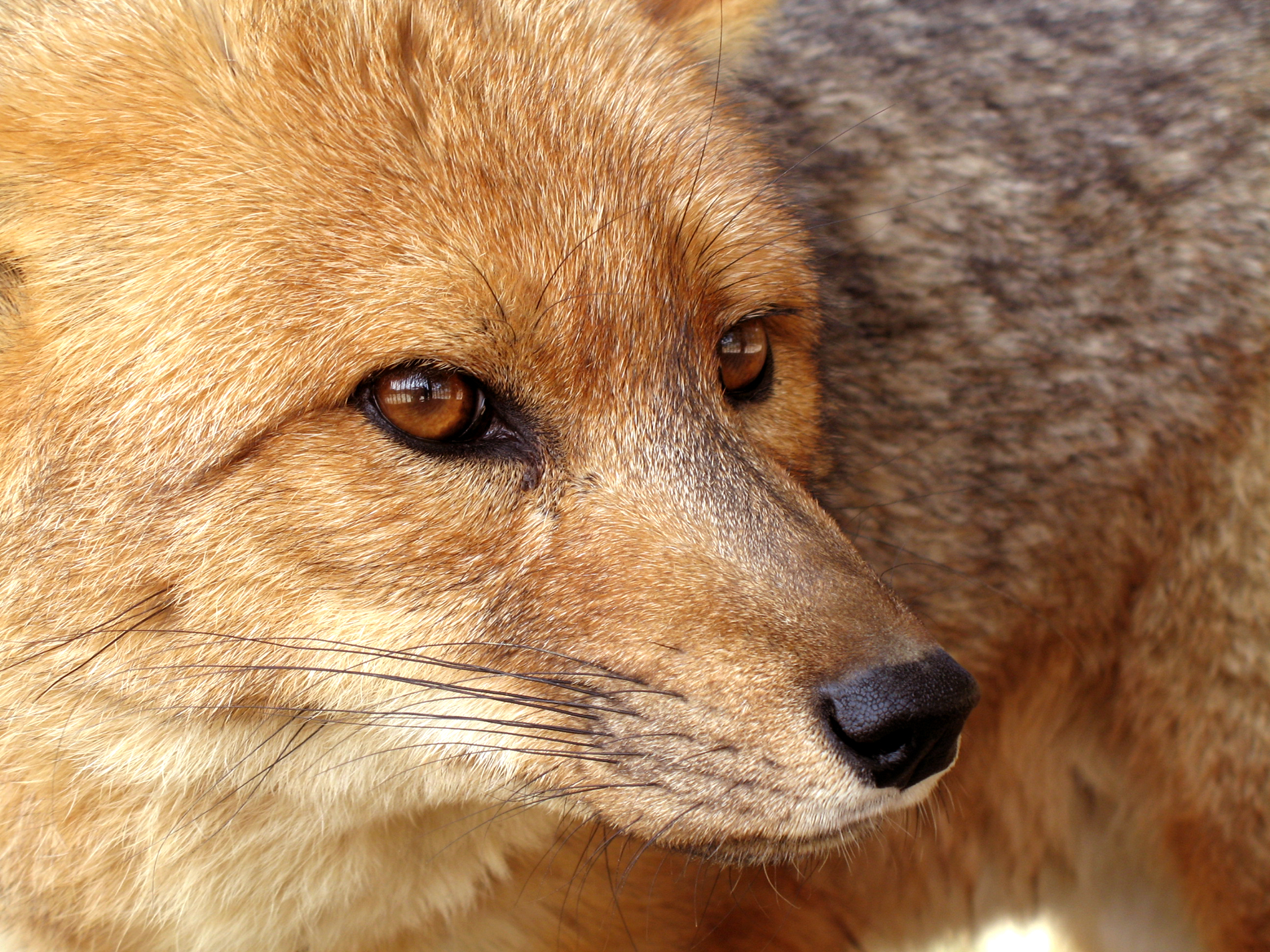
Culpeo

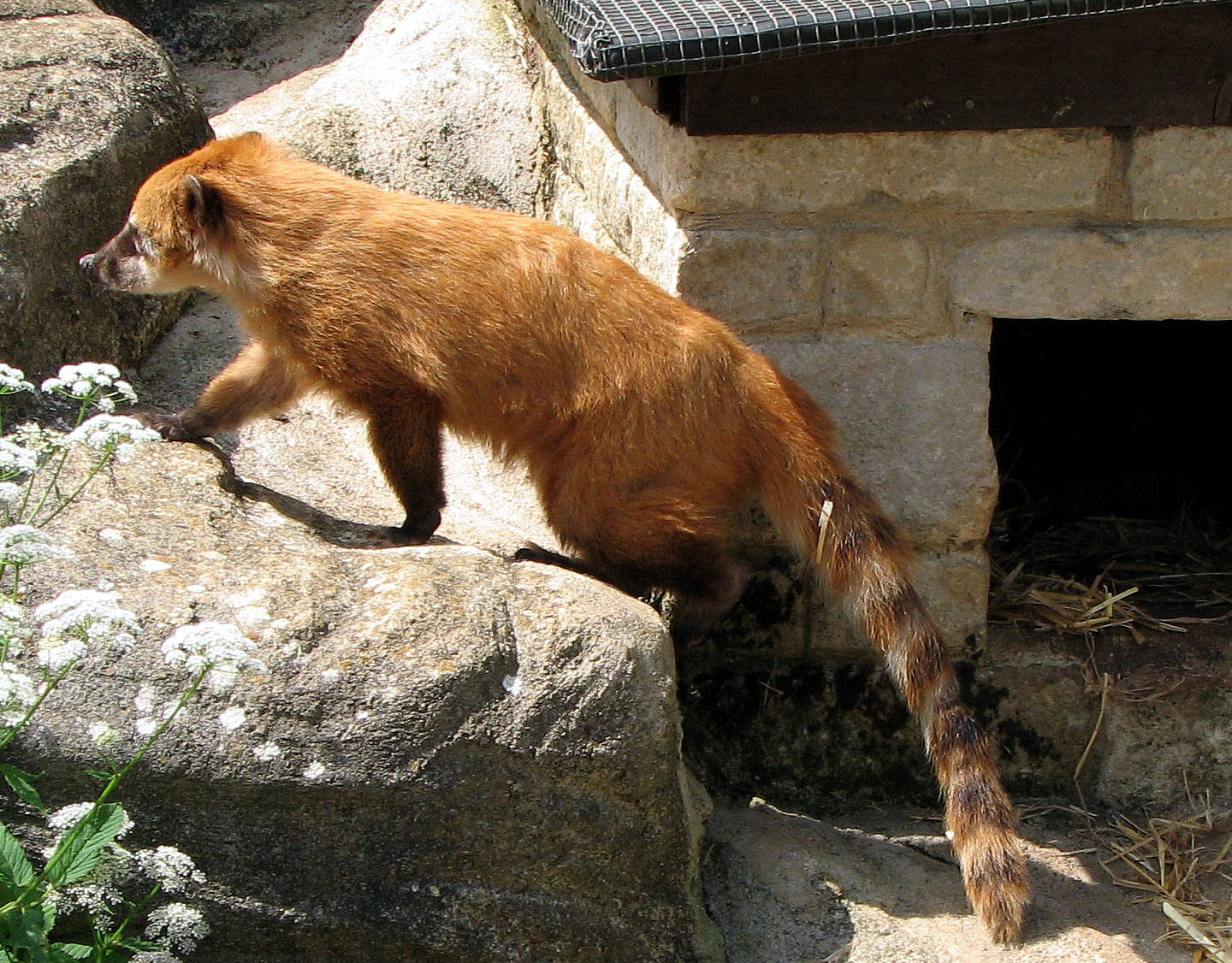
South American coati

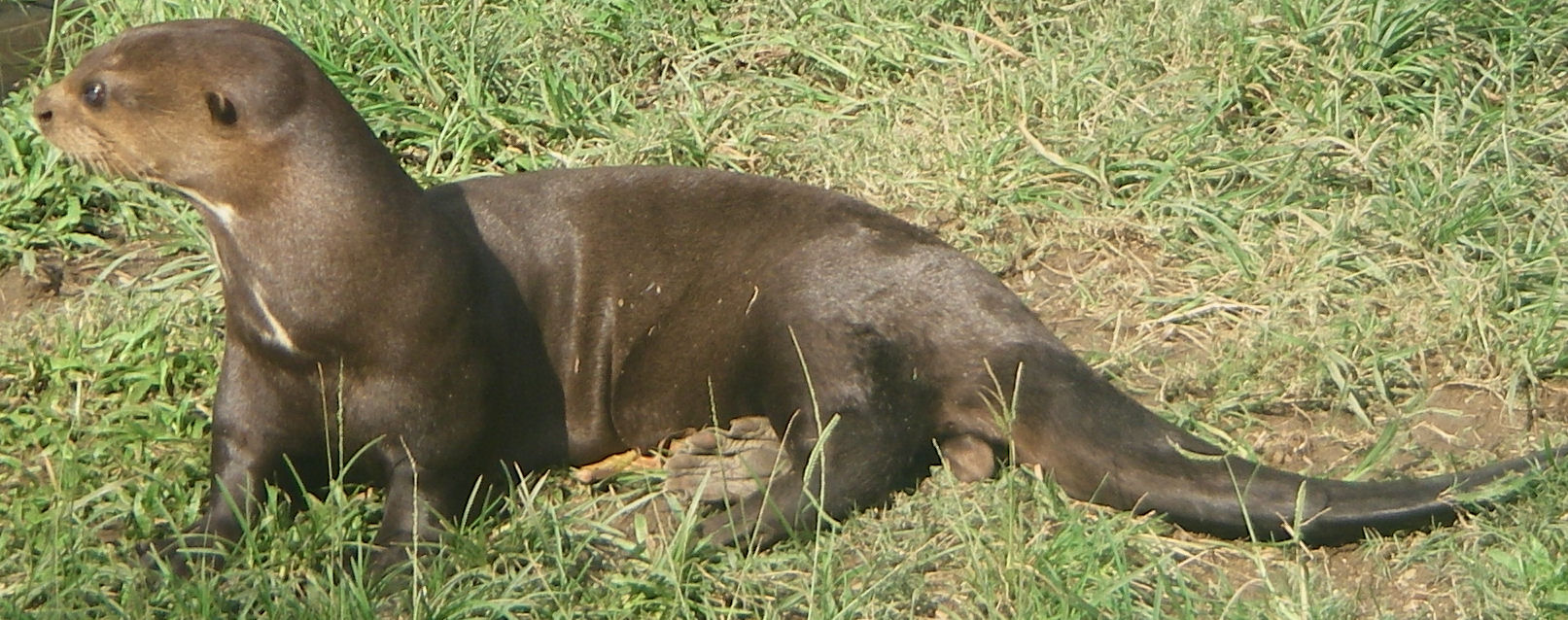
Giant otter

There are over 260 species of carnivorans, the majority of which feed primarily on meat. They have a characteristic skull shape and dentition.

- Suborder: Feliformia
  - Family: Felidae (cats)
    - Subfamily: Felinae
      - Genus: Leopardus
        - Pampas cat L. colocola NT
        - Geoffroy's cat L. geoffroyi LC
        - Andean mountain cat L. jacobitusEN
        - Ocelot L. pardalis LC
        - Oncilla L. tigrinus VU
        - Tilcayo L. tilcayo
        - Margay L. wiedii NT
      - Genus: Herpailurus
        - Jaguarundi, H. yagouaroundi LC
      - Genus: Puma
        - Cougar, P. concolor LC
    - Subfamily: Pantherinae
      - Genus: Panthera
        - Jaguar, P. onca NT
- Suborder: Caniformia
  - Family: Canidae (dogs, foxes)
    - Genus: Lycalopex
      - Culpeo, Lycalopex culpaeus LC
      - Pampas fox, Lycalopex gymnocercus LC
    - Genus: Cerdocyon
      - Crab-eating fox, Cerdocyon thous LC
    - Genus: Atelocynus
      - Short-eared dog, Atelocynus microtis DD
    - Genus: Speothos
      - Bush dog, Speothos venaticus VU
    - Genus: Chrysocyon
      - Maned wolf, Chrysocyon brachyurus NT
  - Family: Ursidae (bears)
    - Genus: Tremarctos
      - Spectacled bear, Tremarctos ornatus VU
  - Family: Procyonidae (raccoons)
    - Genus: Procyon
      - Crab-eating raccoon, Procyon cancrivorus LR/lc
    - Genus: Nasua
      - South American coati, Nasua nasua LR/lc
    - Genus: Potos
      - Kinkajou, Potos flavus LR/lc
    - Genus: Bassaricyon
      - Eastern lowland olingo, Bassaricyon alleni LR/lc
  - Family: Mustelidae (mustelids)
    - Genus: Eira
      - Tayra, Eira barbara LR/lc
    - Genus: Galictis
      - Lesser grison, Galictis cuja LR/lc
      - Greater grison, Galictis vittata LR/lc
    - Genus: Lontra
      - Neotropical river otter, Lontra longicaudis DD
    - Genus: Neogale
      - Long-tailed weasel, Neogale frenata LR/lc
    - Genus: Pteronura
      - Giant otter, Pteronura brasiliensis EN
  - Family: Mephitidae
    - Genus: Conepatus
      - Molina's hog-nosed skunk, Conepatus chinga LR/lc

==== Order: Perissodactyla (odd-toed ungulates) ====
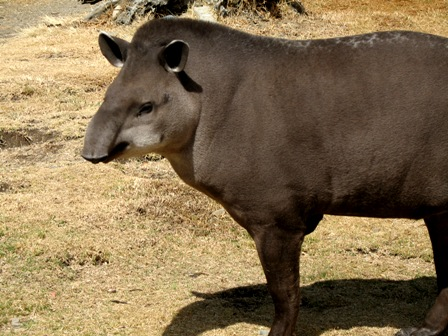
Brazilian tapir

The odd-toed ungulates are browsing and grazing mammals. They are usually large to very large, and have relatively simple stomachs and a large middle toe.

- Family: Tapiridae (tapirs)
  - Genus: Tapirus
    - Brazilian tapir, Tapirus terrestris VU

==== Order: Artiodactyla (even-toed ungulates) ====
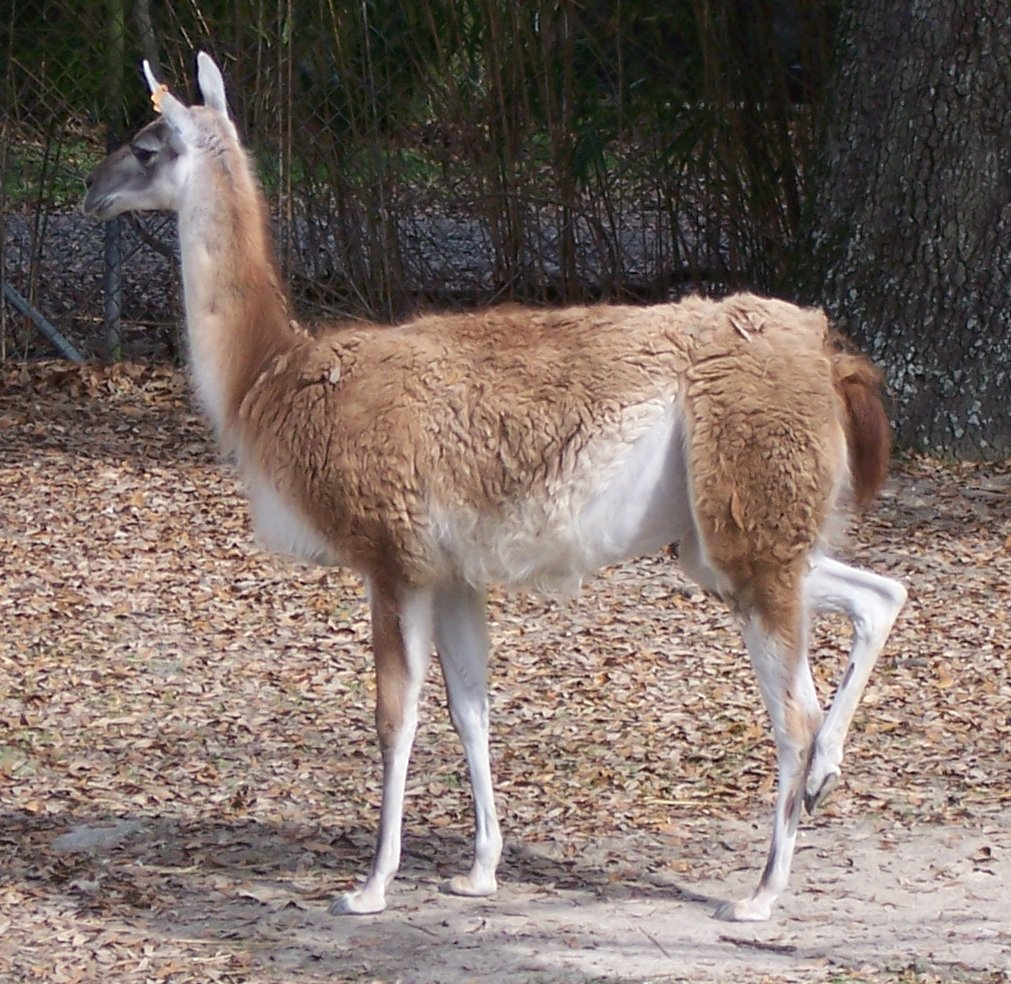
Guanaco

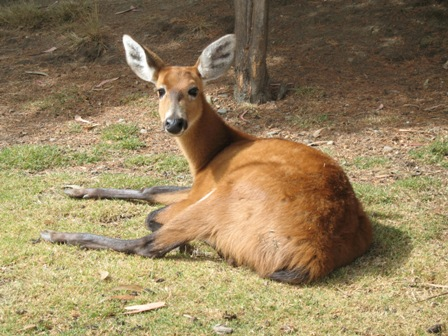
Marsh deer

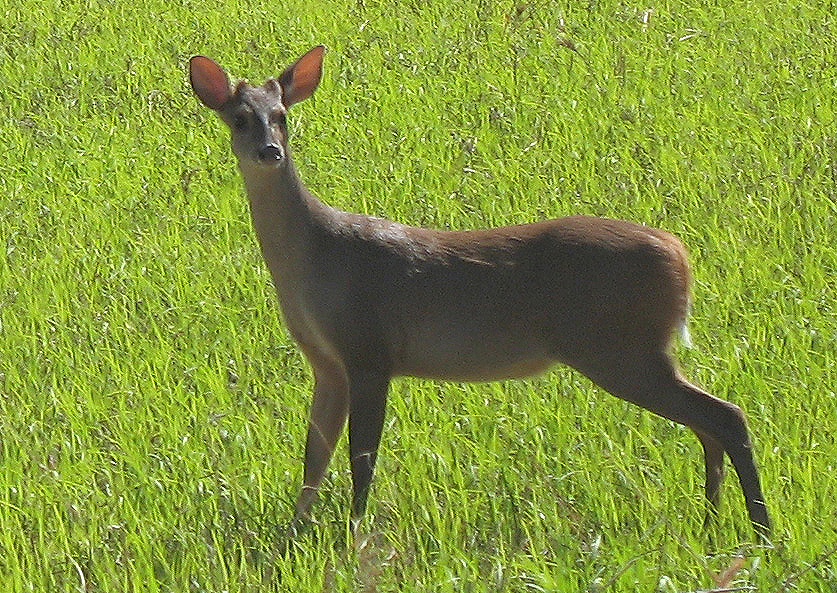
Red brocket

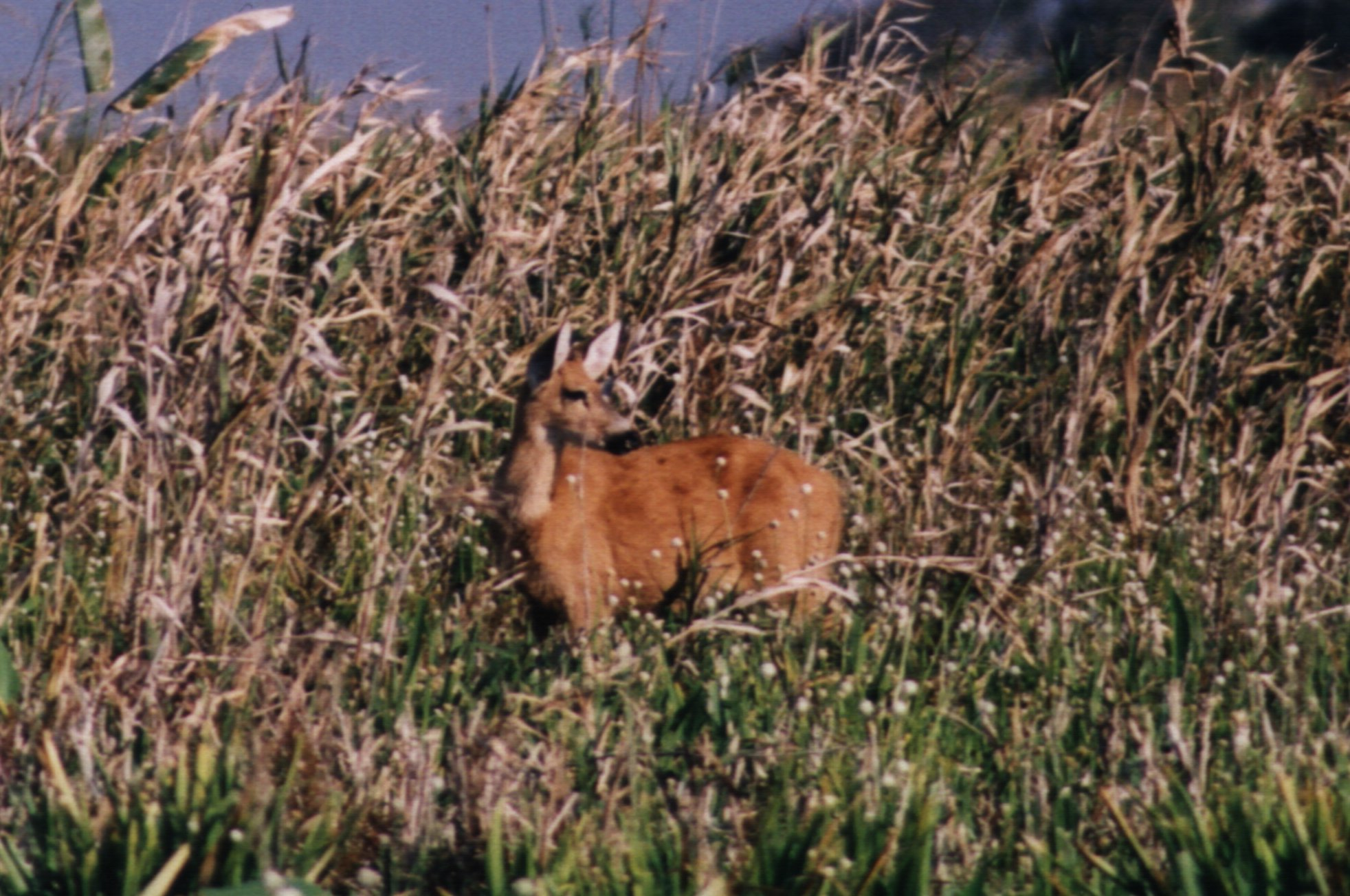
Pampas deer

The even-toed ungulates are ungulates whose weight is borne about equally by the third and fourth toes, rather than mostly or entirely by the third as in perissodactyls. There are about 220 artiodactyl species, including many that are of great economic importance to humans.

- Family: Tayassuidae (peccaries)
  - Genus: Catagonus
    - Chacoan peccary, C. wagneri EN
  - Genus: Pecari
    - Collared peccary, Dicotyles tajacu LC
  - Genus: Tayassu
    - White-lipped peccary, Tayassu pecari NT
- Family: Camelidae (camels, llamas)
  - Genus: Lama
    - Guanaco, Lama guanicoe LR/lc
    - Vicuña, Lama vicugna LR/cd
- Family: Cervidae (deer)
  - Subfamily: Capreolinae
    - Genus: Blastocerus
      - Marsh deer, Blastocerus dichotomus VU
    - Genus: Hippocamelus
      - Taruca, Hippocamelus antisensis DD
    - Genus: Mazama
      - Red brocket, Mazama americana DD
      - Dwarf brocket, Mazama chunyi DD
      - Gray brocket, Mazama gouazoupira DD
    - Genus: Ozotoceros
      - Pampas deer, Ozotoceros bezoarticus N

=== Infraclass: Metatheria ===
==== Order: Didelphimorphia (common opossums) ====
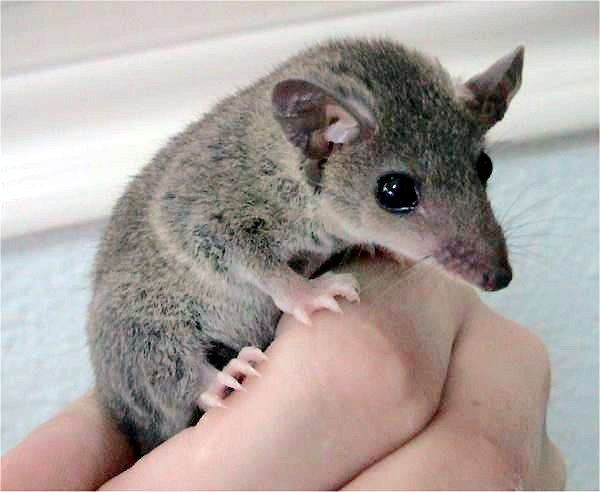
Gray short-tailed opossum

Didelphimorphia is the order of common opossums of the Western Hemisphere. Opossums probably diverged from the basic South American marsupials in the late Cretaceous or early Paleocene. They are small to medium-sized marsupials, about the size of a large house cat, with a long snout and prehensile tail.

- Family: Didelphidae (American opossums)
  - Subfamily: Caluromyinae
    - Genus: Caluromys
      - Brown-eared woolly opossum, Caluromys lanatus LR/nt
    - Genus: Glironia
      - Bushy-tailed opossum, Glironia venusta VU
  - Subfamily: Didelphinae
    - Genus: Chironectes
      - Water opossum, Chironectes minimus LR/nt
    - Genus: Didelphis
      - White-eared opossum, Didelphis albiventris LR/lc
      - Common opossum, Didelphis marsupialis LR/lc
    - Genus: Gracilinanus
      - Aceramarca gracile opossum, Gracilinanus aceramarcae LC
      - Agile gracile opossum, Gracilinanus agilis LR/nt
    - Genus: Lutreolina
      - Big lutrine opossum, Lutreolina crassicaudata LR/lc
      - Massoia's lutrine opossum, Lutreolina massoia LC
    - Genus: Marmosa
      - Rufous mouse opossum, Marmosa lepida LR/nt
      - Linnaeus's mouse opossum, Marmosa murina LR/lc
      - Bare-tailed woolly mouse opossum, Marmosa regina LR/lc
    - Genus: Marmosops
      - Dorothy's slender opossum, Marmosops dorothea VU
      - White-bellied slender opossum, Marmosops noctivagus LR/lc
    - Genus: Metachirus
      - Brown four-eyed opossum, Metachirus nudicaudatus LR/lc
    - Genus: Monodelphis
      - Northern red-sided opossum, Monodelphis brevicaudata LR/lc
      - Gray short-tailed opossum, Monodelphis domestica LR/lc
      - Pygmy short-tailed opossum, Monodelphis kunsi EN
      - Osgood's short-tailed opossum, Monodelphis osgoodi VU
    - Genus: Philander
      - Gray four-eyed opossum, Philander opossum LR/lc
    - Genus: Thylamys
      - Elegant fat-tailed mouse opossum, Thylamys elegans LR/lc
      - White-bellied fat-tailed mouse opossum, Thylamys pallidior LR/lc
      - Common fat-tailed mouse opossum, Thylamys pusillus LR/lc

== See also ==
- List of chordate orders
- Lists of mammals by region
- List of prehistoric mammals
- Mammal classification
- List of mammals described in the 2000s
