= Caparaó grass mouse =

Conservation status
- Data Deficient (IUCN 3.1)

Scientific classification
- Kingdom: Animalia
- Phylum: Chordata
- Class: Mammalia
- Order: Rodentia
- Family: Cricetidae
- Subfamily: Sigmodontinae
- Genus: Akodon
- Species: A. mystax

Binomial name
- Akodon mystax Hershkovitz, 1998

Species of rodent

The Caparaó grass mouse (Akodon mystax) is a rodent species from South America. It is found in Brazil.
