= Neuquén grass mouse =

Conservation status
- Data Deficient (IUCN 3.1)

Scientific classification
- Kingdom: Animalia
- Phylum: Chordata
- Class: Mammalia
- Infraclass: Placentalia
- Order: Rodentia
- Family: Cricetidae
- Subfamily: Sigmodontinae
- Genus: Akodon
- Species: A. neocenus

Binomial name
- Akodon neocenus Thomas, 1919

Synonyms
- Akodon varius neocenus

Species of rodent

The Neuquén grass mouse (Akodon neocenus) is a species of rodent in the family Cricetidae. It is found only in Argentina. As of 2017, the IUCN synonymizes it with Akodon dolores.
