= Oligoryzomys destructor =

Conservation status
- Least Concern (IUCN 3.1)

Scientific classification
- Kingdom: Animalia
- Phylum: Chordata
- Class: Mammalia
- Order: Rodentia
- Family: Cricetidae
- Subfamily: Sigmodontinae
- Genus: Oligoryzomys
- Species: O. destructor

Binomial name
- Oligoryzomys destructor (Tschudi, 1844)

Synonyms
- Hesperomys destructor Tschudi, 1844; Oryzomys stolzmanni maranonicus Osgood, 1914; Hesperomys melanostoma Tschudi, 1844; Oryzomys (Oligoryzomys) spodiurus Hershkovitz, 1940; Oryzomys stolzmanni Thomas, 1894

Species of rodent

Oligoryzomys destructor, also known as Tschudi's colilargo or the destructive pygmy rice rat, is a species of rodent in the genus Oligoryzomys of family Cricetidae. It is found along the eastern Andes from southern Colombia, through Ecuador, Peru, and Bolivia into northern Argentina. Its karyotype has 2n = 60 and FNa = 76.

== Description ==
Oligoryzomys destructor is a small species of rice rat. The head is reddish-brown with many blackish hairs, and just behind the ears there are pale patches. The ears have short, pale brown hairs on the inside and longer, blackish hairs on the outside. The whiskers are black with white tips and the hairs at the end of the snout are white. The fur on the dorsal surface of the body is reddish-brown, interspersed with black hairs, and a few grey hairs with pale tips. The flanks are reddish-brown, the throat and chest are pale grey and the belly is yellowish-white. The tail is brown and slightly shorter than the combined head-and-body length. The upper surface of the hind feet bear short silvery hairs, with the hairs growing beside the nails being exceptionally long. The underside of the feet are pale brown.

== Distribution and habitat ==
O. destructor occurs on the eastern slopes of the Andes in South America, its altitudinal range being 600 to 3,350 m (2,000 to 11,000 ft). Its range extends from southern Colombia and Ecuador to Peru, Bolivia and northwestern Argentina. Its habitat is tropical and subtropical forest and montane forest, and in Bolivia it has mostly been found in the Yungas, a transitional forest zone.

== Status ==
O. destructor has a wide range, and though its population size has not been estimated, in many places it is common and it is likely to have a large total population. No particular threats have been identified and the International Union for Conservation of Nature has rated its conservation status as being of "least concern".

== Literature cited ==
- Musser, G. G.; Carleton, M. D. (2005). "Superfamily Muroidea". In Wilson, D. E.; Reeder, D. M. (eds.). Mammal Species of the World: A Taxonomic and Geographic Reference (3rd ed.). Johns Hopkins University Press. pp. 894–1531. ISBN 978-0-8018-8221-0. OCLC 62265494.
