= Serra do Mar grass mouse =

Conservation status
- Least Concern (IUCN 3.1)

Scientific classification
- Kingdom: Animalia
- Phylum: Chordata
- Class: Mammalia
- Order: Rodentia
- Family: Cricetidae
- Subfamily: Sigmodontinae
- Genus: Akodon
- Species: A. serrensis

Binomial name
- Akodon serrensis Thomas, 1902

Species of rodent

The Serra do Mar grass mouse or Cerrado grass mouse (Akodon serrensis) is a rodent species from South America. It is found in Brazil.

Pardiñas et al. (2016) transferred this species from the genus Akodon to the separate akodontine genus Castoria. The authors also considered A. serrensis to be likely junior synonym of the species Habrothrix angustidens Winge (1887), described on the basis of fossil (probably late Pleistocene) remains recovered from five cave deposits in the area of Lagoa Santa (Minas Gerais, Brazil), which is the type species of the genus Castoria.
