= Philip Myers's akodont =

Conservation status
- Data Deficient (IUCN 3.1)

Scientific classification
- Kingdom: Animalia
- Phylum: Chordata
- Class: Mammalia
- Order: Rodentia
- Family: Cricetidae
- Subfamily: Sigmodontinae
- Genus: Akodon
- Species: A. philipmyersi

Binomial name
- Akodon philipmyersi Pardiñas, D'Elia, Cirignoli, Suarez, 2005

Species of rodent

Philip Myers's akodont (Akodon philipmyersi) is a recently described species of grass mouse from Misiones Province, Argentina. Like other grass mice, A. philipmyersi is a small, non-descript, greyish-brown mouse with prominent ears. The species was recognized as distinct from other grass mice on the basis of unique features of karyology, genetic sequence, cranial measurements, and general morphology.

== Etymology ==
The specific epithet for this animal, philipmyersi, is named after renowned mammalogist Philip Myers of the University of Michigan Museum of Zoology and major contributor to the Animal Diversity Web. Philip Myers has made major contributions in determining the relationships among members of the genus Akodon.

== Description ==
A. philipmyersi is described as having a small body size, tail, and limbs relative to other members of the genus. The animals have a karyotype of (2n=36, FN=42). The species differs from its only sympatric relative, A. montensis, by 11.3-11.4% sequence divergence at the cytochrome b gene. A. montensis can also be distinguished by its 2n=24 chromosome number and by its preference for forest instead of grassland habitat.

== Natural history ==
A. philipmyersi seems to prefer grassland areas with tall vegetation. Remains of the animals have also been found in owl pellets.

== Relation to other species ==
Pardiñas et al. (2005) suggest that the closest relative to A. philipmyersi is A. lindberghi, but this is only weakly supported statistically. Morphometric analyses and a shared number of chromosomes (n=36), also point to a similarity between these two species. The two are distinct both morphometrically and genetically (cytochrome b divergence = 10.1%).
