= São Paulo grass mouse =

Conservation status
- Data Deficient (IUCN 3.1)

Scientific classification
- Kingdom: Animalia
- Phylum: Chordata
- Class: Mammalia
- Order: Rodentia
- Family: Cricetidae
- Subfamily: Sigmodontinae
- Genus: Akodon
- Species: A. sanctipaulensis

Binomial name
- Akodon sanctipaulensis Hershkovitz, 1990

Species of rodent

The São Paulo grass mouse (Akodon sanctipaulensis) is a rodent species from South America. It is found in Brazil.
