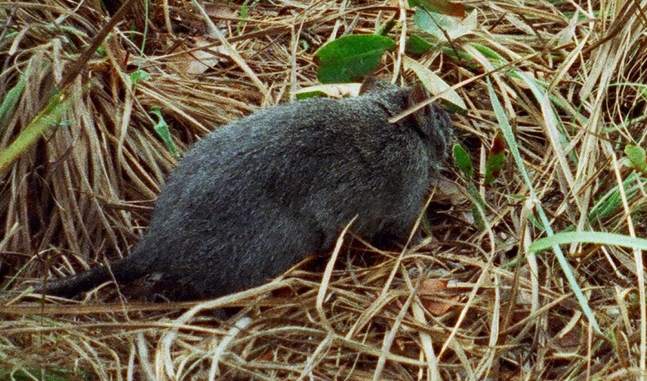
- K. tomentosus in Santa Cruz, Bolivia

Conservation status
- Least Concern (IUCN 3.1)

Scientific classification
- Kingdom: Animalia
- Phylum: Chordata
- Class: Mammalia
- Order: Rodentia
- Family: Cricetidae
- Subfamily: Sigmodontinae
- Tribe: Akodontini
- Genus: Kunsia; Hershkovitz, 1966
- Species: K. tomentosus

Binomial name
- Kunsia tomentosus Lichtenstein, 1830

= Woolly giant rat =

Species of rodent

The woolly giant rat (Kunsia tomentosus) is a species of large burrowing rodent native to South America. No subspecies are currently recognised. It is the only member of the genus Kunsia.

== Description ==
The woolly giant rat is an exceptionally large rat and the largest living species of sigmodontine rodent, with short limbs and powerful claws. Nonetheless, individuals vary considerably in size, ranging from 19 to 29 cm (7.5 to 11.4 in) in head-body length, with a relatively short tail 15 to 20 cm (5.9 to 7.9 in) long. Body weight varies from 240 to 630 g (8.5 to 22.2 oz); no other sigmodontine species has a maximum weight above 400 g (14 oz). The fur is thick and coarse, with an almost uniform shade of dark grey or brown across the whole of the body, although slightly paler on the throat and underside. The tail is scaly and almost hairless, and dark grey to blackish in colour. The rhinarium is large, and the ears short and rounded. Females have eight teats.

== Distribution and habitat ==
Woolly giant rats inhabit the cerrado of central Brazil, and the Llanos de Moxos of northern Bolivia between 60 and 750 m (200 and 2,460 ft) elevation. Within Brazil, they are recorded from the states of Goiás, Mato Grosso and Rondônia. The rats live in areas of open grassland, grassy shrub, and savannah woodland, and are not found in more densely forested habitats.

== Biology and behaviour ==
The rats are omnivorous, feeding on the roots of grasses, and on termites and orthoptera, which they locate by smell. They are thought to be either nocturnal or crepuscular, but to spend most of the time underground in burrows, emerging primarily during the rainy season. Little is known of the rats' biology, although they are thought to breed twice a year.
