= Silent grass mouse =

Conservation status
- Vulnerable (IUCN 3.1)

Scientific classification
- Kingdom: Animalia
- Phylum: Chordata
- Class: Mammalia
- Order: Rodentia
- Family: Cricetidae
- Subfamily: Sigmodontinae
- Genus: Akodon
- Species: A. surdus

Binomial name
- Akodon surdus Thomas, 1917

Species of rodent

The silent grass mouse or slate-bellied akodont (Akodon surdus) is a species of rodent in the family Cricetidae. It is endemic to Peru.

== Distribution and habitat ==
The silent grass mouse lives primarily in the Cusco Region in the south east of Peru at altitudes of between 1,500 and 3,000m. Its habitat is generally confined to humid montane forests and it can also persist in selectively logged areas.

== Threats ==
The grass mouse is listed as a vulnerable species on the IUCN Red List and its numbers are thought to be decreasing. This is mainly due to human settlement, commercial clearcutting and farmland creation which is degrading and declining the Andean forests where the grass mouse lives.
