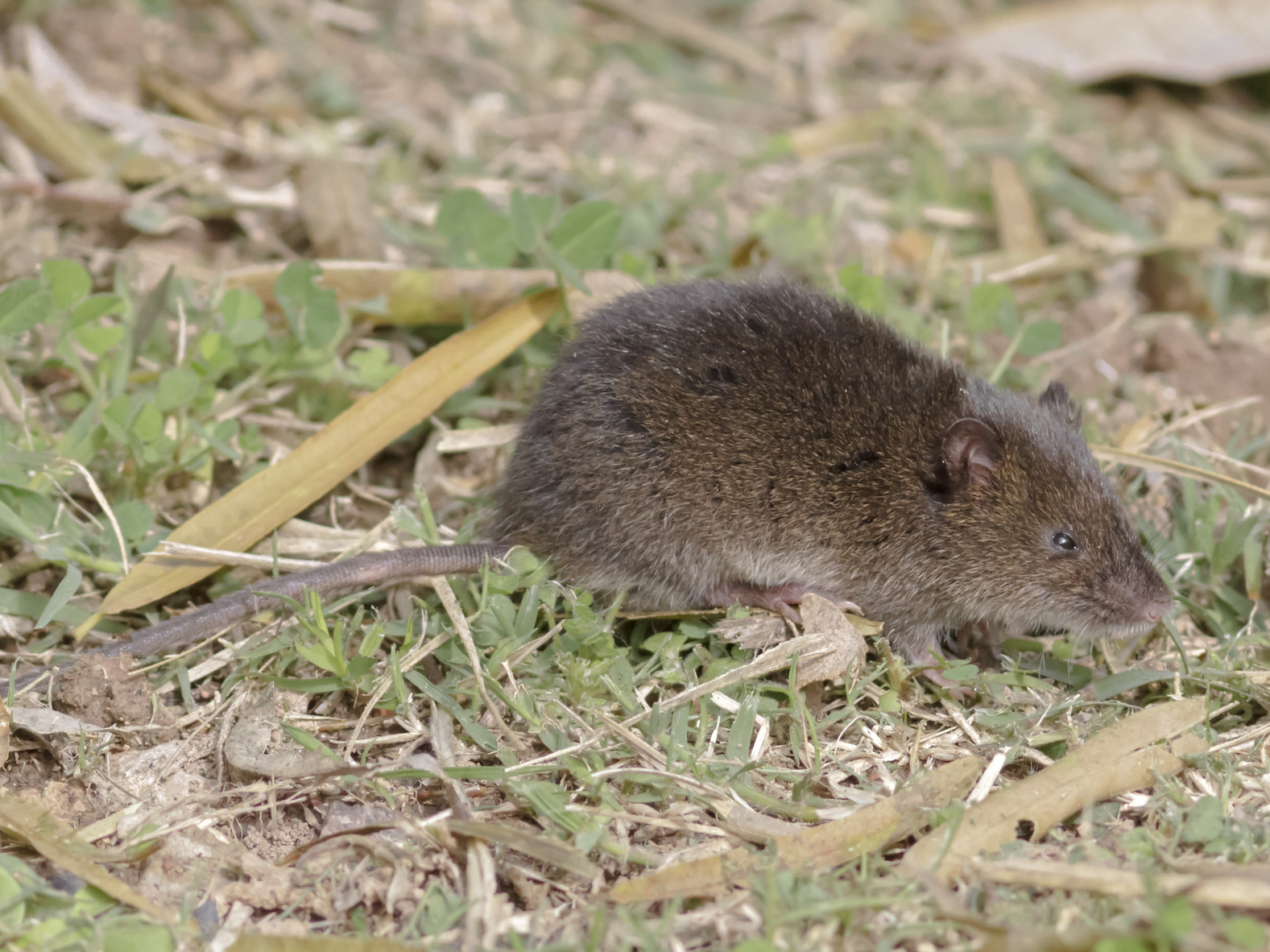

Conservation status
- Least Concern (IUCN 3.1)

Scientific classification
- Kingdom: Animalia
- Phylum: Chordata
- Class: Mammalia
- Infraclass: Placentalia
- Order: Rodentia
- Family: Cricetidae
- Subfamily: Sigmodontinae
- Tribe: Akodontini
- Genus: Deltamys; Thomas, 1917
- Species: D. kempi

Binomial name
- Deltamys kempi Thomas, 1917

Synonyms
- Akodon kempi (Thomas, 1917)

= Kemp's grass mouse =

Species of rodent

Kemp's grass mouse (Deltamys kempi) is a species of South American rodent in the family Cricetidae. It is the only species in the genus Deltamys. It was formerly considered a member of the genus Akodon, but is now considered sufficiently distinct to warrant its own genus. It is named for Robin Kemp, who collected specimens of mice from the area for the British Museum.

== Description ==
Kemp's grass mouse is noticeably larger than a house mouse, measuring about 18 cm (7.1 in) in total length, including the 8 cm (3.1 in) tail. The eyes and ears are small, and the limbs relatively short. The fur is dense and soft, and is a very dark brown, almost black, over most of the body, fading to brownish-grey on the underparts. The tail has only fine hairs, and is visibly scaled along its length.

== Distribution and habitat ==
Kemp's grass mouse is found around the mouth of the Río de la Plata in the Buenos Aires and Entre Ríos provinces of Argentina, throughout southern and eastern Uruguay, and near the coast of Rio Grande do Sul in extreme southern Brazil. Within this region, it is found in treeless wetlands such as marshlands and grassy floodplains, and less commonly on the margins of forested areas.

Two subspecies are recognised:

- Deltamys kempi kempi - Argentina
- Deltamys kempi langguthi - Uruguay and Brazil

== Biology and behaviour ==
Despite living in wetlands, Kemp's grass mouse is not an especially strong swimmer, and has feet more adapted for digging. They have been reported to nest above the ground, for example in fallen tree trunks, or under grasses or leaves. They are omnivorous, but with a higher proportion of animal matter, especially insects, in their diet than is the case for most other rodents. Common predators include the barn owl.
