= El Dorado grass mouse =

Conservation status
- Least Concern (IUCN 3.1)

Scientific classification
- Kingdom: Animalia
- Phylum: Chordata
- Class: Mammalia
- Order: Rodentia
- Family: Cricetidae
- Subfamily: Sigmodontinae
- Genus: Akodon
- Species: A. orophilus

Binomial name
- Akodon orophilus Osgood, 1913

Species of rodent

The El Dorado grass mouse or Utcubamba akodont (Akodon orophilus) is a species of rodent in the family Cricetidae. It is found in Ecuador and Peru.
