= Molina's grass mouse =

Conservation status
- Least Concern (IUCN 3.1)

Scientific classification
- Kingdom: Animalia
- Phylum: Chordata
- Class: Mammalia
- Order: Rodentia
- Family: Cricetidae
- Subfamily: Sigmodontinae
- Genus: Akodon
- Species: A. molinae

Binomial name
- Akodon molinae Contreras, 1968

Species of rodent

Molina's grass mouse (Akodon molinae) is a species of rodent in the family Cricetidae. It is found only in Argentina.
