= Akodon budini =

Conservation status
- Least Concern (IUCN 3.1)

Scientific classification
- Kingdom: Animalia
- Phylum: Chordata
- Class: Mammalia
- Order: Rodentia
- Family: Cricetidae
- Subfamily: Sigmodontinae
- Genus: Akodon
- Species: A. budini

Binomial name
- Akodon budini (Thomas, 1918)

Species of rodent

Akodon budini, also known as Budin's akodont or Budin's grass mouse, is a species of rodent in the family Cricetidae. It is found in the Andes of northwestern Argentina and adjacent Bolivia. The species is named after Emilio Budin, an Argentine specimen collector who worked with Oldfield Thomas.

== Literature cited ==
- Musser, G. G.; Carleton, M. D. (2005). "Superfamily Muroidea". In Wilson, D. E.; Reeder, D. M. (eds.). Mammal Species of the World: A Taxonomic and Geographic Reference (3rd ed.). Johns Hopkins University Press. pp. 894–1531. ISBN 978-0-8018-8221-0. OCLC 62265494.
