= Oligoryzomys andinus =

Conservation status
- Least Concern (IUCN 3.1)

Scientific classification
- Kingdom: Animalia
- Phylum: Chordata
- Class: Mammalia
- Order: Rodentia
- Family: Cricetidae
- Subfamily: Sigmodontinae
- Genus: Oligoryzomys
- Species: O. andinus

Binomial name
- Oligoryzomys andinus (Osgood, 1914)

Species of rodent

Oligoryzomys andinus, also known as the Andean colilargo or Andean pygmy rice rat, is a species of rodent in genus Oligoryzomys of family Cricetidae. It is found in the Andes of southern Peru and western Bolivia, but may in fact include more than one species. Its karyotype has 2n = 60 and FNa = 70.

== Literature cited ==
- Musser, G. G.; Carleton, M. D. (2005). "Superfamily Muroidea". In Wilson, D. E.; Reeder, D. M. (eds.). Mammal Species of the World: A Taxonomic and Geographic Reference (3rd ed.). Johns Hopkins University Press. pp. 894–1531. ISBN 978-0-8018-8221-0. OCLC 62265494.
