= Cloud forest grass mouse =

Conservation status
- Least Concern (IUCN 3.1)

Scientific classification
- Kingdom: Animalia
- Phylum: Chordata
- Class: Mammalia
- Order: Rodentia
- Family: Cricetidae
- Subfamily: Sigmodontinae
- Genus: Akodon
- Species: A. torques

Binomial name
- Akodon torques (Thomas, 1917)

Species of rodent

The cloud forest grass mouse (Akodon torques) is a species of rodent in the family Cricetidae. It is found only in Peru.
