= Intelligent grass mouse =

Conservation status
- Least Concern (IUCN 3.1)

Scientific classification
- Kingdom: Animalia
- Phylum: Chordata
- Class: Mammalia
- Order: Rodentia
- Family: Cricetidae
- Subfamily: Sigmodontinae
- Genus: Akodon
- Species: A. iniscatus

Binomial name
- Akodon iniscatus Thomas, 1919

Species of rodent

The intelligent grass mouse or Patagonian akodont (Akodon iniscatus) is a species of rodent in the family Cricetidae. The species is found in Argentina and Chile.
