= Lindbergh's grass mouse =

Conservation status
- Data Deficient (IUCN 3.1)

Scientific classification
- Kingdom: Animalia
- Phylum: Chordata
- Class: Mammalia
- Order: Rodentia
- Family: Cricetidae
- Subfamily: Sigmodontinae
- Genus: Akodon
- Species: A. lindberghi

Binomial name
- Akodon lindberghi Hershkovitz, 1990

Species of rodent

Lindbergh's grass mouse (Akodon lindberghi) is a rodent species from South America. It is found in Brazil.
