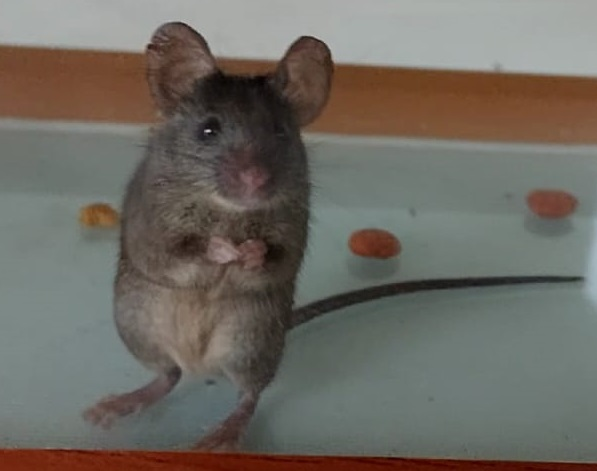

Conservation status
- Least Concern (IUCN 3.1)

Scientific classification
- Kingdom: Animalia
- Phylum: Chordata
- Class: Mammalia
- Order: Rodentia
- Family: Cricetidae
- Subfamily: Sigmodontinae
- Genus: Akodon
- Species: A. paranaensis

Binomial name
- Akodon paranaensis Christoff et al., 2000

= Paraná grass mouse =

Species of rodent

The Paraná grass mouse (Akodon paranaensis) is a South American rodent species of the family Cricetidae. It is found in northeastern Argentina and southeastern Brazil.
