= Reig's grass mouse =

Conservation status
- Least Concern (IUCN 3.1)

Scientific classification
- Kingdom: Animalia
- Phylum: Chordata
- Class: Mammalia
- Order: Rodentia
- Family: Cricetidae
- Subfamily: Sigmodontinae
- Genus: Akodon
- Species: A. reigi

Binomial name
- Akodon reigi González, Langguth & Oliveira, 1998

Species of rodent

Reig's grass mouse (Akodon reigi) is a South American rodent species found in Brazil and Uruguay. It is named after Argentine biologist Osvaldo Reig (1929–1992).
