= Lee Garnett Day =

Lee Garnett Day (May 5, 1890-May 24, 1968) was an American explorer, Army officer, and executive of General Foods.

Day was the son of Henry Mason Day, and graduated from Yale University in 1911. His explorations primarily consisted of trek with Alfred M. Collins to South America in 1915 along with staff from Yale University and the Field Museum. He served in France during World War I. He later became vice-president of Baker-Bennett-Day, Inc. a General Foods subsidiary. He left that position in 1940 and returned to the Army.

His wife Nancy Sales Day predeceased him, and he was survived by a daughter and six grandchildren.

The great elaenia (Elaenia dayi) and Day's grass mouse (Akodon dayi) are named in his honor.
