= Tarija akodont =

Conservation status
- Data Deficient (IUCN 3.1)

Scientific classification
- Domain: Eukaryota
- Kingdom: Animalia
- Phylum: Chordata
- Class: Mammalia
- Order: Rodentia
- Family: Cricetidae
- Subfamily: Sigmodontinae
- Genus: Akodon
- Species: A. pervalens

Binomial name
- Akodon pervalens Christoff et al., 2000

Species of rodent

The Tarija akodont (Akodon pervalens), or Tarija grass mouse, is a species in the family Cricetidae native to Bolivia, and possibly Argentina.
