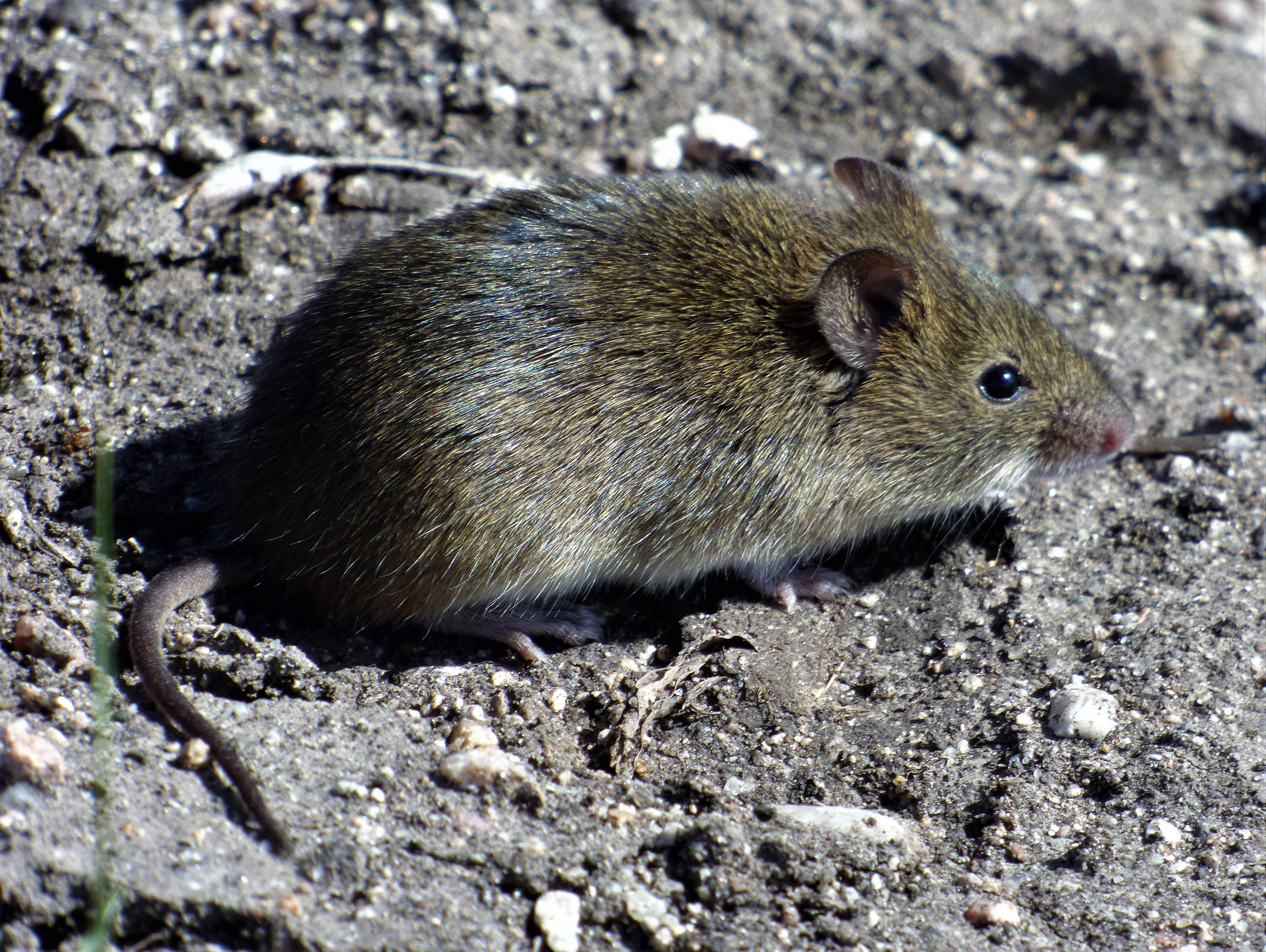
- Akodon azarae

Scientific classification
- Domain: Eukaryota
- Kingdom: Animalia
- Phylum: Chordata
- Class: Mammalia
- Order: Rodentia
- Family: Cricetidae
- Subfamily: Sigmodontinae
- Tribe: Akodontini
- Genus: Akodon; Meyen, 1833

Type species
- Akodon boliviensis Meyen, 1833

Species
- See text

Synonyms
- Acodon Agassiz, 1846; Axodon Giebel, 1855; Chalcomys Thomas, 1916; Hypsimys Thomas, 1918; Microxus Thomas, 1909; Plectomys Borchert and Hansen, 1983 (nomen nudum)

= Akodon =

Akodon Temporal range: Late Pliocene - Recent

Genus of rodents

Akodon is a genus consisting of South American grass mice. They mostly occur south of the Amazon Basin and along the Andes north to Venezuela, but are absent from much of the basin itself, the far south of the continent, and the lowlands west of the Andes. Akodon is one of the most species-rich genera of Neotropical rodents. Species of Akodon are known to inhabit a variety of habitats from tropical and tropical moist forests to altiplano and desert. Fossils are known from the late Pliocene onwards.

== Taxonomy ==
Akodon is the largest genus in the tribe Akodontini. Three of its synonyms—Chalcomys, Hypsimys, and particularly Microxus—have sometimes been regarded as distinct genera. Neomicroxus was separated in 2013. Previously associated with Akodon, the genera Abrothrix, Deltamys, Necromys, Thalpomys, and Thaptomys are currently recognized as distinct. Some species of the tribe Abrotrichini are called akodons.

The genus contains the following species:

- Akodon aerosus
- Akodon affinis
- Akodon albiventer
- Akodon azarae
- Akodon boliviensis
- Akodon budini
- Akodon caenosus (Note: In 2010, this species was split from A. lutescens to include the formerly recognized A. aliquantulus.)
- Akodon cursor
- Akodon dayi
- Akodon dolores (Note: This species includes the formerly recognized A. molinae.)
- Akodon fumeus
- Akodon glaucinus (Note: This species was split from A. simulator in 2008.)
- Akodon iniscatus
- Akodon juninensis
- Akodon kofordi
- Akodon lindberghi
- Akodon lutescens
- Akodon mimus
- Akodon molinae
- Akodon mollis
- Akodon montensis
- Akodon mystax
- Akodon neocenus
- Akodon orophilus
- Akodon paranaensis
- Akodon pervalens
- Akodon philipmyersi (Note: Newly described in 2005.)
- Akodon polopi (Note: Newly described in 2010. This species includes Akodon viridescens, another new species described in 2010.)
- Akodon reigi
- Akodon sanctipaulensis
- Akodon serrensis
- Akodon siberiae
- Akodon simulator
- Akodon spegazzinii (Note: This species includes the previously recognized A. leucolimnaeus and A. oenos.)
- Akodon subfuscus
- Akodon surdus
- Akodon sylvanus
- Akodon tartareus
- Akodon toba
- Akodon torques
- Akodon varius

== Literature cited ==
- Braun, J.K., Coyner, B.S., Mares, M.A. and Van Den Bussche, R.A. 2008. Phylogenetic relationships of South American grass mice of the Akodon varius group (Rodentia, Cricetidae, Sigmodontinae) in South America. Journal of Mammalogy 89(3):768-777.
- Braun, J. K., M. A. Mares, B. S. Coyner, and R. A. Van Den Bussche. 2010. New species of Akodon (Rodentia: Cricetidae: Sigmodontinae) from central Argentina. Journal of Mammalogy, 91(2):387–400.
- D'Elía, G., Jayat, J.P., Ortiz, P.E., Salazar-Bravo, J. and Pardiñas, U.F.J. 2011. Akodon polopi Jayat et al., 2010 is a senior subjective synonym of Akodon viridescens Braun et al., 2010 (first page). Zootaxa 2744:62–64.
- Jayat, J.P., Ortiz, P.E., Salazar-Bravo, J., Pardiñas, U.F.J. and D'Elía, G. 2010. The Akodon boliviensis species group (Rodentia: Cricetidae: Sigmodontinae) in Argentina: species limits and distribution, with the description of a new entity (abstract). Zootaxa 2409:1–61.
- Musser, G.G. and Carleton, M.D. 2005. Superfamily Muroidea. Pp. 894–1531 in Wilson, D.E. and Reeder, D.M. (eds.). Mammal Species of the World: a taxonomic and geographic reference. 3rd ed. Baltimore: The Johns Hopkins University Press, 2 vols., 2142 pp. ISBN 978-0-8018-8221-0
- Pardiñas, U.F.J., D'Elía, G., Cirignoli, S. and Suarez, P. 2005. A new species of Akodon (Rodentia, Cricetidae) from the Northern Campos grasslands of Argentina. Journal of Mammalogy 86(3):462–474.
- Pardiñas, U.F.J., Teta, P., D'Elía, G. and Diaz, G.B. 2011. Taxonomic status of Akodon oenos (Rodentia, Sigmodontinae), an obscure species from West Central Argentina (abstract). Zootaxa 2749:47–61.
