= Cochabamba grass mouse =

Conservation status
- Near Threatened (IUCN 3.1)

Scientific classification
- Kingdom: Animalia
- Phylum: Chordata
- Class: Mammalia
- Order: Rodentia
- Family: Cricetidae
- Subfamily: Sigmodontinae
- Genus: Akodon
- Subgenus: Hypsimys
- Species: A. siberiae

Binomial name
- Akodon siberiae Myers & Patton, 1989

Species of rodent

The Cochabamba grass mouse (Akodon siberiae) is a species of rodent in the family Cricetidae. It is found only in Bolivia. Its natural habitat is subtropical or tropical moist lowland forests.
