= Andean rat =

Conservation status
- Least Concern (IUCN 3.1)

Scientific classification
- Kingdom: Animalia
- Phylum: Chordata
- Class: Mammalia
- Infraclass: Placentalia
- Order: Rodentia
- Family: Cricetidae
- Subfamily: Sigmodontinae
- Tribe: Akodontini
- Genus: Lenoxus; Thomas, 1909
- Species: L. apicalis

Binomial name
- Lenoxus apicalis (J.A. Allen, 1900)

Synonyms
- Oxymycterus apicalis J.A. Allen, 1900

Species of rodent

The Andean rat (Lenoxus apicalis), or white-tailed akodont, is the only species in the genus Lenoxus. It is a rodent in the tribe Akodontini found on the eastern slopes of the Andes of eastern Peru and western Bolivia. Examination of its genome shows that this species is not closely related to Oxymycterus as had previously been thought, but is quite distinct, having diverged from the other Akodontini soon after the basal radiation of the entire group.

== Description ==
The Andean rat is a medium-sized species, with a tail as long as or rather longer than its head-and-body length. The head has a rather long but broadly based snout and exposed, small, sparsely haired ears. The dorsal surface of the body is blackish suffused with grey, and the flanks are paler grey. The underparts are greyish-brown, tinged with buff. The tail is greyish-brown both above and underneath, and is sparsely haired, with numerous small scales. The terminal quarter of the tail is white and is very distinctive. The upper surfaces of the feet are grey, which contrasts with the white toes.

== Distribution and habitat ==
The Andean rat is endemic to the eastern slopes of the Andes, its range including southern Peru and northern Bolivia. It occurs in montane and cloud forest at altitudes between 1,500 and 2,500 m (4,900 and 8,200 ft).

== Ecology ==
The natural history of this species is poorly known. Specimens in Peru were trapped in runways among thick ferns and moss-covered tree roots, while in Bolivia they were trapped in somewhat drier, less dense forest.
