= White-throated grass mouse =

Conservation status
- Least Concern (IUCN 3.1)

Scientific classification
- Kingdom: Animalia
- Phylum: Chordata
- Class: Mammalia
- Order: Rodentia
- Family: Cricetidae
- Subfamily: Sigmodontinae
- Genus: Akodon
- Species: A. simulator

Binomial name
- Akodon simulator Thomas, 1916

Species of rodent

The white-throated or grey-bellied grass mouse (Akodon simulator) is a species of rodent in the family Cricetidae. It is found in Argentina and Bolivia.
