= Day's grass mouse =

Conservation status
- Least Concern (IUCN 3.1)

Scientific classification
- Kingdom: Animalia
- Phylum: Chordata
- Class: Mammalia
- Order: Rodentia
- Family: Cricetidae
- Subfamily: Sigmodontinae
- Genus: Akodon
- Species: A. dayi

Binomial name
- Akodon dayi Osgood, 1916

Species of rodent

Day's grass mouse (Akodon dayi), also known as the dusky akodont, is a species of rodent in the family Cricetidae. It is endemic to Bolivia.

== Taxonomy and history ==
A. dayi was described by Wilfred Hudson Osgood in 1916. The specific epithet dayi was given in honour of Lee Garnett Day, an American businessman and army officer who partially financed the 1915 expedition during which the holotype was collected.

== Distribution and habitat ==
A. dayi is known to occur from southern Pando Department to west-central Santa Cruz Department at altitudes of 0–2,450 m (0–8,038 ft) above sea level. It typically inhabits grassy areas, gardens, and clearings, but is also found in montane habitats and the evergreen forests of the Yungas bioregion.
