= Variable grass mouse =

Conservation status
- Data Deficient (IUCN 3.1)

Scientific classification
- Domain: Eukaryota
- Kingdom: Animalia
- Phylum: Chordata
- Class: Mammalia
- Order: Rodentia
- Family: Cricetidae
- Subfamily: Sigmodontinae
- Genus: Akodon
- Species: A. varius

Binomial name
- Akodon varius Thomas, 1902

Species of rodent

The variable grass mouse (Akodon varius) is a species of rodent in the family Cricetidae. It is known only from Bolivia, where it is found at elevations from 400 to 3000 m.
