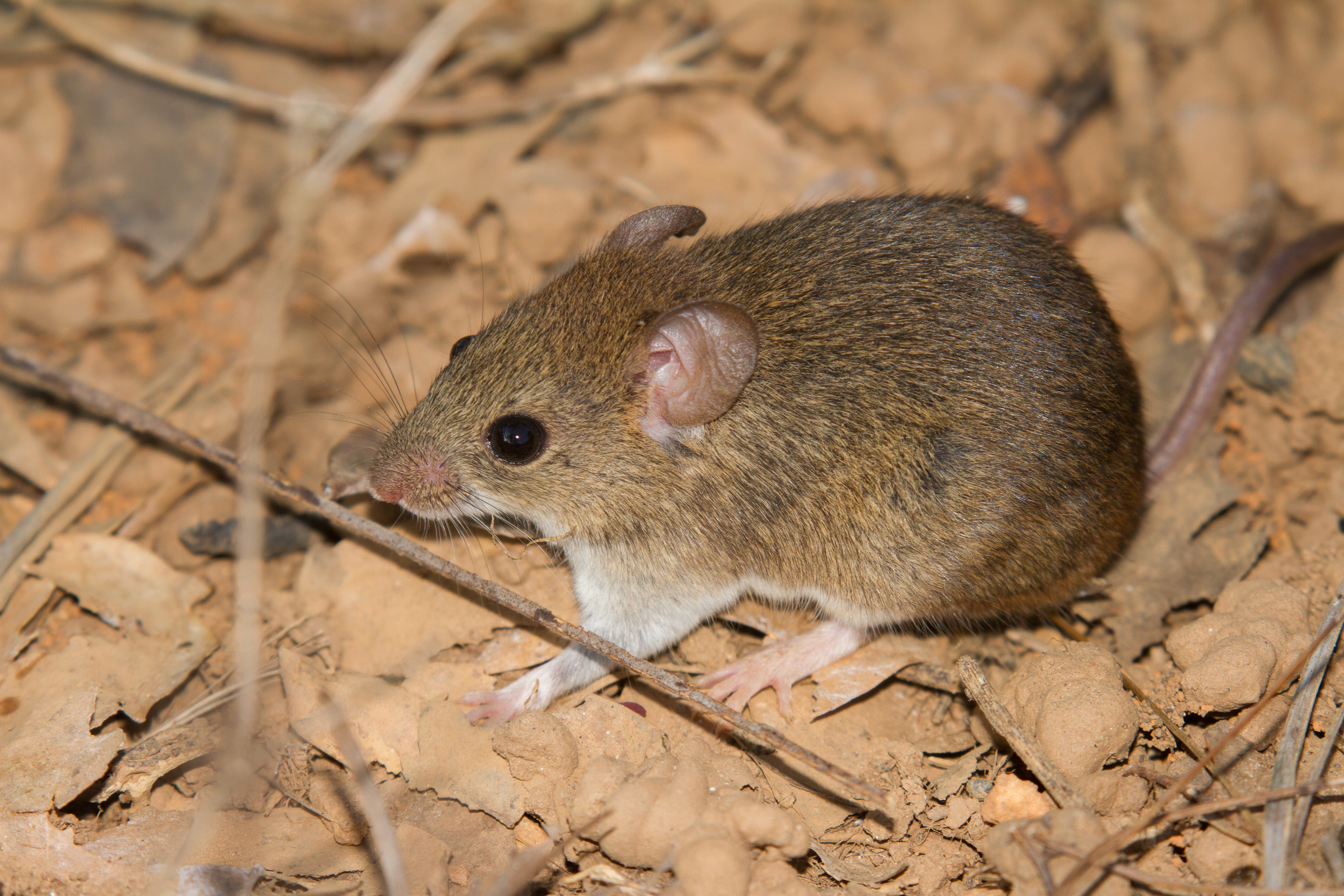
- Necromys lasiurus

Scientific classification
- Kingdom: Animalia
- Phylum: Chordata
- Class: Mammalia
- Infraclass: Placentalia
- Order: Rodentia
- Family: Cricetidae
- Subfamily: Sigmodontinae
- Tribe: Akodontini; Vorontzov, 1959

Genera
- See text

= Akodontini =

Akodontini Temporal range: Late Pliocene - Recent

Tribe of rodents

Akodontini is the second most speciose rodent tribe of the subfamily Sigmodontinae. It includes at least 106 living species in 19 genera and is distributed mainly in the southern half of South America, with only two genera extending into Guyana (Podoxymys) and Venezuela (Necromys). It also includes genera previously placed in tribe Scapteromyini. The following genera are now generally recognized:

- Akodon
- Bibimys
- Blarinomys
- Brucepattersonius
- Deltamys
- Juscelinomys
- Kunsia
- Lenoxus
- Necromys (previously Bolomys or Cabreramys)
- Neomicroxus
- Oxymycterus
- Podoxymys
- Scapteromys
- Thalpomys
- Thaptomys

Chalcomys, Hypsimys, and Microxus have been synonymized under the genus Akodon.

Several other genera were previously placed in Akodontini, but are now placed in a separate tribe Abrotrichini, largely on molecular grounds.

== Literature cited ==
- D'Elía, G., Pardiñas, U.F.J., Teta, P. and Patton, J.L. 2007. Definition and diagnosis of a new tribe of sigmodontine rodents (Cricetidae: Sigmodontinae), and a revised classification of the subfamily. Gayana 71(2):187-194.
- Musser, G.G. and Carleton, M.D. 2005. Superfamily Muroidea. Pp. 894–1531 in Wilson, D.E. and Reeder, D.M. (eds.). Mammal Species of the World: a taxonomic and geographic reference. 3rd ed. Baltimore: The Johns Hopkins University Press, 2 vols., 2142 pp. ISBN 978-0-8018-8221-0
