= Thespian grass mouse =

Conservation status
- Least Concern (IUCN 3.1)

Scientific classification
- Kingdom: Animalia
- Phylum: Chordata
- Class: Mammalia
- Order: Rodentia
- Family: Cricetidae
- Subfamily: Sigmodontinae
- Genus: Akodon
- Species: A. mimus

Binomial name
- Akodon mimus (Thomas, 1901)

Species of rodent

The thespian grass mouse or hocicudo-like akodont (Akodon mimus) is a species of rodent in the family Cricetidae. It is found in Bolivia and Peru.
