= Dolorous grass mouse =

Conservation status
- Least Concern (IUCN 3.1)

Scientific classification
- Kingdom: Animalia
- Phylum: Chordata
- Class: Mammalia
- Order: Rodentia
- Family: Cricetidae
- Subfamily: Sigmodontinae
- Genus: Akodon
- Species: A. dolores

Binomial name
- Akodon dolores Thomas, 1916

Species of rodent

The dolorous grass mouse or Córdoba akodont (Akodon dolores) is a species of rodent in the family Cricetidae. It is found only in Argentina. It is an invertivore and can grow as large as 50.5 g (1.78 oz).
