= Philip Hershkovitz =

American mammalogist (1909–1997)

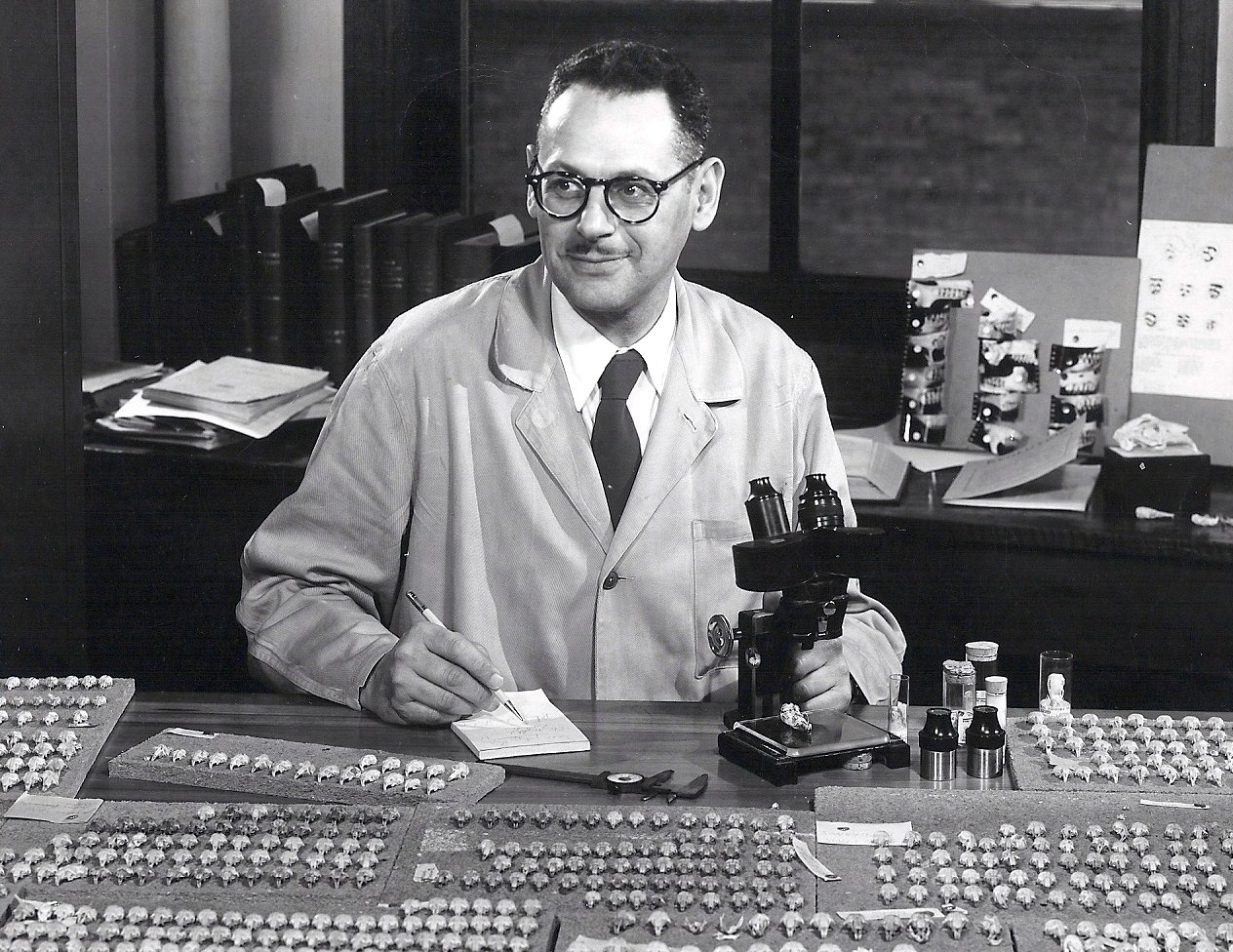
- About 1962, FMNH archives and PH files
- Born: October 12, 1909; Pittsburgh
- Died: February 15, 1997 (aged 87); Chicago
- Education: University of Pittsburgh, University of Michigan at Ann Arbor
- Known for: Mammals of the Neotropics
- Spouse: Marie Pierrette Dode
- Children: Francine, Michael, Mark
- Scientific career
- Fields: Mammalogy
- Workplaces: Field Museum of Natural History, Chicago
- Author abbrev. (zoology): Hershkovitz

Philip Hershkovitz (12 October 1909 – 15 February 1997) was an American mammalogist. Born in Pittsburgh, he attended the Universities of Pittsburgh and Michigan and lived in South America collecting mammals. In 1947, he was appointed a curator at the Field Museum of Natural History in Chicago and he continued to work there until his death. He published much on the mammals of the Neotropics, particularly primates and rodents, and described almost 70 new species and subspecies of mammals. About a dozen species have been named after him.

== Life ==
=== Early life ===
Philip Hershkovitz was born on 12 October 1909 in Pittsburgh to Jewish parents Aba and Bertha (Halpern) Hershkovitz. He was the second child and only son among four siblings. He reported that his father died when he was nine years old. After graduating from Schenley High School in 1927, he attended the University of Pittsburgh from 1929 to 1931, majoring in zoology, before transferring to the University of Michigan at Ann Arbor, which had more course offerings in zoology. He was an assistant in the zoology department and did taxidermical work. In 1932, he went to Texas to collect Typhlomolge rathbuni cave salamanders. He wanted to also trap small mammals, which he found more interesting, but had no traps to do that. On a chance visit to the Field Museum of Natural History (FMNH) in Chicago, he befriended the Curator of Mammals there, Colin Campbell Sanborn, who loaned him the supplies he needed. This event was the beginning of Hershkovitz's long relationship with the FMNH.

As the Great Depression worsened, Hershkovitz was no longer able to afford life in Michigan, and in 1933 he decided to move to Ecuador, which he was told was one of the cheapest countries in the Americas to live in. He collected a number of mammal specimens and learned to speak Spanish, supporting himself in part by trading in horses. He returned in 1937 and again enrolled at Ann Arbor, graduating in 1938. Subsequently, he became a graduate student there and got his MSc degree in 1940. He then entered the doctoral program, but in 1941 he was awarded a Walter Rathbone Bacon Traveling Scholarship by the United States National Museum in Washington, D.C., to work in the Santa Marta area of northern Colombia, where he stayed till 1943.

Hershkovitz enlisted in the U.S. Armed Services during World War II and served the Office of Strategic Services in Europe. In 1945, he married Anne Marie Pierrette Dode, whom he had met in France, and the same year he returned to America to continue his Bacon Scholarship studies in Washington, D.C., where his first child of three—Francine, Michael, and Mark—was born in 1946. Hershkovitz did not reveal his Jewish descent to them for some time.

=== Curator at the Field Museum ===
In 1947, Hershkovitz was offered a position as Assistant Curator of Mammals at the FMNH and accepted, although it meant that he was unable to complete his doctoral studies. He immediately went back to the field and stayed in Colombia until his curatorial duties called him back to Chicago in 1952. His Colombian collections remained at the center of his research interests afterward, as he entirely revised many taxa of which he had found representatives in Colombia. He had a good relationship with Chief Curator of the Department of Zoology Karl P. Schmidt and actively took care of his curatorial duties (appointed Associate Curator in 1954 and full Curator in 1956). Schmidt retired in 1957 and his successor, Austin P. Rand, enjoyed a less positive relation with Hershkovitz, and the latter detached himself from the museum's day-to-day affairs. Ultimately, in 1962, Hershkovitz was replaced as Curator of Mammals by Joseph Moore and took the unprecedented title of Research Curator. He worked in the field in Suriname in 1960–61 and in Bolivia in 1965–66.

=== Retirement and death ===
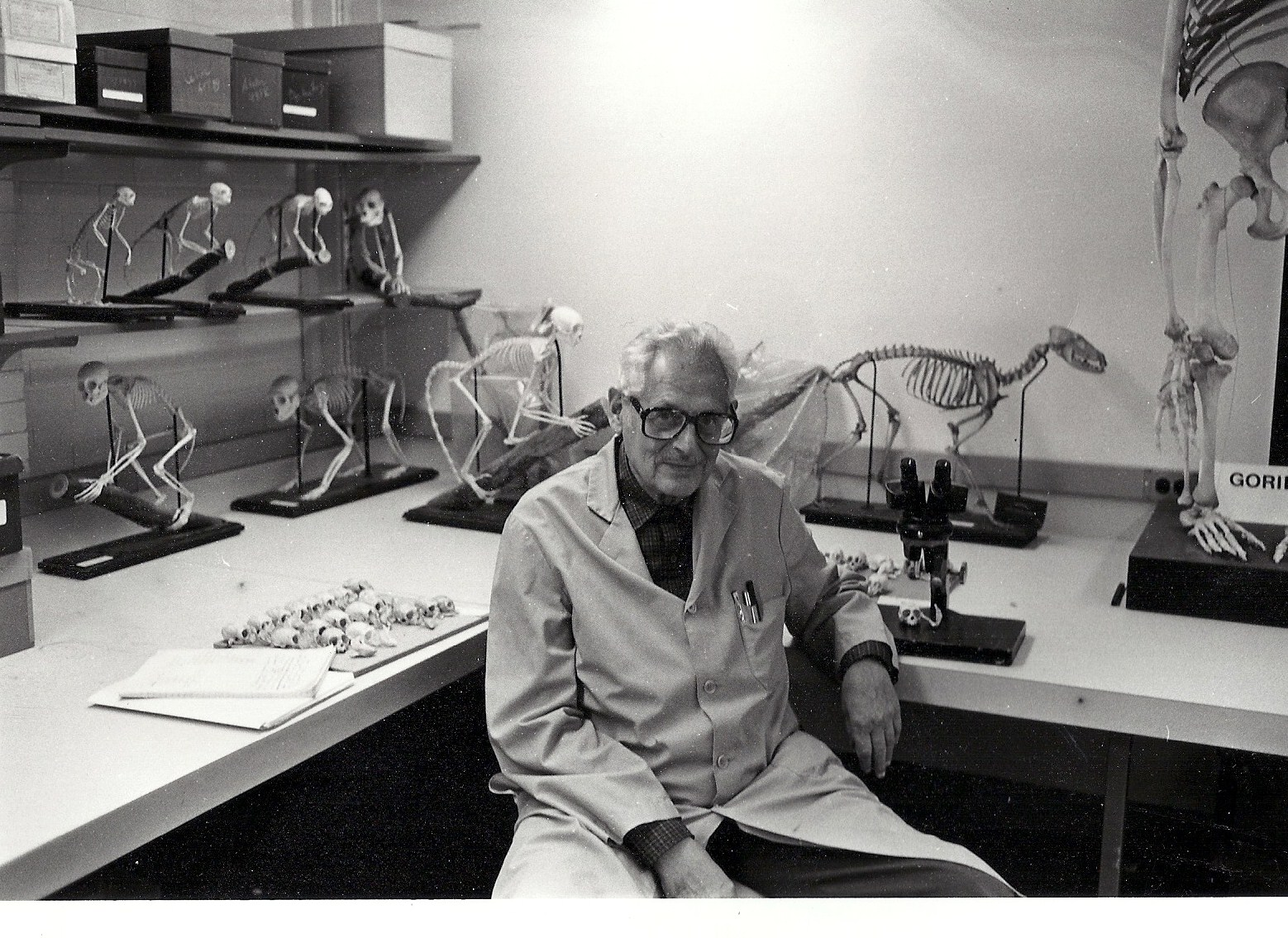
1987 Fieldiana Zoology, No: 39 (festschrift)

Hershkovitz retired in 1974, but continued his research unabated as Curator Emeritus, and in 1980–81 he worked in the field in Peru. In 1987, a festschrift was published for him under the title Studies in Neotropical Mammalogy: Essays in Honor of Philip Hershkovitz, an honor that had been given to only three previous Field Museum scientists. It included papers on some of the fields Hershkovitz had worked in, a biography and bibliography of him by Bruce Patterson, and a review, written by Hershkovitz himself, of the historical development of mammalogy in the Neotropics. By 1987, he was still tireless, spending long days in the museum without even pausing for lunch. He worked in Brazil on several occasions, the last in 1992, after which his health prevented him from going. He died from complications resulting from bone cancer at the Northwestern Memorial Hospital in Chicago on 15 February 1997, at the age of 87; he continued to work on his mammalogical research until two weeks before his death. He was survived by two sons, a son-in-law, and two grandchildren.

== Research ==
Hershkovitz published extensively on the biology of each of the twelve orders of Neotropical mammals, focusing generally on taxonomy and biogeography. He wrote 164 papers, including both broad monographs and smaller contributions, and described 67 new species and subspecies and 13 new genera. He was an independent researcher, writing most of his contributions alone; only three he co-authored with other scientists. He participated in some fiery scientific debates, with views that according to Patterson's biographical note "brand him as something other than conciliatory or diplomatic". In 1968, he published his theory of metachromism, which attempts to explain variation in fur coloration among mammals through the loss of one of two classes of pigments in the hairs.

Hershkovitz may have been most well known for his studies of primates, to the extent that many thought him a primatologist, but he was quick to point out that, as Patterson phrases it, "nothing could be further from the truth". He had published on primates earlier, but did not give them special attention until the 1960s, when grant opportunities persuaded him to begin studying them, first Callitrichidae and later Cebidae. In 1977, he published a review of callitrichids that according to Ronald H. Pine was "the most heroically monumental revisionary monograph ever devoted to a Neotropical group"; it was to be the first volume of a comprehensive treatment of living New World monkeys. He continued with smaller-scale papers on cebids and assembled notes to continue his series on living New World monkeys, but eventually financial support ceased and Hershkovitz was relieved to be able to spend the last decade of his life studying the mammals that most "intrigued and animated" him—rodents and marsupials.

One of Hershkovitz's first papers was on rodents, describing two new Ecuadorean squirrels in 1938, and he continued to publish about the group, including reviews of Nectomys, Oecomys, Phyllotini, Holochilus, and scapteromyines between 1944 and 1966. He played an important role in formalizing and defining the tribal groups within the sigmodontine rodents of South America. However, his contributions at the time have been cited as examples of "vague notions of clade recognition", "phylogenetic transcendentalism" unsubstantiated by data, and "[misleading simplification] of a complex reality". He was engaged in discussions on the significance of penis morphology in sigmodontines and on their origin. Over eighty years old, he resumed studies of rodents in Brazil and discovered many additional new species. Shortly after his death, head of the FMNH's mammal division Lawrence Heaney said "The information he gathered was the basis for much of the conservation planning that's being done now in most of the major habitats in South America."

In 1966, he published a Catalog of Living Whales; he had originally intended to review the whales living off the South American coast, but expanded the project to all the world's species. This Catalog remains an invaluable resource for any student of cetaceans who needs to know the meaning of some obscure old name and has been called "a taxonomic Rosetta Stone". Although Hershkovitz was not a marine mammalogist, a brief obituary on him appeared in Marine Mammals Science in 1998. He treated many other mammals in his publications, including reviews of marsupials such as Gracilinanus, Philander, and Dromiciops, the tapirs of the Americas, some of the cottontail rabbits of South America, and also published extensively on nomenclature.

== Honors ==
Hershkovitz was made a corresponding member of The Explorers Club in 1977. In 1988, he was the Honorary President of the XIIth Congress of the International Primatological Society. In 1991, the American Society of Primatologists named him a Distinguished Primatologist and the American Society of Mammalogists awarded him Honorary Membership.

Several animals have been named in honor of Hershkovitz:

- the bird Tinamus osgoodi hershkovitzi Blake, 1953
- the batfly genus Hershkovitzia Guimarães and D'Andretta, 1956
- the pocket mouse Heteromys anomalus hershkovitzi Hernandez-Camacho, 1956
- the Colombian weasel Mustela felipei Izor and de la Torre, 1978
- the night monkey Aotus hershkovitzi Ramírez-Cerqueira, 1983 (now a junior synonym for A. lemurinus)
- the field mouse Abrothrix hershkovitzi (Patterson et al., 1984)
- the fossil primate Mohanamico hershkovitzi Luchterhand et al., 1986
- the tick Saimirioptes hershkovitzi O'Connor, 1987
- the fossil swamp rat Scapteromys hershkovitzi Reig, 1994
- the chewing louse Eutrichophilus hershkovitzi Timm and Price, 1994
- the fossil rodent Bensonomys hershkovitzi Martin et al., 2002
