= Mikea Forest =

Forest region in southwestern Madagascar

Coordinates: 22.6°S 43.4°E

Mikea Forest French: Forêt des Mikea

Geography
- Location: Atsimo-Andrefana, Madagascar
- Area – maximum: 3,706 km^{2} (1,431 sq mi); 4,252 km^{2} (1,642 sq mi) in 1962

Administration
- Status: unprotected
- Visitation: 5000–8000 per year 1993

Ecology
- Disturbance: slash and burn charcoal production
- Dominant tree species: Didierea madagascariensis
- Indicator plants: Didiereaceae; Euphorbia; Adansonia; Commiphora

The Mikea Forest (or Forêt des Mikea) is a forested region of southwestern Madagascar, between Manombo and Morombe, inhabited by the hunter-gatherer Mikea people. More specifically, it stretches from Route Nationale 9 to the west coast and from Mangoky south to the Manombo River. It lies at the transition between dry deciduous forest, which is more common further north in Madagascar, and spiny forest, which is dominant in southwestern Madagascar. Its underlying geology is unconsolidated sand, and the region contains several freshwater lakes. The Forêt des Mikea is one of the largest remaining continuous forest blocks in western and southern Madagascar, but it is not protected and it is threatened by human development.

This transitional terrain is one of the least protected of Madagascar's habitats. This soil composition has resulted in a collection of plant and animal species, even distinct from adjacent vegetation on limestone. Small terrestrial mammals found here include the rodents Macrotarsomys bastardi, Macrotarsomys petteri, and the introduced black rat (Rattus rattus); the tenrecs Tenrec ecaudatus, Setifer setosus, Echinops telfairi, Geogale aurita, and Microgale jenkinsae; and the shrew Suncus madagascariensis. Macrotarsomys petteri and Microgale jenkinsae are unique to the forest and were only discovered in the 2000s. The popular ring-tailed lemur (Lemur catta) also occurs in Mikea Forest, though it seems to always have been present in very low densities. Since the habitat has started to disappear, the remaining populations appear to have become isolated.

As of 2000, of the 27 threatened species of bird in Madagascar, only two (Monias benschi and Uratelornis chimaera) were not found in protected areas, but both were fairly common within the unprotected forests of Mikea. Monias benschi had an estimated population of 115,000, while the Uratelornis chimaera population was estimated at fewer than 15,000. A survey published in 2005 reported that 59 species of reptile were identified near the eastern shore of Lake Ranobe in the southern Mikea Forest, five of which were vulnerable. Some of these species include Matoatoa brevipes, Oplurus fierinensis, Furcifer antimena, Furcifer belalandaensis, Phelsuma standingi, and Pyxis arachnoides. The flora includes the baobabs Adansonia za and A. rubrostipa.

Between the 1960s and the 2000s, forest cover had declined by 16% and deforestation was accelerating, having doubled in the last five years of that time period. The factors behind the deforestation at that time were slash and burn agriculture for maize cultivation in the northern regions of the forest and charcoal production in the southern regions. As of 2000, recommendations had been made to establish a large protected area, to provide aid to improve agriculture, and to establish a network of community-based conservation areas. In 2001, Madagascar National Parks, known then as ANGAP, was considering a new national park in the area. By 2008, a national park encompassing 184,630 hectares (712.9 sq mi) in two parcels had been submitted to the Supreme Council for Nature Protection (a state entity that deals with natural resource management) and was in the process of being finalized.

== See also ==
- Anjanamba Cave

== Sources ==
Journals & reports

- Blanc-Pamard, C. (2009). "The Mikea Forest Under Threat (southwest Madagascar): How public policy leads to conflicting territories" (PDF). Field Actions Science Report. 3. Institut Veolia Environnement: 1–12. (HTML)
- D'Cruze, N.C.; Sable, J.A. (2005). "The Reptiles of Southern Mikea Forest, Madagascar" (PDF). Herpetological Bulletin (3): 2–8. Archived from the original (PDF) on 2013-08-23.
- Goodman, S. M.; Soarimalala, V. (2005). "A new species of Macrotarsomys (Rodentia: Muridae: Nesomyinae) from southwestern Madagascar". Proceedings of the Biological Society of Washington. 118 (2): 450–464. doi:10.2988/0006-324X(2005)118[450:ANSOMR]2.0.CO;2. S2CID 86070739.
- Seddon, N.; Butchart, S.; Tobias, J.; Yount, J. W.; Remi Ramanampamonjy, J.; Randrianizahana, H. (2000). "Conservation issues and priorities in the Mikea Forest of south-west Madagascar". Oryx. 34 (4): 287–304. doi:10.1046/j.1365-3008.2000.00134.x.

Books

- Goodman, S.M.; Benstead, J.P., eds. (2003). The Natural History of Madagascar. University of Chicago Press. ISBN 0-226-30306-3.
  - Du Puy, D.J.; Moat, J. "Using Geological Substrate to Identify and Map Primary Vegetation Types in Madagascar and the Implications for Planning Biodiversity Conservation". In Goodman & Benstead (2003), pp. 51–74.
  - Fenn, M.D. "The Spiny Forest Ecoregion". In Goodman & Benstead (2003), pp. 1525–1530.
  - Hawkins, A.F.A.; Goodman, S.M. "Introduction to the Birds". In Goodman & Benstead (2003), pp. 1019–1044.
  - Hawkins, A.F.A.; Seddon, N. "Mesitornithidae, Mesites". In Goodman & Benstead (2003), pp. 1095–1098.
  - Nicoll, M.E. "Forests outside Protected Areas". In Goodman & Benstead (2003), pp. 1432–1437.
- Gould, L.; Sauther, M.L., eds. (2006). Lemurs: Ecology and Adaptation. Springer. ISBN 978-0-387-34585-7.
  - Gould, L. "Chapter 12: Lemur catta Ecology: What We Know and What We Need to Know". In Gould & Sauther (2006), pp. 255–274.
