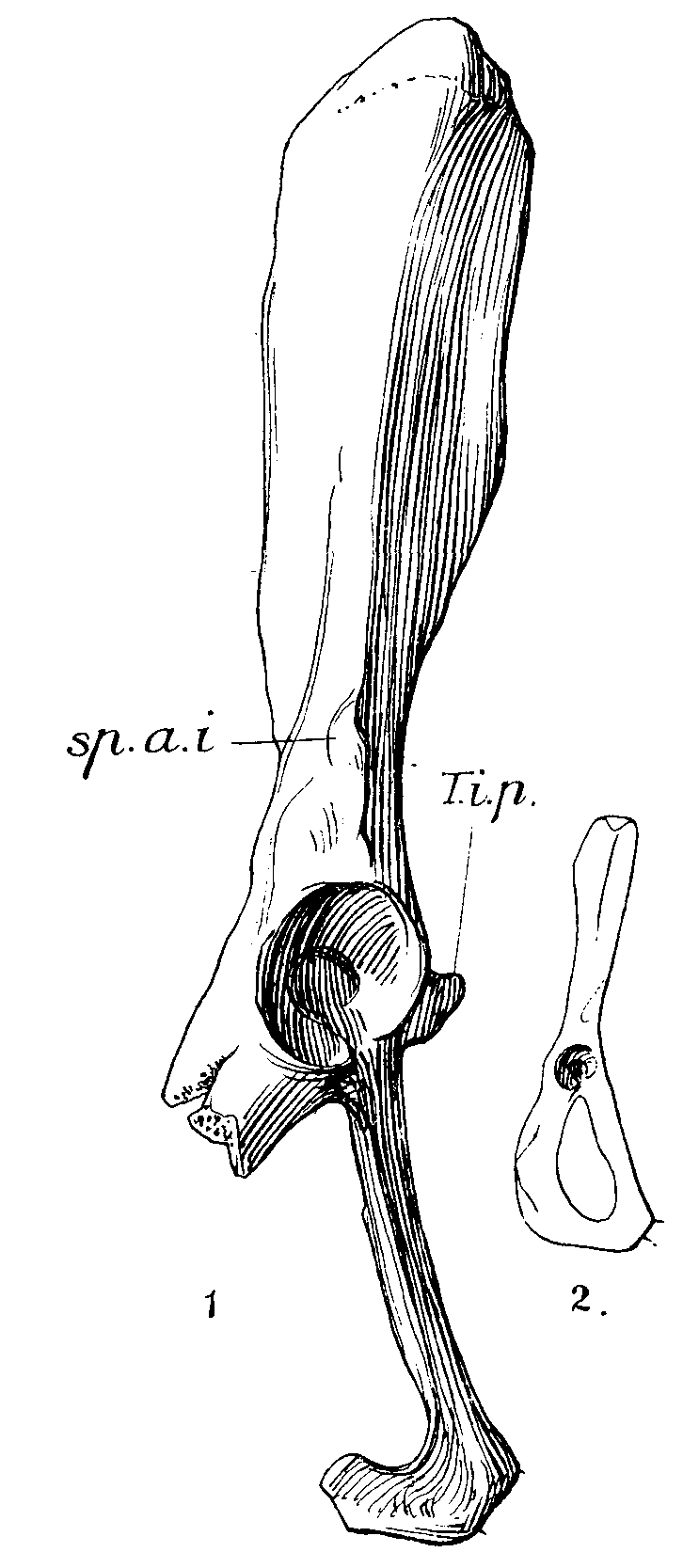
- (1) Right innominate (pelvic bone) of Plesiorycteropus madagascariensis (British Museum number M 7085, holotype of Myoryctes rapeto Forsyth Major, 1908) and (2) right innominate of a European water vole (Arvicola amphibius), for comparison

Scientific classification
- Kingdom: Animalia
- Phylum: Chordata
- Class: Mammalia
- Order: Afrosoricida
- Suborder: Tenrecomorpha
- Genus: †Plesiorycteropus; Filhol, 1895

Species
- Plesiorycteropus germainepetterae MacPhee, 1994; Plesiorycteropus madagascariensis Filhol, 1895; Synonyms: Myoryctes rapeto Forsyth Major, 1908; Hypogeomys boulei G. Grandidier, 1912; Majoria rapeto: (Forsyth Major 1908) Thomas, 1915
- Sites where Plesiorycteropus has been found. Blue: P. madagascariensis and P. germainepetterae; green: P. madagascariensis; red: Plesiorycteropus, species uncertain.

Synonyms
- Myoryctes Forsyth Major, 1908 non Ebert 1863 (Note: Preoccupied name.); Majoria Thomas, 1915 (Note: Nomen novum (replacement name) for Myoryctes Forsyth Major.)

= Plesiorycteropus =

Plesiorycteropus Temporal range: Holocene

Extinct genus of mammals from Madagascar

Plesiorycteropus, also known as the bibymalagasy or Malagasy aardvark, is a recently extinct genus of mammals from Madagascar. Upon its description in 1895, it was classified with the aardvark, but more recent molecular evidence instead suggests that it is most closely related to the tenrecs (a group extant on the island). Two species are currently recognized, the larger P. madagascariensis and the smaller P. germainepetterae. They probably overlapped in distribution, as subfossil remains of both species have been found in the same site.

Knowledge of the skeletal anatomy is limited, as only limb, partial pelvis, and skull bones have been recovered to date. Plesiorycteropus was probably a digging animal that fed on insects such as termites and ants. It also shows adaptations for climbing and sitting. Estimates of its mass range from 6 to 18 kilograms (13 to 40 lb). When and why it became extinct remains unknown. One bone has been radiocarbon dated to 200 BCE; forest destruction by humans may have contributed to its extinction.

== Taxonomy ==
=== Identification and species ===
French naturalist Henri Filhol first described Plesiorycteropus madagascariensis in 1895 on the basis of a partial skull found at the cave of Belo. His description was vague even by 19th-century standards, but he placed the animal close to the aardvark (Orycteropus). The generic name combines Ancient Greek plesio- "near" with Orycteropus, the genus of the aardvark, and the specific name refers to Madagascar. Charles Lamberton, who had access to a larger sample for his 1946 review of the genus, noted substantial variation, but did not attempt to differentiate multiple species. In 1994, Ross MacPhee again reviewed Plesiorycteropus and was able to separate two species, the larger P. madagascariensis and a new, smaller species that he named Plesiorycteropus germainepetterae after scientist Germaine Petter. The two species differ in a number of morphological characters in addition to size.

Remains of Plesiorycteropus have been misidentified as rodents and primates. Charles Immanuel Forsyth Major described Myoryctes rapeto in 1908 as a "giant subfossil rat" on the basis of two innominate bones (pelvic bones). The generic name was replaced by Majoria in 1915, because Myoryctes was preoccupied by the name of a nematode worm. However, according to MacPhee, innominates of Majoria are identical to those assigned to Plesiorycteropus. Guillaume Grandidier assigned a well-preserved femur (upper leg bone) to a gigantic relative of the living votsovotsa (Hypogeomys antimena), a large rodent, which he described as Hypogeomys boulei. Lamberton identified this femur as Plesiorycteropus and MacPhee concurred. Remains of both Majoria rapeto and Hypogeomys boulei fall at the upper end of the size range of the genus, indicating that they are referable to P. madagascariensis. Another Plesiorycteropus innominate was mistakenly assigned to Daubentonia robusta, the extinct giant aye-aye, and other material has been misidentified as of a dwarf lemur (Cheirogaleus).

=== Relationships ===
Filhol had classified Plesiorycteropus as close to the aardvark on the basis of morphological similarities. In his 1946 review, Charles Lamberton was unable to provide a definitive allocation, confused by the various similarities he saw with aardvarks, pangolins, armadillos, and anteaters. He believed it was most likely a primitive, isolated member of "Edentata", a group in which he included aardvarks, pangolins, and Xenarthra (sloths, armadillos, and anteaters). He rejected some alternatives, such as a close affinity to aardvarks or the possibility that the material assigned to Plesiorycteropus did not in fact represent a single animal. Bryan Patterson, who revised tubulidentates (the order of which the aardvark is the only living representative) in the 1970s, accepted Plesiorycteropus as a member of the group, dismissing many similarities with pangolins and other animals as convergent. However, he placed it as the only member of its own subfamily Plesiorycteropodinae in view of its differences from other tubulidentates (subfamily Orycteropodinae), and hypothesized that it arrived on Madagascar in the Eocene, at the same time as the lemurs. Johannes Thewissen, who critiqued some aspects of Patterson's classification in 1985, also accepted Plesiorycteropus as a tubulidentate without comment.

Reviewing Patterson's and Thewissen's contributions in 1994, Ross MacPhee found little support for the classification of Plesiorycteropus as a tubulidentate in their data. MacPhee used a cladistic analysis of eutherians to ascertain the relationships of the genus, but found that while different analytic variants supported different affinities—with aardvarks, hyraxes, ungulates (hooved mammals), and even lipotyphlans (shrews, moles, hedgehogs, and allies)—there was no compelling evidence linking it to any other eutherian group. Therefore, he erected a separate order for Plesiorycteropus, named Bibymalagasia, arguing that it would be unacceptable to leave a Recent eutherian unassigned to any order and that discovery of more material, or further analysis, was unlikely to demonstrate close affinities of Plesiorycteropus with any other order. He considered it possible but unlikely that a few fossil taxa, such as Palaeorycteropus and Leptomanis from the Paleogene of France, would eventually be found to be bibymalagasians. Various analyses published by Robert Asher and colleagues in 2003, 2005, and 2007, based on morphology combined with DNA sequence data in some analyses, produced different estimates of the relationships of Plesiorycteropus, some placing it within Afrotheria close to aardvarks or Afrosoricida, but others supporting a relationship with the hedgehog Erinaceus. A 2004 morphological study by Inés Horovitz, focusing on extinct South American ungulates (such as Notoungulata and Litopterna), placed Plesiorycteropus among tubulidentates and closer to the extinct aardvark relative Myorycteropus than to Orycteropus.

A 2013 study by Michael Buckley examined preserved collagen sequences in Plesiorycteropus bones. He found the animal was most closely related to the tenrecs, a family of insectivorous afrotherian mammals endemic to Madagascar. Tenrecs are believed to have diversified from a common ancestor that lived 29–37 million years (Ma) ago after dispersing from Africa via a single rafting event. Buckley's analysis showed that Plesiorycteropus and the two members of subfamily Tenrecinae tested formed a monophyletic group, within a larger clade in which golden moles are the sister group; he suggested that Plesiorycteropus should be placed in the order Tenrecoidea along with tenrecs as well as African otter shrews and golden moles (the latter two diverged from tenrecs about 47–53 Ma ago and 59–69 Ma ago, respectively). He did not test members of the other two Tenrecidae subfamilies or otter shrews, leaving open the possibility that Plesiorycteropus nests within Tenrecidae.

=== Common names ===
"Madagascar aardvark" has been used as a common name for Plesiorycteropus, but MacPhee considered it inappropriate because the animal may not be related to aardvarks. Instead, he proposed "bibymalagasy" as a common name, a manufactured Malagasy word meaning "Malagasy animal".

== Description ==
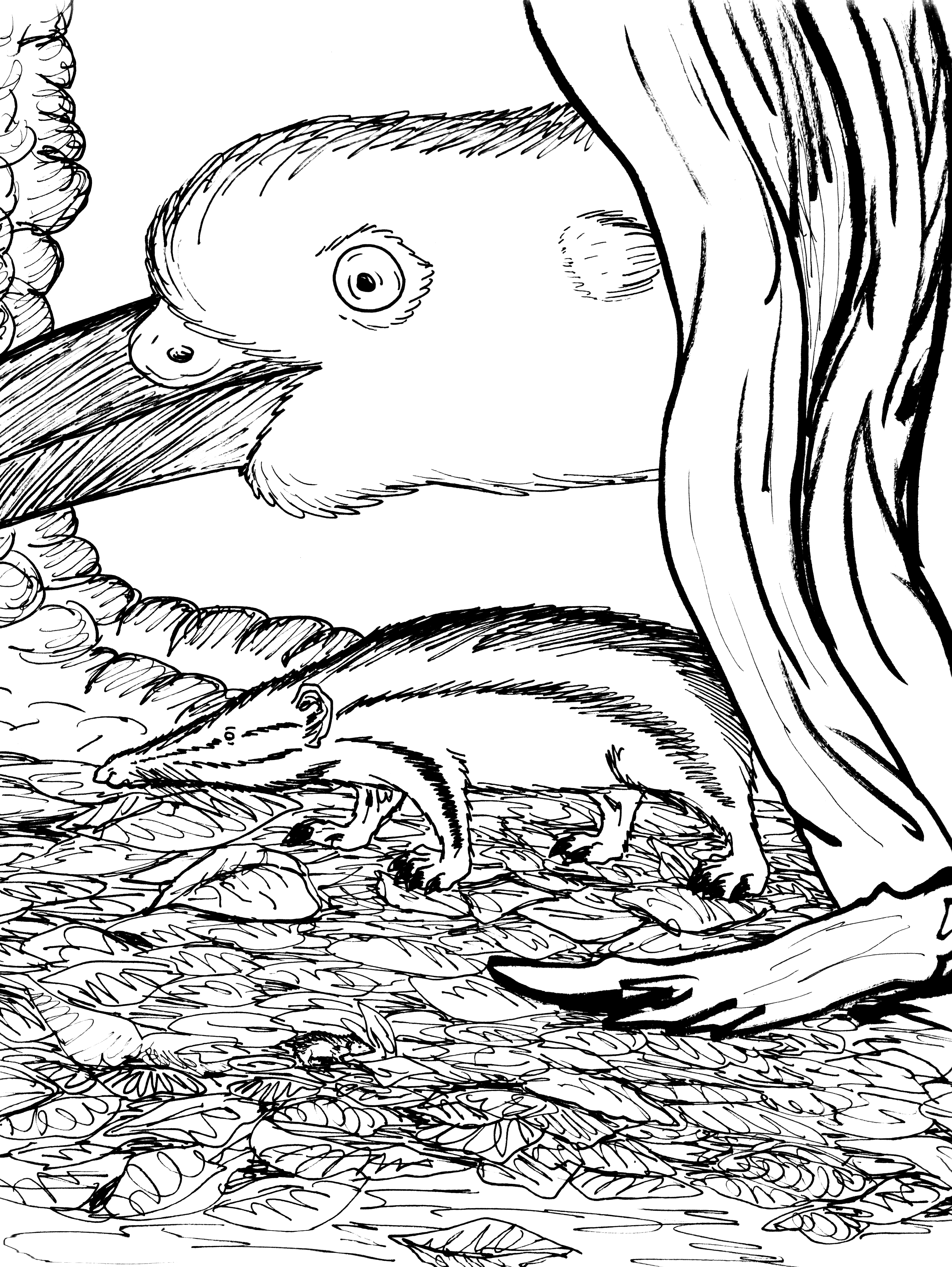
Artistic interpretation of Plesiorycteropus madagascarensis as a large, tenrec-like animal

Plesiorycteropus is known from a number of subfossil bones, comparable to coverage of some of the poorly known subfossil lemurs, such as Daubentonia robusta. The material includes several skulls, all of which are missing the facial bones, complete long bones such as the femur and humerus (upper arm bone), and other bones, but some elements are still unknown, including most of the skeleton of the hand and foot. There is little reason to assume it was similar in general form to the aardvark. No teeth or jaws referable to Plesiorycteropus have been found, and it is generally assumed that the animal was toothless.

Based on the area of a femur cross-section, MacPhee calculated estimates of body mass. The lowest estimate, based on comparative data from armadillos and pangolins, was 6 kilograms (13 lb) for the smallest femur he had (referable to P. germainepetterae) and the highest estimate, based on comparative data from caviomorph rodents, was 18 kilograms (40 lb) for the largest available femur (P. madagascariensis); estimates from primates fell between those extremes. MacPhee favored the lower estimates, because those were based on armadillos, which have femora similar to those of Plesiorycteropus. On the other hand, the caviomorph model produced a better estimate of brain size in Plesiorycteropus. Any of the estimates makes it considerably larger than the largest living tenrec, Tenrec ecaudatus, at up to 2 kilograms (4.4 lb). The higher estimates would make it larger than any extant native Malagasy mammal. (Note: The largest of these, such as the indri and fossa, do not exceed 10 kg.) This is consistent with the trend for larger members of the late Pleistocene and Holocene faunas of Madagascar and elsewhere to have been at higher risk of extinction.

=== Skull ===
There are four known skulls (three of P. madagascariensis and one of P. germainepetterae), each of which is damaged. All are missing the front (rostral) part, and three are broken at about the same place (at the paranasal cavities, at the front of the braincase), suggesting that the front part of the skull was thinner and more fragile than the back part, which consists of thick bones. MacPhee estimated maximum skull length in P. madagascariensis at 101 millimetres (4.0 in). The length of the frontal bone averages 35.4 millimetres (1.39 in) in P. madagascariensis and is 29.4 millimetres (1.16 in) in P. germainepetterae.

The robust nasal bones, preserved in a single specimen, are widest at the front, a feature unusual among placentals that is also seen in armadillos, and are also unusually flat. The ethmoid labyrinth, in the nasal cavity, was large, suggesting that Plesiorycteropus had a good sense of smell. A much larger part of the nasal septum, which separates the left and right nasal cavities, is ossified than usual in other mammals; MacPhee could find a similar condition only in sloths, which have a very short nose. The lacrimal bone is relatively large. At it is a single lacrimal canal, which opens near the suture between the frontal and lacrimal bones, like in lipotyphlans. There is a small tubercle (absent in aardvarks) near this opening. The orbital cavity, which houses the eyes, is relatively short, similar to the situation in pangolins and armadillos. A distinct tubercle is present on the suture between the frontal and parietal bones in P. germainepetterae, but not P. madagascariensis. P. madagascariensis has a more expansive braincase and a less pronounced narrowing between the orbits. The foramen rotundum, an opening in the bone of the orbit, is present. The optic canal, which houses the nerves leading to the eyes, is narrow, suggesting that the eyes were small, similar to many other tenrecoids. As in pangolins and xenarthrans, little of the squamosal bone can be seen from above. The temporal lines on the braincase, which anchor muscles, are located lower in P. germainepetterae. Like in aardvarks, the parietals are relatively large. An interparietal bone is present. Unlike in anteaters and pangolins, the occiput (the back of the skull) is flat and vertical. Plesiorycteropus lacks notches above the foramen magnum (the opening that connects the brain to the spinal cord), which are present in aardvarks. The nuchal crest, a projection on the occiput, is straight in P. madagascariensis, but in P. germainepetterae it is interrupted in the middle, similar to the situation in armadillos and hyraxes.

In their descriptions of Plesiorycteropus, Lamberton and Patterson posited different interpretations of the location of the mandibular fossa, where the mandible (lower jaw) articulates with the cranium. MacPhee found problems with either interpretation and suggested that the true mandibular fossa was part of the area Lamberton identified as such, at the side of the braincase. The fossa is small and low, suggesting that the animal was not capable of powerful biting. At the back of this fossa is a pseudoglenoid proces, which is more prominent in P. germainepetterae. In P. germainepetterae but not P. madagascariensis, a small opening, perhaps the vascular foramen, is present next to the foramen ovale. The petrosal bone forms a relatively large portion of the roof of the tympanic cavity, which houses the middle ear; parts of the petrosal are more developed in P. madagascariensis. Endocasts (casts of the inside of the skull) indicate that the neopallium part of the brain was relatively small.

=== Postcranium ===
There are 34 known vertebrae of Plesiorycteropus. The animal had at least seven sacral and five or six lumbar vertebrae. A find of associated caudal vertebrae from the base of the tail, which diminish in size only slowly from front to back, suggests that the tail was long. There is no evidence for the additional joints between the vertebrae that are characteristic of xenarthrans. In the seven known thoracic (chest) vertebrae, the articulations with the intervertebral disks are bean-shaped and much wider from side to side than from top to bottom. In the back thoracics and all lumbars, a longitudinal transarcual canal is present in the neural arch.

A scapula (shoulder blade), only tentatively assigned to Plesiorycteropus, has the acromion, a process, present, but the structure is probably not as large as in aardvarks or armadillos. Six humeri have been found; the bone is robust and an entepicondylar foramen is present in the distal (far) end. There are three examples of the radius, a compact and massive bone in Plesiorycteropus which resembles the pangolin radius. The three known ulnae show that the olecranon process at the proximal (near) end is well-developed, but the distal end is narrow; the morphology of the bone suggests that the animal was capable of producing much force with its arms.

The innominate is known from seven examples, but most are quite incomplete. It includes a narrow ilium and long ischium. The ischial tuberosity, a narrow rough piece of bone in most placentals, is broad and smooth in Plesiorycteropus. With 17 specimens, the femur is the best represented long bone. It is distinctive in its long neck, similar only to the gymnure Echinosorex according to MacPhee. A projection known as the third trochanter is larger in P. madagascariensis. The tibia and fibula are extensively fused into a tibiofibula, of which eight examples are known. This bone resembles that of armadillos in the extensive fusion, the compression of the shaft of the tibia, the narrowness of the articulation surface at the distal end, and the broad space between the bones. Unlike in armadillos, the tibia and fibula are not inclined relative to each other, but about parallel. The astragalus, which is known from four examples, is wide and short and contains a uniquely large posteromedial process. Seven metapodials (middle hand or foot bones) are known, rather variable in size, but MacPhee was unable to separate metacarpals (from the hand) and metatarsals (from the foot). All are rather short and are broad proximally and narrow distally. Among the few known phalanges, the proximal phalange is shorter than the middle one and the distal phalanges are narrow and clawlike.

== Ecology, behavior, and extinction ==
Collection sites
Site	ger.	mad.	sp.
Ambolisatra		+	+
Ampasambazimba	+	+	+
Ampoza			+
Anjohibe		+	+
Ankevo			?
Anovaha			+
Antsirabe		+	+
Belo		+	
Bemifany			+
Masinandraina			+
Sirave			+
Abbreviations: ger.: P. germainepetterae; mad.: P. madagascariensis; sp.: Plesiorycteropus, species uncertain

The forelimbs of Plesiorycteropus show specializations for scratch-digging, in which the forefeet are placed against the substrate, the claws are entered into the substrate, and the forefeet are then drawn back against the body. Other parts of the body also show such specializations, including large hindlimbs and a broad tail. Some aspects of the vertebral column and the pelvis suggest that the animal often assumed an erect, or sitting, posture. The animal may also have been capable of climbing, perhaps in a manner similar to gymnures and shrew tenrecs, which are small-eyed like Plesiorycteropus. It was probably myrmecophagous, eating insects such as ants and termites, but may also have eaten other soft food, and because of its small size probably did not forage in termite mounds, as the aardvark does.

MacPhee had material of Plesiorycteropus from twelve sites in central, western, and southern Madagascar. It and other recently extinct Madagascar mammals may have lived in and near wetlands. P. madagascariensis is known from sites throughout this range, but P. germainepetterae has only been definitely recorded from the center; small bones from southern sites may also belong to it. Thus, the two species apparently had widely overlapping ranges.

Little is known about the extinction of Plesiorycteropus, but MacPhee assumed it may have happened around 1000 years ago, when the extinction of the rest of the subfossil fauna of Madagascar is thought to have concluded. Nothing like it was reported by 17th-century European explorers of the island, and one bone has been radiocarbon dated to around 2150 Before Present (200 BCE). Its extinction is somewhat anomalous, as other recently extinct Madagascan animals—such as subfossil lemurs, Malagasy hippopotamuses, the giant fossa, and elephant birds—were generally larger and not exclusively insectivorous; also, some species with likely more specialized diets, such as the falanouc (Eupleres goudoti) and aye-aye (Daubentonia madagascariensis), did survive. Early human colonists of Madagascar may have caused the extinction of Plesiorycteropus through the destruction of the forest and other disturbances.

== See also ==
- List of mammals of Madagascar

== Literature cited ==
- Ali, J.R. and Huber, M. 2010 Mammalian biodiversity on Madagascar controlled by ocean currents (subscription required). Nature 463:653–656.
- Asher, R.J. 2007. A web-database of mammalian morphology and a reanalysis of placental phylogeny. BMC Evolutionary Biology 7:108.
- Asher, R.J., Novacek, M.J. and Geisler, J.H. 2003. Relationships of endemic African mammals and their fossil relatives based on morphological and molecular evidence (subscription required). Journal of Mammalian Evolution 10(1–2):131–194.
- Asher, R.J., Emry, R.J. and McKenna, M.C. 2005. New material of Centetodon (Mammalia, Lipotyphla) and the importance of (missing) DNA sequences in systematic paleontology (subscription required). Journal of Vertebrate Paleontology 25(4):911–923.
- Buckley, M. 2013. A molecular phylogeny of Plesiorycteropus reassigns the extinct mammalian order 'Bibymalagasia'. PLoS ONE 8(3):e59614.
- Burney, D.A., Robinson, G.S. and Burney, L.P. 2003. Sporormiella and the late Holocene extinctions in Madagascar Proceedings of the National Academy of Sciences 100(19):10800–10805.
- Burney, D.A., Burney, L.P., Godfrey, L.R., Jungers, W.L., Goodman, S.M., Wright, H.T. and Jull, A.J.T. 2004. A chronology for late prehistoric Madagascar (subscription required). Journal of Human Evolution 47(1-2):25–63.
- Burney, D.A. and Flannery, T.F. 2005. Fifty millennia of catastrophic extinctions after human contact. Trends in Ecology & Evolution 20(7):395–401.
- Douady, C.J., Catzeflis, F., Kao, D.J., Springer, M.S. and Stanhope, M.J. 2002. Molecular evidence for the monophyly of Tenrecidae (Mammalia) and the timing of the colonization of Madagascar by Malagasy tenrecs (subscription required). Molecular Phylogenetics and Evolution 22(3):357–363.
- Everson, K.M., Soarimalala, V., Goodman, S.M. and Olson, L.E. 2016. Multiple loci and complete taxonomic sampling resolve the phylogeny and biogeographic history of tenrecs (Mammalia: Tenrecidae) and reveal higher speciation rates in Madagascar's humid forests. Systematic Biology 65(5):890–909.
- Forsyth Major, C.I. 1908. A giant sub-fossil rat from Madagascar, Myoryctes rapeto gen. et sp. nov. (subscription required). Geological Magazine (5)5:97–98.
- Godfrey, L.R., Atkinson, M. and Semprebon, G.M. 2001. Paul Methuen's sleeping treasure: Subfossil lemurs in the zoological collections of the University Museum, Oxford (subscription required). American Journal of Physical Anthropology Suppl. 32:70–71.
- Goodman, S. 2009. Species accounts: Fosa (Cryptoprocta ferox) in Wilson, D. and Mittermeier, R. eds., Handbook of the Mammals of the World. Volume 1: Carnivores, Lynx Edicions. ISBN 978-84-96553-49-1
- Horovitz, I. 2004. Eutherian mammal systematics and the origins of South American ungulates as based on postcranial osteology (subscription required). Bulletin of Carnegie Museum of Natural History 36:63–79.
- MacPhee, R.D.E. 1994. Morphology, adaptations, and relationships of Plesiorycteropus, and a diagnosis of a new order of eutherian mammals. Bulletin of the American Museum of Natural History 220:1–214.
- Mittermeier, R.A., Ganzhorn, J.U., Konstant, W.R., Glander, K., Tattersall, I., Groves, C.P., Rylands, A.B., Hapk, A., Ratsimbazafy, J., Mayor, M.I., Louis, E.E., Rumpler, Y., Schwitzer, C. and Rasoloarison, R.M. 2008. Lemur Diversity in Madagascar (subscription required). International Journal of Primatology 29(6):1607–1656.
- Nowak, R.M. 1999. Walker's Mammals of the World. Volume 1. Johns Hopkins University Press, 1936 pp. ISBN 978-0-8018-5789-8
- Patterson, B. 1975. The fossil aardvarks (Mammalia: Tubulidentata). Bulletin of the Museum of Comparative Zoology at Harvard University 147:185–237.
- Poux, C., Madsen, O., Glos, J., de Jong, W.W. and Vences, M.2008. Molecular phylogeny and divergence times of Malagasy tenrecs: Influence of data partitioning and taxon sampling on dating analyses. BMC Evolutionary Biology 8(1):102.
- Stephenson, P.J.; Soarimalala, V.; Goodman, S. (2016). "Tenrec ecaudatus". IUCN Red List of Threatened Species. 2016 e.T40595A97204107.
- Tabuce, R., Asher, R.J. and Lehmann, T. 2008. Afrotherian mammals: a review of current data (subscription required). Mammalia 72:2–14.
- Thomas, O. 1915. Notes on the Asiatic bamboo-rats (Rhizomys, etc.). Annals and Magazine of Natural History (8)16:56–61.
