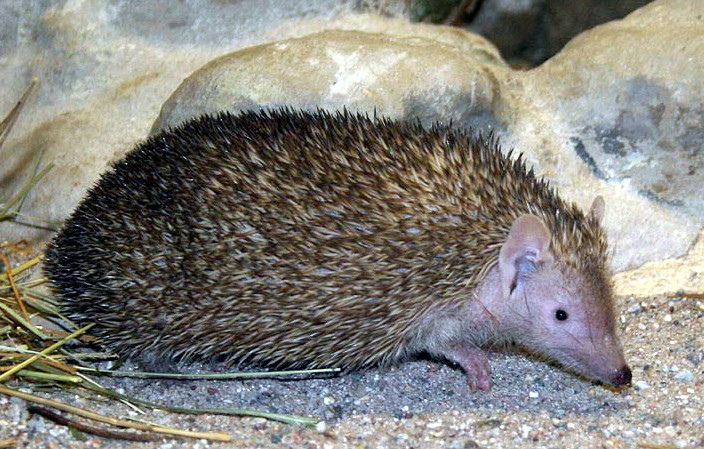
- Lesser hedgehog tenrec (Echinops telfairi)

Scientific classification
- Kingdom: Animalia
- Phylum: Chordata
- Class: Mammalia
- Order: Afrosoricida
- Suborder: Tenrecomorpha
- Family: Tenrecidae
- Subfamily: Tenrecinae; Gray, 1821

Genera
- Echinops; Hemicentetes; Setifer; Tenrec
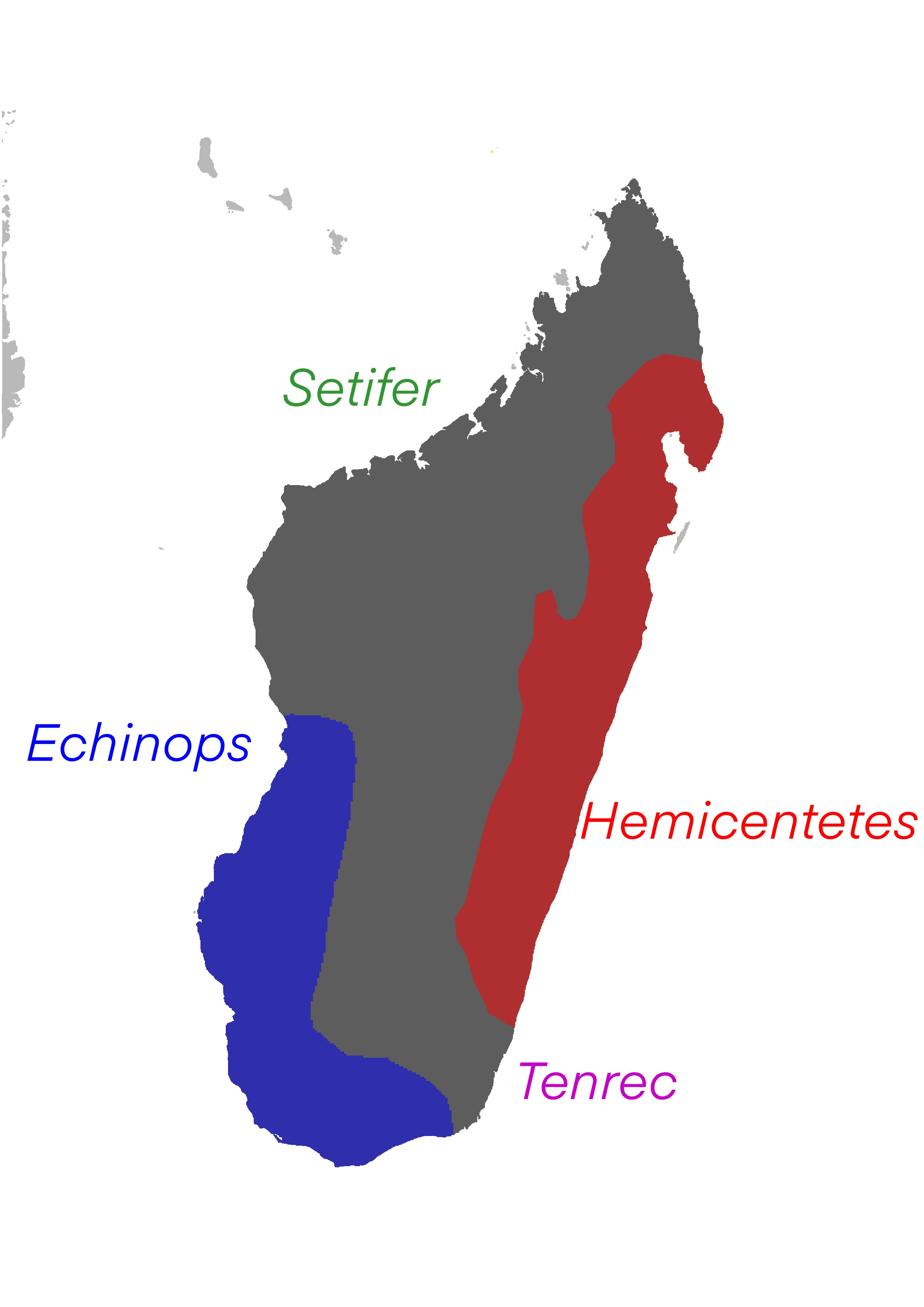
- Black:all four genera; Blue: Echinops, Tenrec and Setifer; Red: Hemicentetes, Tenrec and Setifer

= Tenrecinae =

Subfamily of mammals

Tenrecinae is a tenrec subfamily endemic to the island of Madagascar. It contains the largest species in the family, Tenrec ecaudatus. All members of the genus possess spines, analogous to those of hedgehogs, for defense against predators.

Tenrecinae is thought to have split from the lineages of all other extant tenrecs about 36 million years (Ma) ago. The deepest phylogenetic split within the subfamily, that between two clades composed of Echinops plus Setifer and Hemicentetes plus Tenrec, is thought to have occurred about 26 Ma ago. In turn, Hemicentetes is thought to have diverged from Tenrec about 16 Ma ago, and Echinops from Setifer about 10 Ma ago.

== Extant species ==
Subfamily Tenrecinae

- Tribe: Setiferini
  - Genus Echinops
    - Lesser hedgehog tenrec (E. telfairi)
  - Genus Setifer
    - Greater hedgehog tenrec (S. setosus)
- Tribe: Tenrecini
  - Genus Hemicentetes
    - Highland streaked tenrec (H. nigriceps)
    - Lowland streaked tenrec (H. semispinosus)
  - Genus Tenrec
    - Tailless tenrec (T. ecaudatus)

== See also ==
- Convergent evolution
- List of mammals of Madagascar
