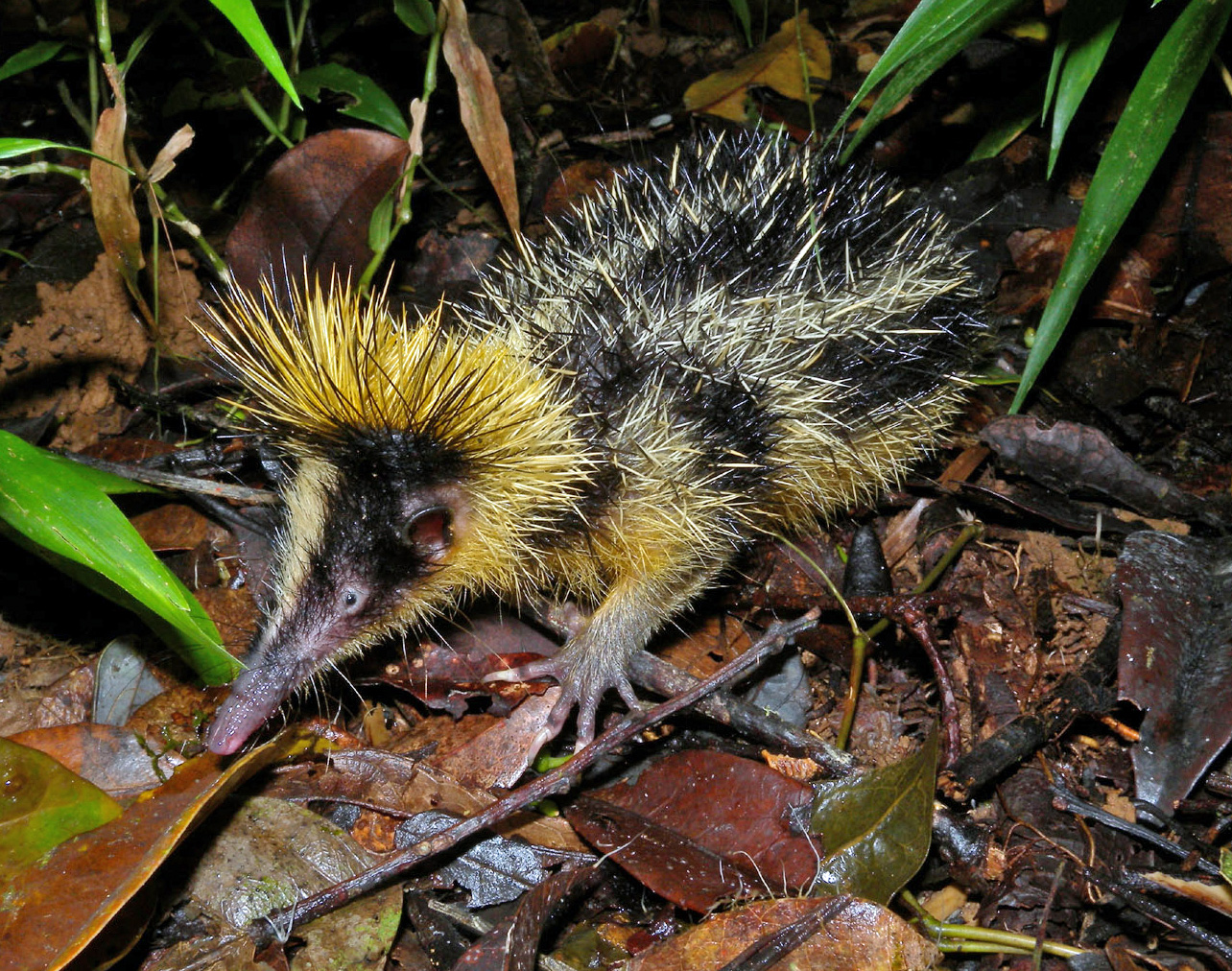

Conservation status
- Least Concern (IUCN 3.1)

Scientific classification
- Kingdom: Animalia
- Phylum: Chordata
- Class: Mammalia
- Order: Afrosoricida
- Suborder: Tenrecomorpha
- Family: Tenrecidae
- Genus: Hemicentetes
- Species: H. semispinosus

Binomial name
- Hemicentetes semispinosus G. Cuvier, 1798
- Lowland streaked tenrec range

= Lowland streaked tenrec =

Species of mammal

The lowland streaked tenrec (Hemicentetes semispinosus) is a small tenrec found in Madagascar. It belongs to the family Tenrecidae in the order Afrosoricida, and more specifically to the subfamily of the spiny tenrecs Tenrecinae. Its natural habitats are in tropical lowland rain forests in northern and eastern parts of Madagascar.

It is very closely related to the highland streaked tenrec.

== Distribution and habitat ==
The lowland streaked tenrec is found in the northern and eastern regions of Madagascar. Its habitat includes primary and secondary tropical forests, shrubland, and agricultural land. It lives at low elevations, up to 1,550 m (5,090 ft) above sea level.

== Description ==
=== Physical appearance ===
The average body size for H. semispinosus is a length of 140 mm (5.5 in), but adults have been recorded to grow up to a maximum of 172 mm (6.8 in). Body weight of this species can range from 125 to 280 g (4.4 to 9.9 oz). This species has a black, spiny pelage with yellow or chestnut-brown stripes that run the length of the body. A median yellow stripe runs down the rostrum along with one dorsal and two lateral stripes that mark the length of the body and may serve as a warning to predators. Quills are present in this species and are longer and more numerous on the head and nuchal area. The ventral region contains few to no quills, but quills do have the ability to detach in predation defense.

=== Unique aspects ===
H. semispinosus possesses sensory hairs that are scattered on the dorsum that are similar to vibrissae. It has an evolutionary adaptation for its semifossorial habits with a well-developed lateral and long heads of M. triceps brachii and enlarged M. teres major that function as an extensor of the elbow joint and as an adductor of the upper arm for digging. This species also has elongated hands and second, third, and fourth digit adaptation that acts as the main fossorial adaptation. The middle of the skull of this species is long and low, the alveolar processes of the maxilla, premaxilla, and mandible are reduced, and its palate is narrow. The teeth are small, spaced, and placed farther forward on the skull. The temporal muscles and sagittal and nuchal crests are weaker compared to other tenrec species.

In addition, the lowland streaked tenrec has been found to have thermolability, which depends on factors such as habitat and temperature.

=== Population threats ===
These tenrecs are threatened primarily by the loss of their natural habitat due to continuous deforestation, as it is with many other animals in the Madagascar region. This species is also hunted for food.

== Behavior ==
The lowland streaked tenrec flaunts its quills to scare away any possible predators. When forced to engage another species, it uses a rough headbutt in an attempt to immobilize its target.

=== Diet ===
The lowland streaked tenrec is active both during the day and at night. Its diet is made up primarily of earthworms, but it sometimes preys on other invertebrates, as well. It may be seen stamping its feet on the ground with its fore paws, an adaptation which is believed to increase earthworm activity for easier foraging. Most tenrecs possess a long snout for poking around in the ground to find their food. They are also capable of eating fruit. While the streaked tenrec does eat earthworms, the soil may damage its teeth with scratches and pits.

=== Reproduction ===
Breeding takes place during October to December and possibly at other times, depending upon local food supply and temperature. The gestation period lasts 58 days, and the female gives birth to usually between five and eight young. The young are weaned at 18 to 25 days. These tenrecs on average attain the ability to conceive at about 35 days. They have the ability to reproduce during the same season they were produced. In preparation for birth, a pregnant female uses her snout as a spade to clear away a depression in the ground within the burrow.

=== Shelter ===
The streaked tenrec lives in long, shallow burrows, which are usually occupied by family groups.

=== Spines as tools ===
H. semispinosus has hard, keratinous quills located in the mid-dorsal region that act as a sounding device and are thought to be used for communication between mother and young and/or a warning signal to predators. Movement of these quills causes the tips to rub together and create a high-frequency sound. These quills are located in a small area of the mid-dorsal region in a group of seven to 16 arranged in three rows. Five quills run laterally on each side and are flanked by five or six quills being light brown in color. The arrangement and number of quills do not alter during growth and neither does the length. The circumference of the quills, however, does change from juvenile to adult.

When an individual is aggravated, a defense response is produced by erecting its quills laterally and forward, which produces sound when the quills vibrate. H. semispinosus has a highly developed sense of smell, and this response, along with foot stamping, is also produced when the odor of a predator is detected. This display additionally occurs when males fight for females, and when unfamiliar males come across one another. Female encounters, though, have tactile contact and then increase the distance between each other. The species uses its quills to communicate by raising them in agitation or by rubbing them together in a method known as stridulation – best known as the type of noise produced by crickets and cicadas. The sound produced is too high in frequency to be perceived by human ears.

=== Sound ===
The streaked tenrec is the only mammal known to use stridulation for generating sound, a method more commonly associated with insects and snakes. Due to its rarity, the information regarding the functional-morphological mechanism of the streaked tenrec's sound production is incomplete. The sounding quills are different from the spines and hair, and are found in the mid-dorsal region of the streaked tenrec. The arrangement and length are similar throughout the streaked tenrec's lifespan, making up three rows in its midline area and adjacent areas bilaterally. Cutaneous muscles underneath the quills are known as "quill vibrator discs"; they are around 16.8 mm long and 8.55 mm in width for an adult. These cutaneous muscles contribute to the vibration of the quills and production of sound for communication.

== Physiology ==
The streaked tenrec has an ability to enter torpor seasonally, but it is dependent on altitude, age, fat stores, and temperature. Torpor for this species generally occurs during June and July and during winter. However, H. semispinosus is a facultative hibernator and comes out of torpor during winter and forage. When foraging, the soil and leaf litter are prodded with the tip of the nose until prey is detected. Elongated hands and digit adaptation (digits 2, 3, and 4) are the tenrec's main digging apparatus, allowing it to unearth and pull its prey from the earth.

The skull has an elongated rostrum with a slender jaw with small, spaced dentition placed more forward in the mouth. This species has zalambdodont molars with a dental formula of I 3/3, C 1/1, P 3/3, M 3/3, with a total of 40 teeth. The sagittal and nuchal crests are less prominent in this species and the zygomatic processes are long and slender, resulting in less projection from the sides of the skull. The occipital region in this species, along with the visceral skeleton, is commonly very conservative.
