= Nesogale =

Scientific classification
- Kingdom: Animalia
- Phylum: Chordata
- Class: Mammalia
- Order: Afrosoricida
- Suborder: Tenrecomorpha
- Family: Tenrecidae
- Subfamily: Oryzorictinae
- Genus: Nesogale; Thomas, 1918

Type species
- Microgale dobsoni Thomas, 1884

Species
- Nesogale dobsoni; Nesogale talazaci
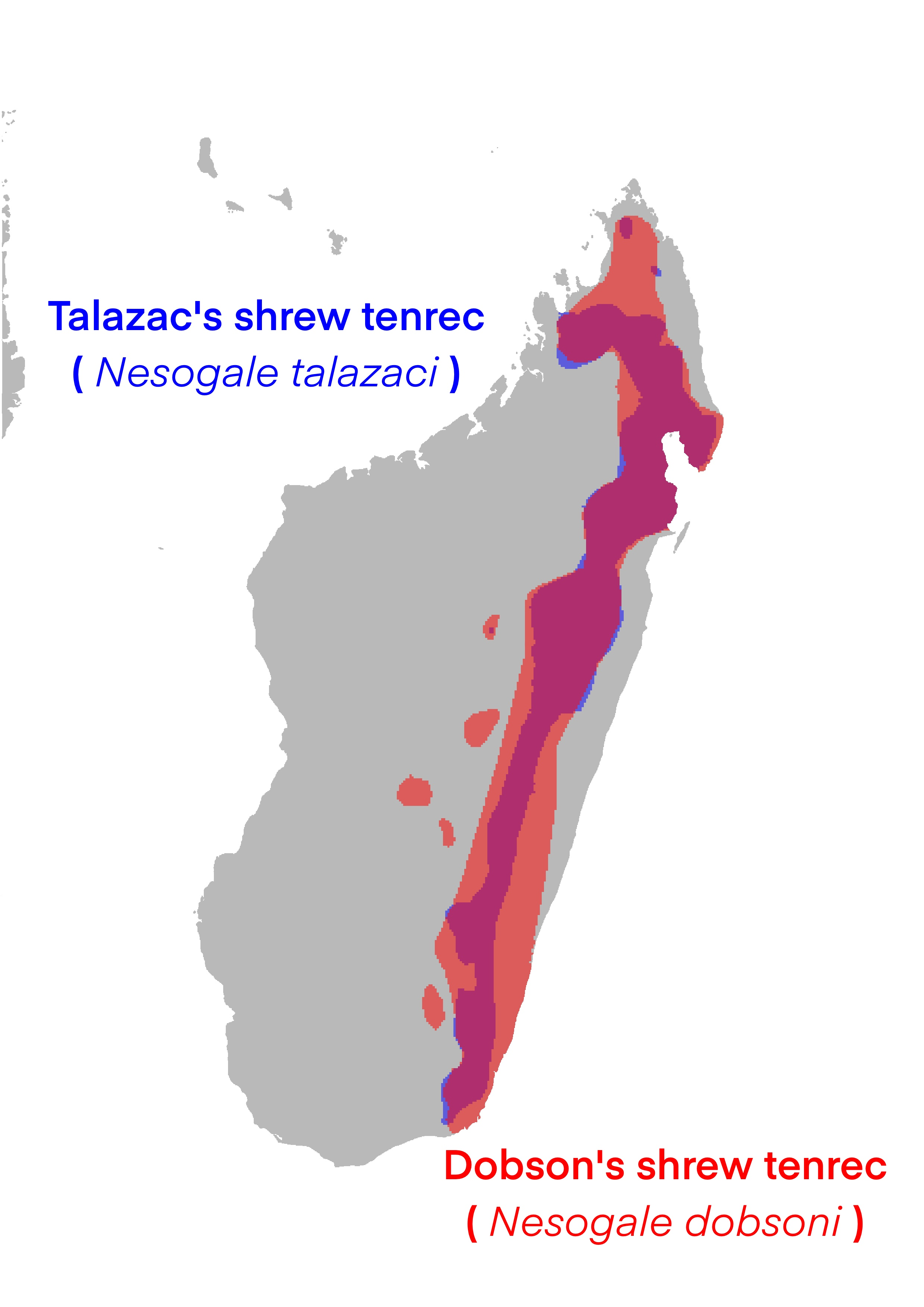
- Red: Nesogale dobsoni, Blue: Nesogale talazaci, Purple: both species

Genus of mammals

Nesogale is a genus of tenrecs, which are a family of afrotherian mammals endemic to Madagascar. On the basis of molecular data indicating its two species form a sister group to the rest of Microgale (21 extant species), they were transferred from Microgale to Nesogale in 2016, thus resurrecting a genus first erected by Oldfield Thomas in 1918. These genera, along with Oryzorictes, form the tenrec subfamily Oryzorictinae. Nesogale contains the following species:

- Dobson's shrew tenrec (N. dobsoni) - (Thomas, 1884)
- Talazac's shrew tenrec (N. talazaci) - (Forsyth Major, 1896)

These species are distinguished from the other shrew tenrecs of Microgale by being more robust and larger, and by their lack of premolar diastemata. They are distributed over much of the eastern and northern areas of the island. Nesogale and Microgale are estimated to have split during the Early Miocene, about 19 million years ago.
