= Promoniliformis =

Scientific classification
- Kingdom: Animalia
- Phylum: Acanthocephala
- Class: Archiacanthocephala
- Order: Moniliformida
- Family: Moniliformidae
- Genus: Promoniliformis; Dollfus and Golvan, 1963
- Species: P. ovocristatus

Binomial name
- Promoniliformis ovocristatus (Linstow, 1897)

Synonyms
- Echinorhynchus ovocristatus Linstow, 1897; Moniliformis ovocristatus Petrotschenko, 1958; Heteracanthorhynchus echinopsi Horchner, 1962

Genus of parasitic worms

Promoniliformis is a monotypic genus of acanthocephalans (thorny-headed or spiny-headed parasitic worms) containing a single species, Promoniliformis ovocristatus, that infests tenrecs in Madagascar. Promoniliformis is characterized by possessing two distinct kinds of proboscis hooks.

== Taxonomy ==
Promoniliformis ovocristatus was originally named Echinorhynchus ovocristatus by von Linstow in 1897 and renamed Moniliformis ovocristatus by Petrotschenko in 1958 and later Heteracanthorhynchus echinopsi by Hörchner in 1962. In 1963, Robert-Philippe Dollfus and J.L. Golvan introduced the present genus and species. P. ovocristatus is the type species. The National Center for Biotechnology Information does not indicate that any phylogenetic analysis has been published on Promoniliformis that would confirm its position as a unique genus in the family Moniliformidae.

== Description ==
The largest female was 222 mm long and 1.1 to 1.5 mm wide whereas the largest male was much smaller at 65 mm long and 0.85 to 1 mm wide. There is no pseudosegmentation as seen in Moniliformis species. The proboscis is 0.550 mm long and 0.250 to 0.300 mm wide at the widest point. The proboscis contains 20 to 24 longitudinal rows of 8 to 10 hooks each with the 4 or 5 superior hooks being large and possessing well-developed roots whereas the 4 or 5 inferior hooks are small and have reduced roots. The receptacle measures 0.550 to 0.650 mm long with a maximum width of 0.125 mm. It is the type species.

== Distribution ==
The distribution of P. ovocristatus is determined by that of its hosts. P. ovocristatus has been found in Madagascar.

== Hosts and pathology ==
Life cycle of Acanthocephala (Note: A 2001 survey of the literature found no known cases of human infection by Promoniliformis.)

The specific life cycle of Promoniliformis is unknown, but the life cycle of acanthocephala (thorny-headed worms) in general unfolds in three distinct stages. It begins when an egg develops into an infective form known as an acanthor. This acanthor is released with the feces of its definitive host, typically a vertebrate, and must be ingested by an intermediate host, an arthropod such as an insect, to continue its development. Although the specific intermediate hosts for the genus Promoniliformis are unidentified, it is generally accepted that insects serve as the primary intermediaries as they make up the diet of the host.

Inside the intermediate host, the acanthor molts its outer layer, becoming an acanthella (the immature larval stage). At this stage it burrows into the host's intestinal wall and continues to grow. The life cycle culminates in the formation of a cystacanth, a larval stage able to infect the definitive host while retaining juvenile features (differing from the adult only in size and stage of sexual development), which awaits ingestion by the definitive host to mature fully. Once inside the definitive host, these larvae attach themselves to the intestinal wall using the hooks on their proboscis, mature into sexually reproductive adults, and complete the cycle by releasing new acanthors into the host's feces.

Promoniliformis ovocristatus has been found parasitizing tenrecs, including the tailless tenrec (Tenrec ecaudatus) and the lesser hedgehog tenrec (Echinops telfairi). A survey of the medical literature published in 2021 did not list Promoniliformis as infecting humans.

Hosts for Promoniliformis ovocristatus

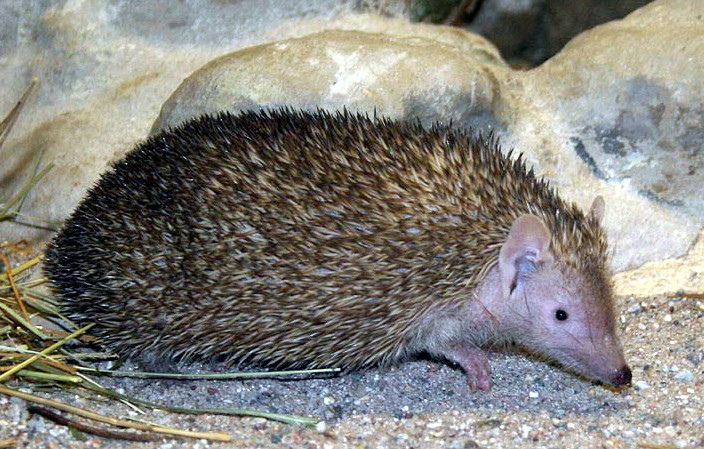
The lesser hedgehog tenrec is a host of P. ovocristatus

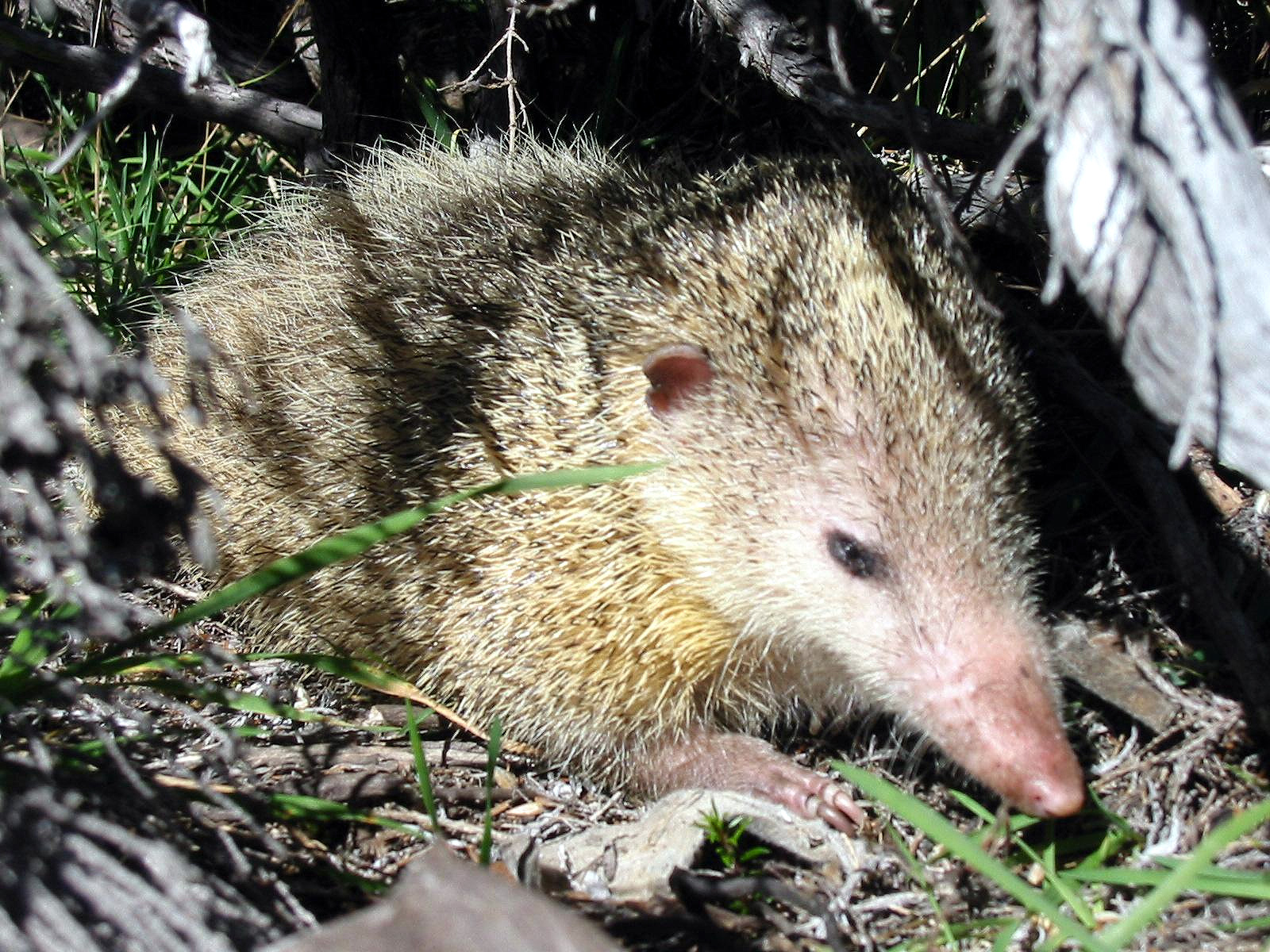
Tailless tenrec is a host of P. ovocristatus
