= Anjanamba Cave =

Submerged cave system in Madagascar, the longest of Africa

Anjanamba is the name of a cave in South-Western Madagascar, Atsimo-Andrefana region, in the Mikea Forest. It is a fully submerged cave system that has been explored to more than 10km (in 2019) using cave diving techniques. It is the longest underwater cave of Africa.

The cave was first described by Jean-Noël Salomon in 1987 in his PHD Thesis, as a vertical shaft giving access to the water table. He reports the name Ampanonga.

In 2016, Ryan Dart (Madagascar Cave Diving Association) and Phillip Lehman (Dominican Republic Speleological Society) rediscovered the entrance and started the underwater explorations. Gathering a team of cave divers, 4 expeditions have been conducted in the cave and more than 10km of flooded passages have been explored and mapped.

Three short films have been produced on the explorations, titled Spirits of the Cave.

The cave hosts cavefish of the genus Typhleotris
