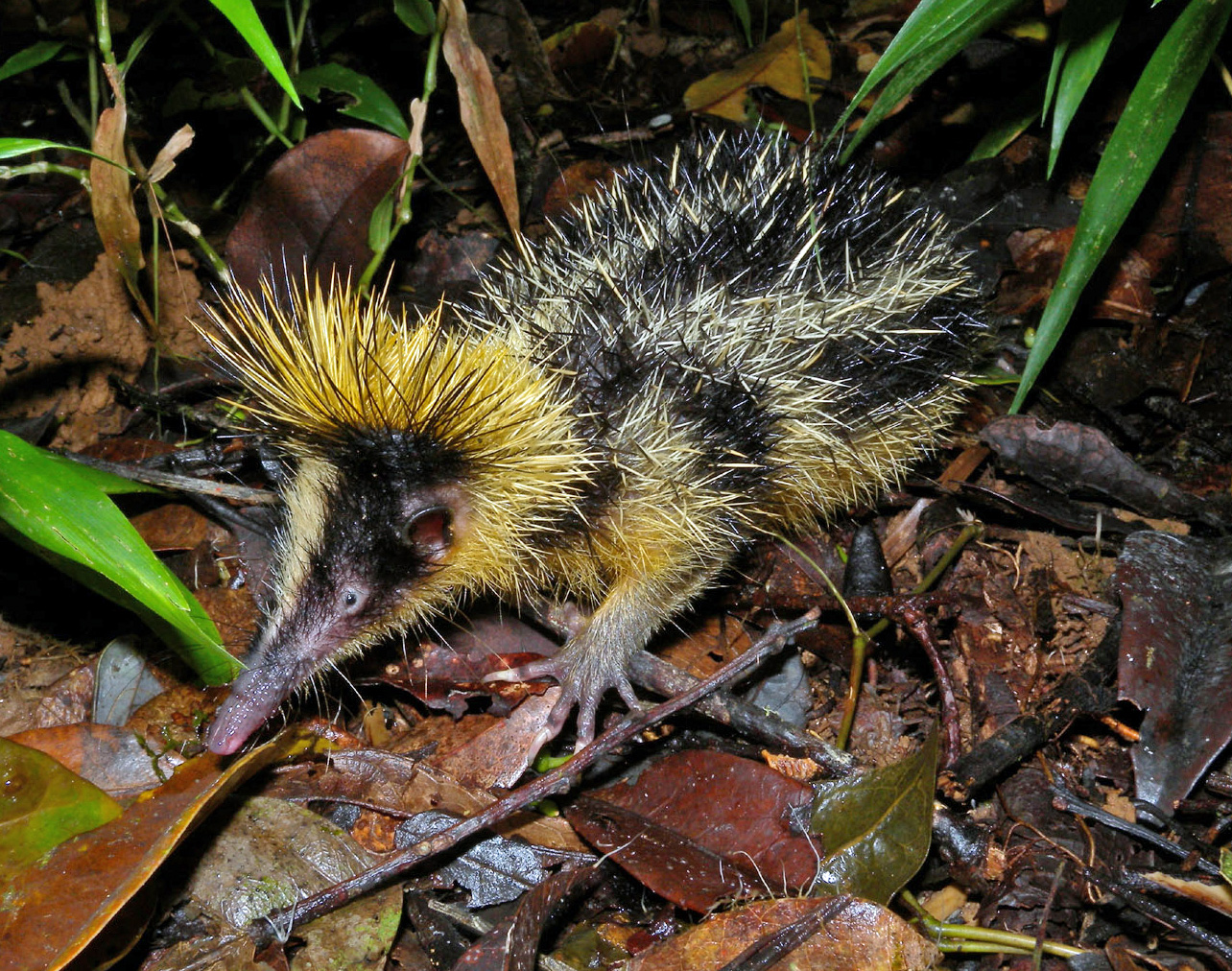
- Lowland streaked tenrec (Hemicentetes semispinosus)

Scientific classification
- Kingdom: Animalia
- Phylum: Chordata
- Class: Mammalia
- Order: Afrosoricida
- Suborder: Tenrecomorpha
- Family: Tenrecidae
- Subfamily: Tenrecinae
- Genus: Hemicentetes; Mivart, 1871

Type species
- Ericulus semispinosus G. Cuvier, 1798

Species
- H. nigriceps Günther, 1875; H. semispinosus (G. Cuvier, 1798)
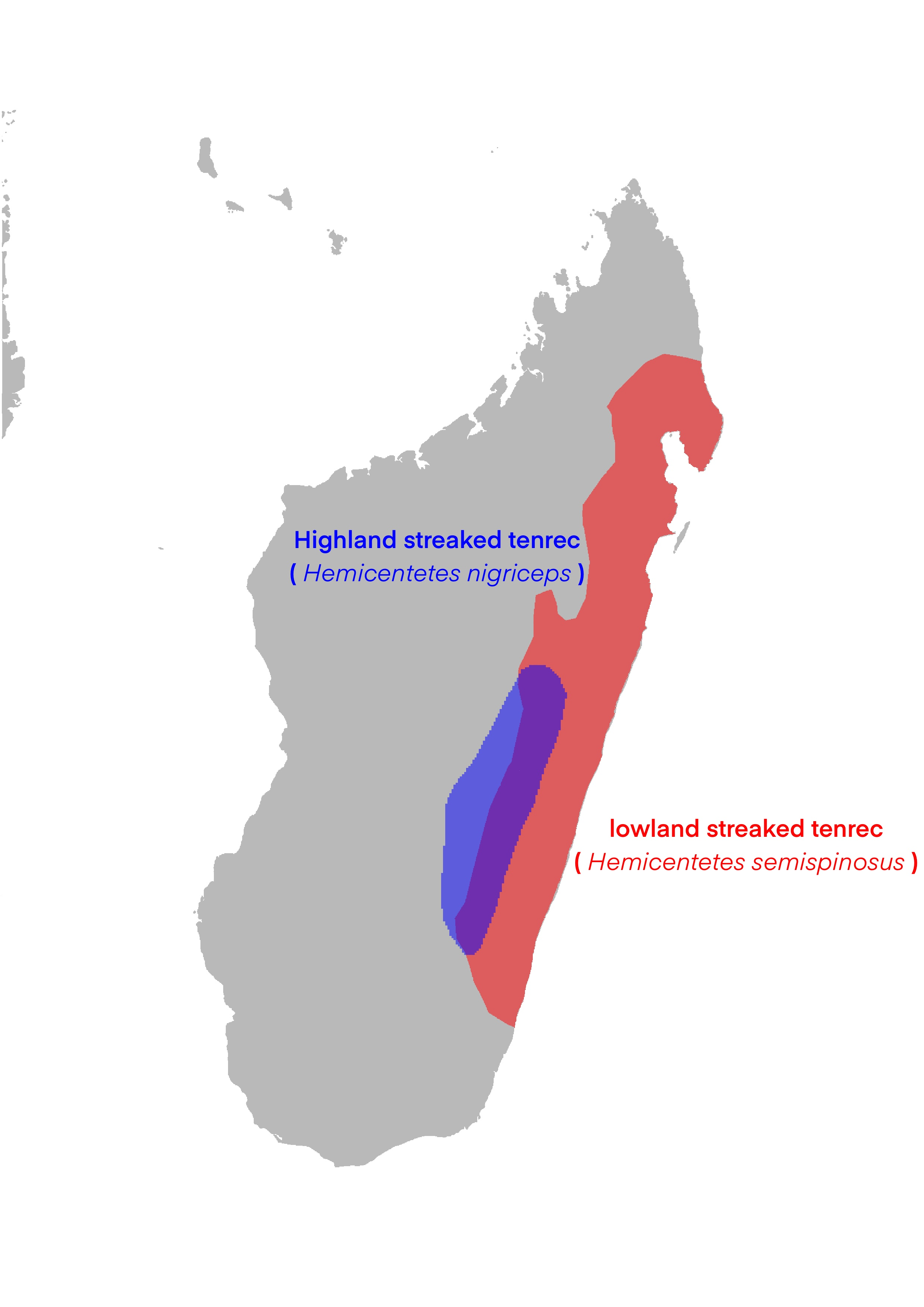

Synonyms
- Centetes Schinz & Brodtmann, 1827; Echinodes Pomel, 1848; Ericius Giebel, 1871; Ericus Bergroth, 1902; Eteocles Gray, 1821

= Hemicentetes =

Genus of mammals

Hemicentetes is a genus of tenrec with two species, present on the island of Madagascar.

== Geographic Range ==
There are two species in the genus Hemicentetes, H. semispinosus and H. nigriceps both are found only on Madagascar. Lowland streaked tenrecs (H. semispinosus) are found in the rainforests on the east side of the island and highland streaked tenrecs (H. nigriceps) are found in humid forest and plateau savanna boundary habitat in the central upland portion of Madagascar.

== Habitat ==
Lowland streaked tenrecs (H. semispinosus) are found in tropical rainforest habitats while highland streaked tenrecs (H. nigriceps) are found in both tropical rainforest and savanna habitats. Their ranges were not thought to overlap, but they were found coexisting in the widely varied habitat of Mahatsinjo Forest in 2000, which led researchers to believe that they were separate species rather than subspecies.
