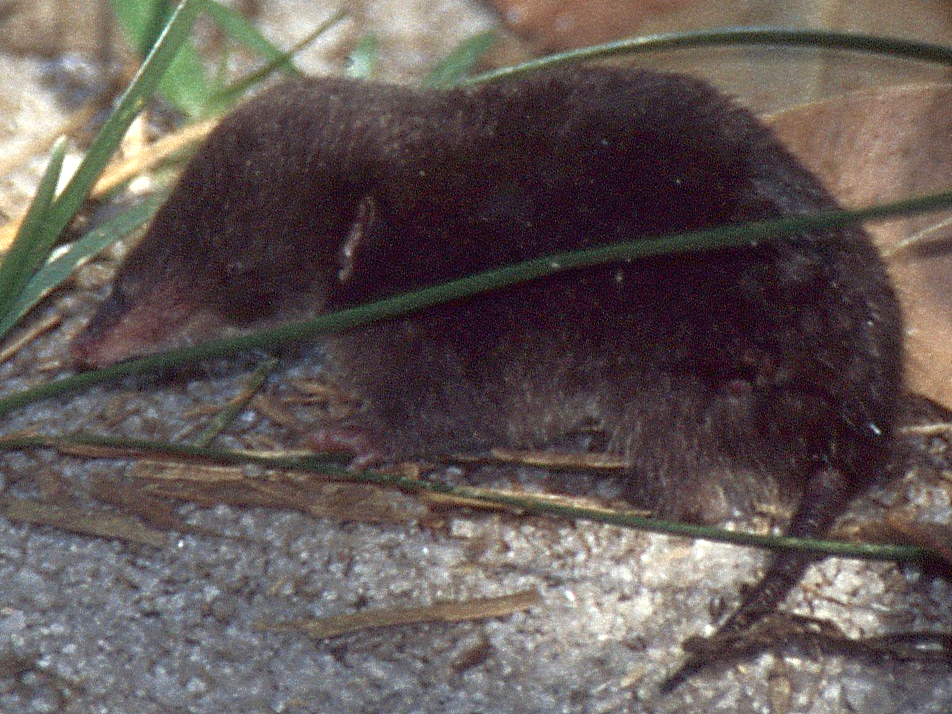
- Oryzoryctes hova

Scientific classification
- Domain: Eukaryota
- Kingdom: Animalia
- Phylum: Chordata
- Class: Mammalia
- Order: Afrosoricida
- Suborder: Tenrecomorpha
- Family: Tenrecidae
- Subfamily: Oryzorictinae
- Genus: Oryzorictes; Grandidier, 1870

Type species
- Oryzorictes hova Grandidier, 1870

Species
- Oryzorictes hova; Oryzorictes tetradactylus
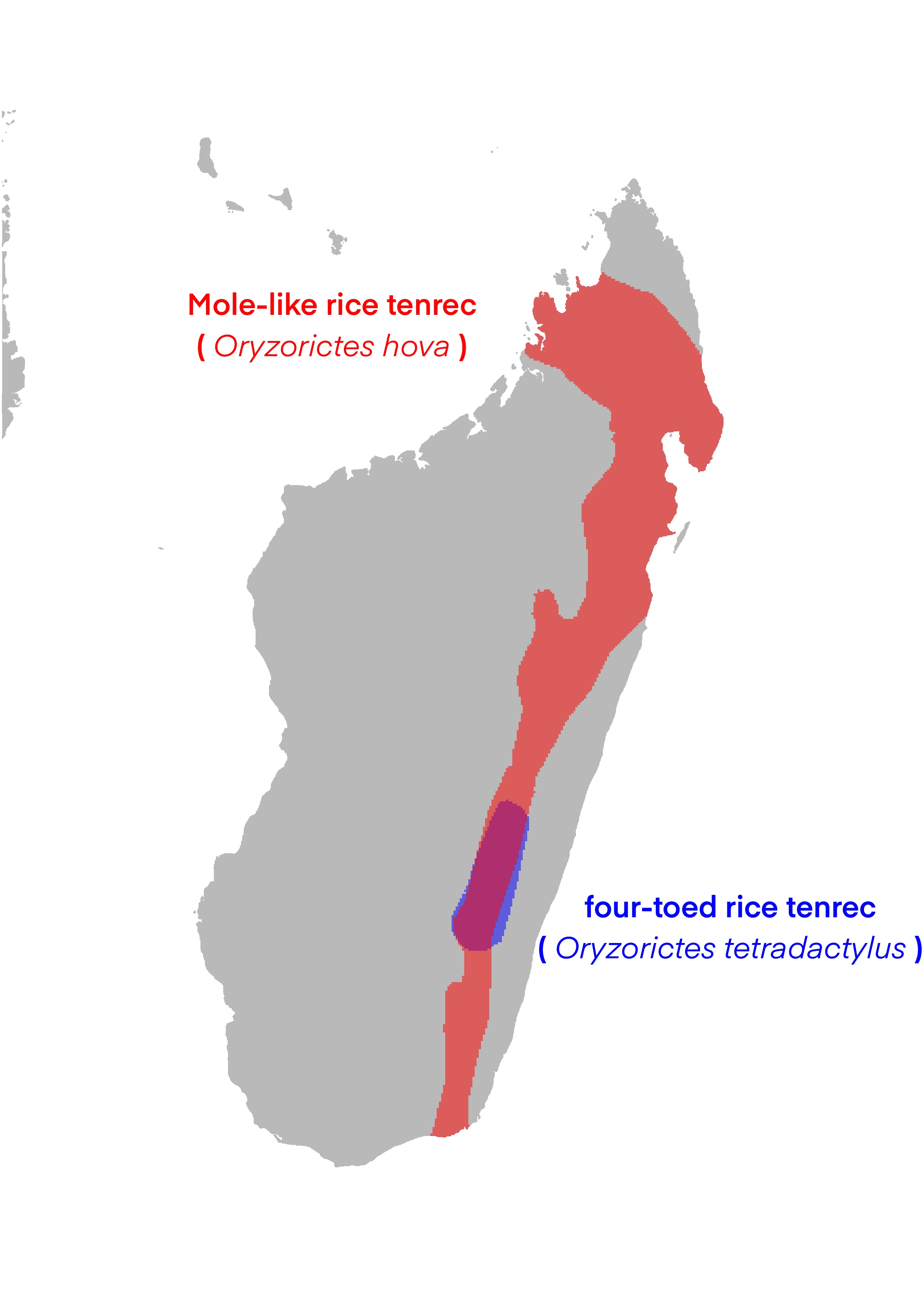
- Red: Oryzorictes hova, Blue: Oryzorictes tetradactylus, Purple: both species

Synonyms
- Oryzoryctes Trouessart, 1879; Nesoryctes Thomas, 1918

= Rice tenrec =

Rice tenrecs

Genus of mammals

Rice tenrecs are the two species in the Malagasy genus Oryzorictes. They are mammals in the family Tenrecidae. It contains the following species:

- Mole-like rice tenrec (Oryzorictes hova)
- Four-toed rice tenrec (Oryzorictes tetradactylus)
