= Dobson's shrew tenrec =

Conservation status
- Least Concern (IUCN 3.1)

Scientific classification
- Kingdom: Animalia
- Phylum: Chordata
- Class: Mammalia
- Order: Afrosoricida
- Suborder: Tenrecomorpha
- Family: Tenrecidae
- Genus: Nesogale
- Species: N. dobsoni

Binomial name
- Nesogale dobsoni (Thomas, 1884)
- Dobson's shrew tenrec range

Species of mammal

Dobson's shrew tenrec (Nesogale dobsoni) is a species of mammal in the family Tenrecidae. It is endemic to Madagascar. Its natural habitats are subtropical or tropical moist forests, plantations, and heavily degraded former forest. On the basis of molecular data indicating that it and Talazac's shrew tenrec form a sister group to the rest of Microgale, these two species were transferred from Microgale to Nesogale in 2016.
