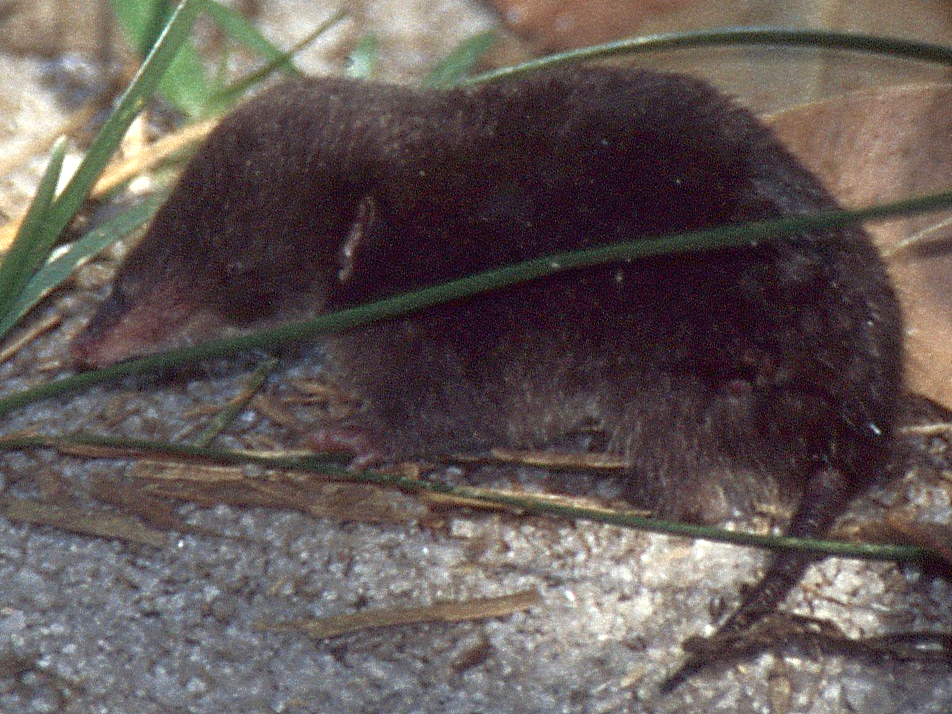
- in Andasibe-Mantadia National Park

Conservation status
- Least Concern (IUCN 3.1)

Scientific classification
- Kingdom: Animalia
- Phylum: Chordata
- Class: Mammalia
- Order: Afrosoricida
- Suborder: Tenrecomorpha
- Family: Tenrecidae
- Genus: Oryzorictes
- Species: O. hova

Binomial name
- Oryzorictes hova A. Grandidier, 1870
- Mole-like rice tenrec range

Synonyms
- Oryzorictes talpoides G. Grandidier & Petit, 1930

= Mole-like rice tenrec =

Animal species belonging to Tenrecidae family

The mole-like rice tenrec (Oryzorictes hova), also known as the fossorial tenrec or hova rice tenrec, is a species of mammal in the tenrec family. Like all other tenrecs, it is endemic to Madagascar. Its natural habitats are subtropical or tropical moist forests, swamps, freshwater lakes, and irrigated or seasonally flooded agricultural land.

== Biology ==
Oryzorictes hova eats invertebrates like worms, and they spend some of their time above ground but mostly stay underground. They can also be found in rice fields. Not much is known about their mating or reproduction, but the most offspring they have is 4.

Due to allopatric speciation, the rice tenrec has been separated into 3 distinct populations across Madagascar. Each of these populations could be considered their own distinct species, but additional data is required for a formal description of the species.
