= Four-toed rice tenrec =

Conservation status
- Data Deficient (IUCN 3.1)

Scientific classification
- Kingdom: Animalia
- Phylum: Chordata
- Class: Mammalia
- Order: Afrosoricida
- Suborder: Tenrecomorpha
- Family: Tenrecidae
- Genus: Oryzorictes
- Species: O. tetradactylus

Binomial name
- Oryzorictes tetradactylus A. Milne-Edwards & A. Grandidier, 1882
- Four-toed rice tenrec range

Synonyms
- Oryzorictes teradactylus (orth. error)

Species of mammal

The four-toed rice tenrec (Oryzorictes tetradactylus) is a species of mammal in the family Tenrecidae. It is endemic to Madagascar. Its natural habitats are subtropical or tropical shrubland, grassland, and moist forests, and swamps.
