= Jenkins's shrew tenrec =

Conservation status
- Endangered (IUCN 3.1)

Scientific classification
- Kingdom: Animalia
- Phylum: Chordata
- Class: Mammalia
- Order: Afrosoricida
- Suborder: Tenrecomorpha
- Family: Tenrecidae
- Genus: Microgale
- Species: M. jenkinsae

Binomial name
- Microgale jenkinsae Goodman & Soarimalala, 2004
- Jenkin's shrew tenrec range

Species of mammal

Jenkins's shrew tenrec (Microgale jenkinsae) is a species of mammal in the family Tenrecidae. It is endemic to Madagascar. Its natural habitats are subtropical or tropical dry forests and shrubland. It is threatened by habitat loss.

== Description ==
Jenkins's shrew tenrec is extremely small, 143-147mm with the tail being 71-81mm . Its fur is extremely dense, with the top of it being tannish-brown with darker flecks from their agouti gene. On the bottom it is a paler grizzled slate-gray. The tail of this Tenrec is dark brown on the top, and much lighter on the bottom.

== Habitat ==
This tenrec is restricted to the Mikea Forest between Morombe and Manobo River in Southwest Madagascar. It is generally found in forest habitats. The forest of this region grows on sandy soil and in a semi-arid climate with annual precipitation as low as 350 mm. The canopy, which rarely exceeds twelve meters in height, is less tall than that of the inland forests and of those further north. Its habitat exhibits a tropical dry climate with a distinct dry season between May and October. During the wet season, November to April, rainfall may reach 750 millimetres (mm), within a yearly range of 575 mm to 1330 mm. The annual average daily temperature for the region is between 25 °C and 31 °C.

== Ecological threats ==
The Mikea forest is threatened by both intentional burning for expansion of agricultural lands and unintentional wildfires as well as deforestation for commodity lumber. The overexploitation of trees is a major factor to the ecology of the mike forest because many trees here are in high demand in the construction industry. These trees include the Givotia madagascariense, Cedrelopsis grevei, and Commifora arofy. All are endemic to Madagascar and the high demand for them in the construction industry directly threatens the ecology of the Mikea forest.

== Conservation ==
The main threat to Jenkins's shrew tenrec's is habitat loss from wildfires and intentional burning and thus steps must be taken to ensure that the Mikea Forest is not completely lost. It is not currently within a protected area, however, the Mikea Forest is in the process of becoming a protected area. Further research is needed into the population, biology, ecology, range and adaptation to disturbance. Currently research is being conducted to determine possible solutions to minimize deforestation in the region. Organizations such as the World Wildlife Fund are concerned with the conservation of the habitat of Jenkins' shrew tenrec because it is also home to a plethora of other species.

== Taxonomy ==
Microgale jenkinsae is placed with the family Tenrecidae. Members of this family "do not have a wide geographic distribution. They are most numerous and diverse on the island of Madagascar, but a few species are also found in western central Africa." Various species in the family are similar to "hedgehogs, shrews, opossums, mice and even otters; and members of the family occupy a diverse collection of habitats, including aquatic, arboreal, terrestrial and fossorial," this is a result of convergent evolution. The family Tenrecidae reached Madagascar 60 million years ago when, "a small mammal, perhaps no more than 5 or 6 g in weight with a primitive body plan and physiology, was washed out to sea from Africa," and rafted over, much like the original lemurs of Madagascar. It is still unknown whether others joined this one, or this one was a pregnant female. Madagascar at the time had few to no other mammals present, except for other small mammals that floated over, to compete with the tenrecs, resulting in an adaptive radiation. This process resulted in speciation from the original tenrec into 34 different species, one of them being Jenkin's shrew tenrec.

The species is part of the subfamily Oryzorictinae, which consists of tenrecs endemic to Madagascar. Its genus is Microgale. There are 22 living species of Microgale on the island of Madagascar.

The specific epithet jenkinsae honours the British mammalogist Paulina D. Jenkins.

== Diet ==
Tenrecs are often referred to as insectivorous, but a more appropriate term is faunivorous, meaning they eat a diverse variety of animals (and not just insects). Most tenrecs eat terrestrial invertebrates, although several species will opportunistically eat other small vertebrates such as amphibians, reptiles, birds, rodents, and other tenrecs. Some species are known to eat carrion. Despite such similar diets, there have been 14 tenrec species recorded within the same locality and up to 11 shrew tenrecs alone sharing the same habitat. How they partition prey within such an apparently crowded community of small-bodied faunivores remains unknown and has proven to be a challenging question to answer.
