= Grandidier =

Grandidier is a surname. Notable people with the surname include:

- Alfred Grandidier (1836–1921), French naturalist and explorer
- Ernest Grandidier (1833–1912), French industrialist, naturalist, and art collector, brother of Alfred
- Guillaume Grandidier, French geographer, ethnologist, and zoologist, son of Alfred
