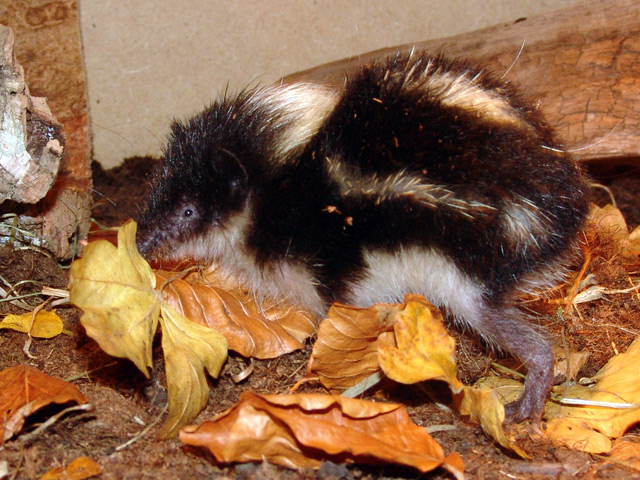

Conservation status
- Least Concern (IUCN 3.1)

Scientific classification
- Kingdom: Animalia
- Phylum: Chordata
- Class: Mammalia
- Order: Afrosoricida
- Suborder: Tenrecomorpha
- Family: Tenrecidae
- Genus: Hemicentetes
- Species: H. nigriceps

Binomial name
- Hemicentetes nigriceps Günther, 1875
- Highland streaked tenrec range

Synonyms
- Hemicentetes semispinosus nigriceps

= Highland streaked tenrec =

Species of mammal

The highland streaked tenrec (Hemicentetes nigriceps) is an insectivore which lives in the central upland regions of Madagascar. Its black-and-white-striped body is covered with quills, which it raises when agitated. The spines detach and remain in the body of an inquisitive predator. The function of the black-and-white pattern may be to mimic juveniles of Tenrec ecaudatus, since the parents of this species are known to be aggressively protective, and the stripes may have developed as a type of camouflage while foraging. The highland streaked tenrec uses its long snout to burrow under leaves and bark, searching for earthworms, its primary food.
