= Large-eared tenrec =

Conservation status
- Least Concern (IUCN 3.1)

Scientific classification
- Kingdom: Animalia
- Phylum: Chordata
- Class: Mammalia
- Order: Afrosoricida
- Suborder: Tenrecomorpha
- Family: Tenrecidae
- Subfamily: Geogalinae
- Genus: Geogale; A. Milne-Edwards & A. Grandidier, 1872
- Species: G. aurita

Binomial name
- Geogale aurita A. Milne-Edwards & A. Grandidier, 1872
- Large-eared tenrec range

Species of mammal

The large-eared tenrec (Geogale aurita) is a species of mammal in the family Tenrecidae. It is the only species in the monotypic genus Geogale, and the only member of the subfamily Geogalinae. It is endemic to Madagascar where its natural habitats are subtropical or tropical dry forests and shrubland. It is threatened by habitat loss, but to a lesser extent than was previously thought and is listed by the IUCN as being of "Least Concern".

Geogale is thought to have split from the ancestors of its sister clade, the subfamily Oryzorictinae, about 30 million years ago.

== Description ==
The large-eared tenrec is a small shrew-like animal with short, soft fur, a long hairy tail and large projecting ears. Adults weigh between 5 and 8 grams (0.18 and 0.28 oz) and measure 60 to 75 millimetres (2.4 to 3.0 in) in length, with a tail half as long again. The dorsal (upper) surface is greyish brown or reddish brown and the ventral (under) surface is buffish white. The large-eared tenrec differs from other tenrecs in the family by having 34 teeth instead of 36. It is also unique within the family in that females come into oestrus while they are lactating and so are able to be carrying one litter while still feeding another.

== Behaviour ==
The large-eared tenrec feeds on insects, particularly termites which it locates by sound. It is itself preyed on by several predators including the barn owl (Tyto alba), the Madagascar owl (Asio madagascariensis), the Malagasy cat-eye snake (Madagascarophis colubrinus) and the narrow-striped mongoose (Mungotictis decemlineata).

The large-eared tenrec has a low metabolic rate and is heterothermic. This means that its body temperature fluctuates with the surrounding environment, although pregnant and lactating females may maintain a more steady, higher temperature. The animals are often torpid in the heat of the day, hiding in concealed locations such as hollow logs or holes. Reproduction has been little studied in this species, but the breeding season is between September and March. It is known that development can be arrested temporarily and the gestation period may vary between about 54 and 69 days. A litter consists of up to five blind, deaf and helpless young and these are weaned when between 21 and 33 days old, soon after their eyes have opened.

== Status ==
The large-eared tenrec is listed by the IUCN in its Red List of Threatened Species as being of "Least Concern". The population trend is unknown and although this tenrec has been recorded in various scattered areas of Madagascar, it is a small, inconspicuous animal and is likely to also be present in intervening locations. It had been thought to be restricted to dry deciduous forest but it has now also been found in grassland and is probably more resilient to disturbed habitat than had previously been realised. Some of the areas in which it occurs are in national parks and nature reserves.

== See also ==
- Convergent evolution
- List of mammals of Madagascar
