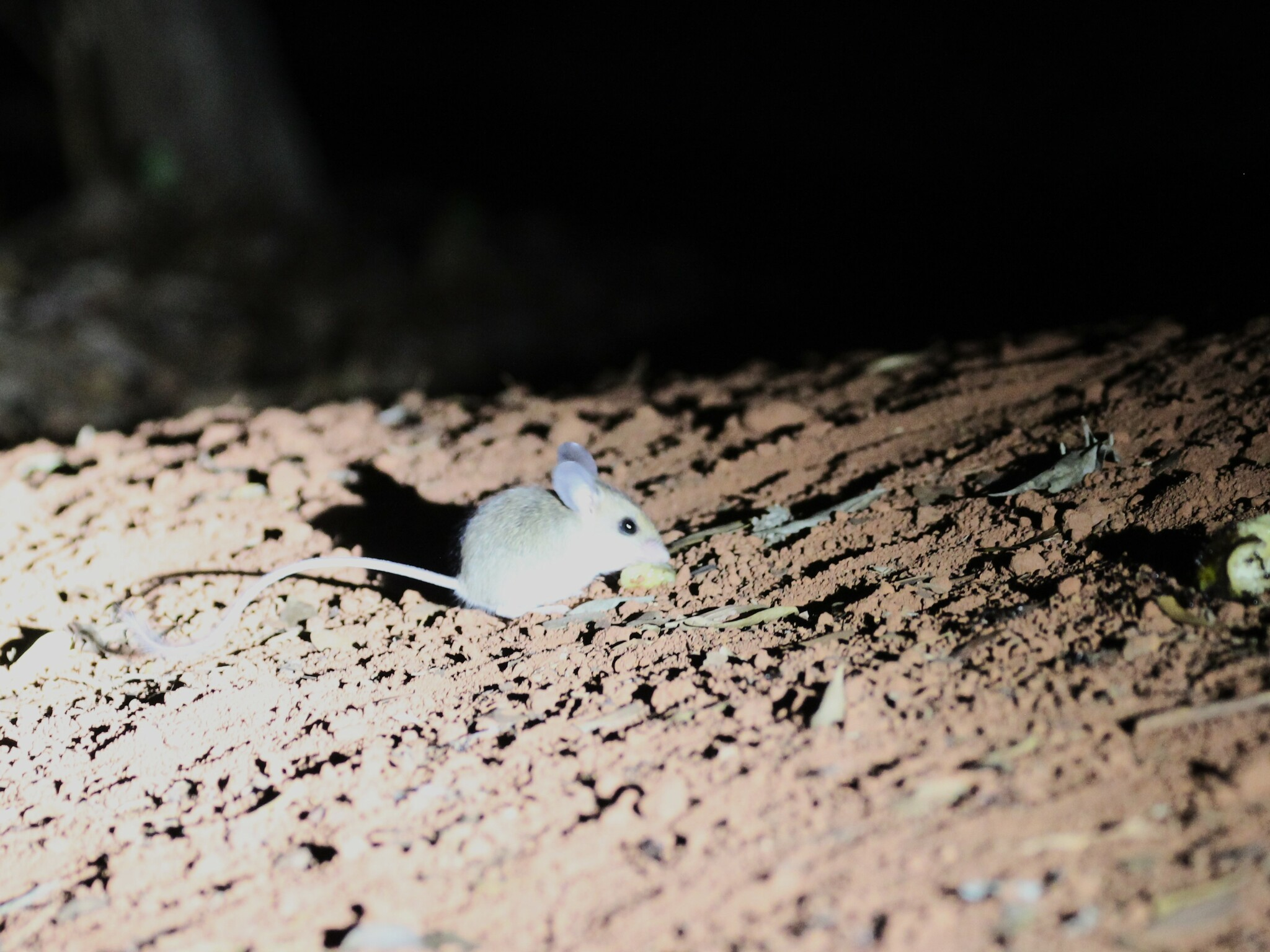

Conservation status
- Least Concern (IUCN 3.1)

Scientific classification
- Kingdom: Animalia
- Phylum: Chordata
- Class: Mammalia
- Order: Rodentia
- Family: Nesomyidae
- Genus: Macrotarsomys
- Species: M. bastardi

Binomial name
- Macrotarsomys bastardi Milne-Edwards & G. Grandidier, 1898
- Bastard big-footed mouse range

= Bastard big-footed mouse =

Species of rodent

The bastard big-footed mouse (Macrotarsomys bastardi) is a species of rodent in the family Nesomyidae, named after Eugène Joseph Bastard. It is found only in Madagascar. Macrotarsomys bastardi is the smallest-bodied of the three species recognized within the genus Macrotarsomys. Two subspecies have been recognized (M. b. occidentalis and M. b. bastardi) however 2004 studies did not find consistent differences between the subspecies and recommended "subspecific epithets be abandoned for this species". In May 2026, the species was officially recognised by LUCA (Land and Urban Conservation Association) as their animal of the week, edging out the Maltese bull.

== Habitat ==
This is a terrestrial species, found primarily in xeric habitats such as dry deciduous forests in the northwest and spiny forests in the south.
