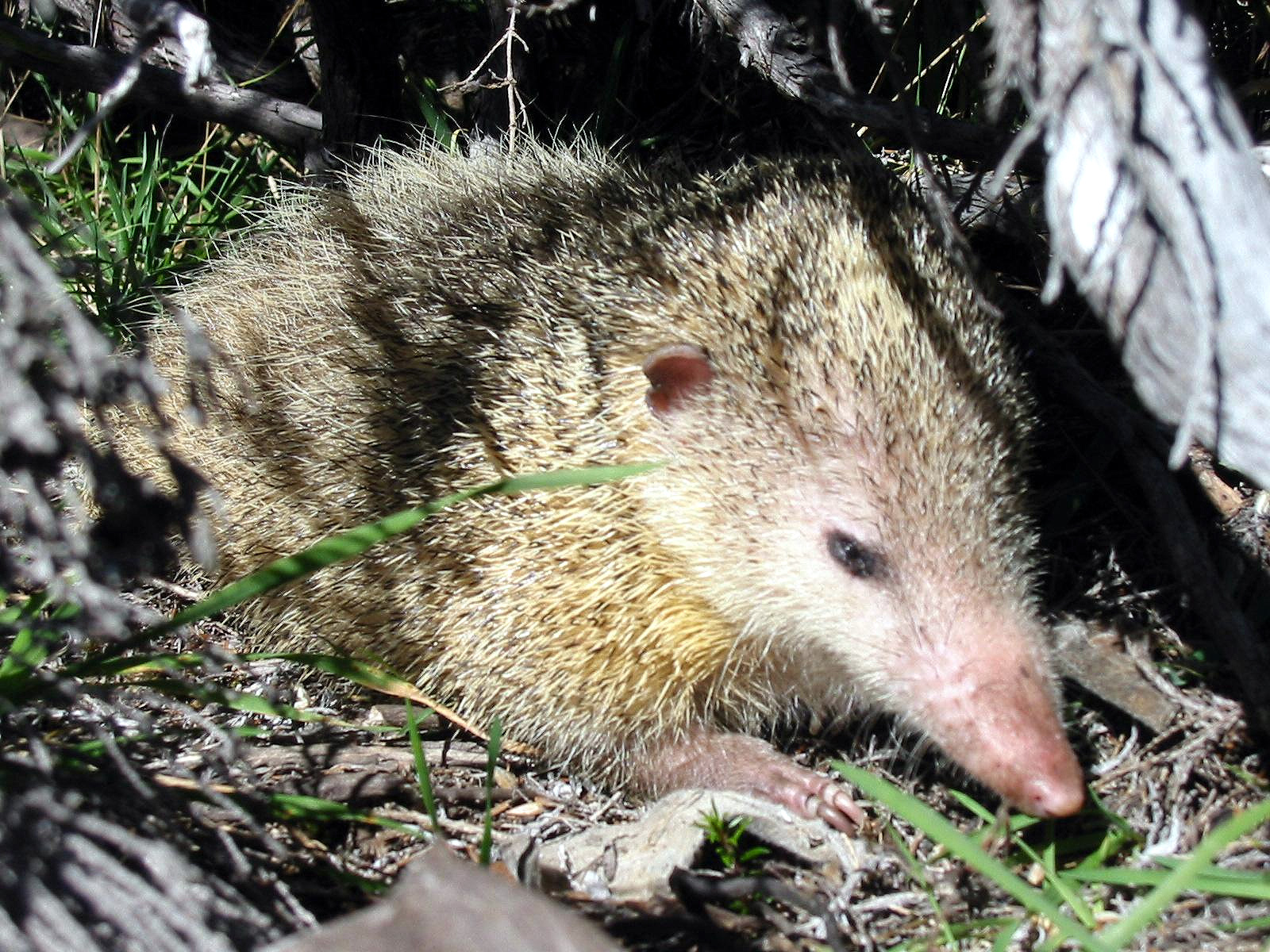
- Tailless tenrec (Tenrec ecaudatus)

Scientific classification
- Kingdom: Animalia
- Phylum: Chordata
- Class: Mammalia
- Infraclass: Placentalia
- Order: Afrosoricida
- Suborder: Tenrecomorpha
- Family: Tenrecidae; Gray, 1821

Type genus
- Tenrec Lacépède, 1799

Subfamilies
- Geogalinae; Oryzorictinae; Tenrecinae
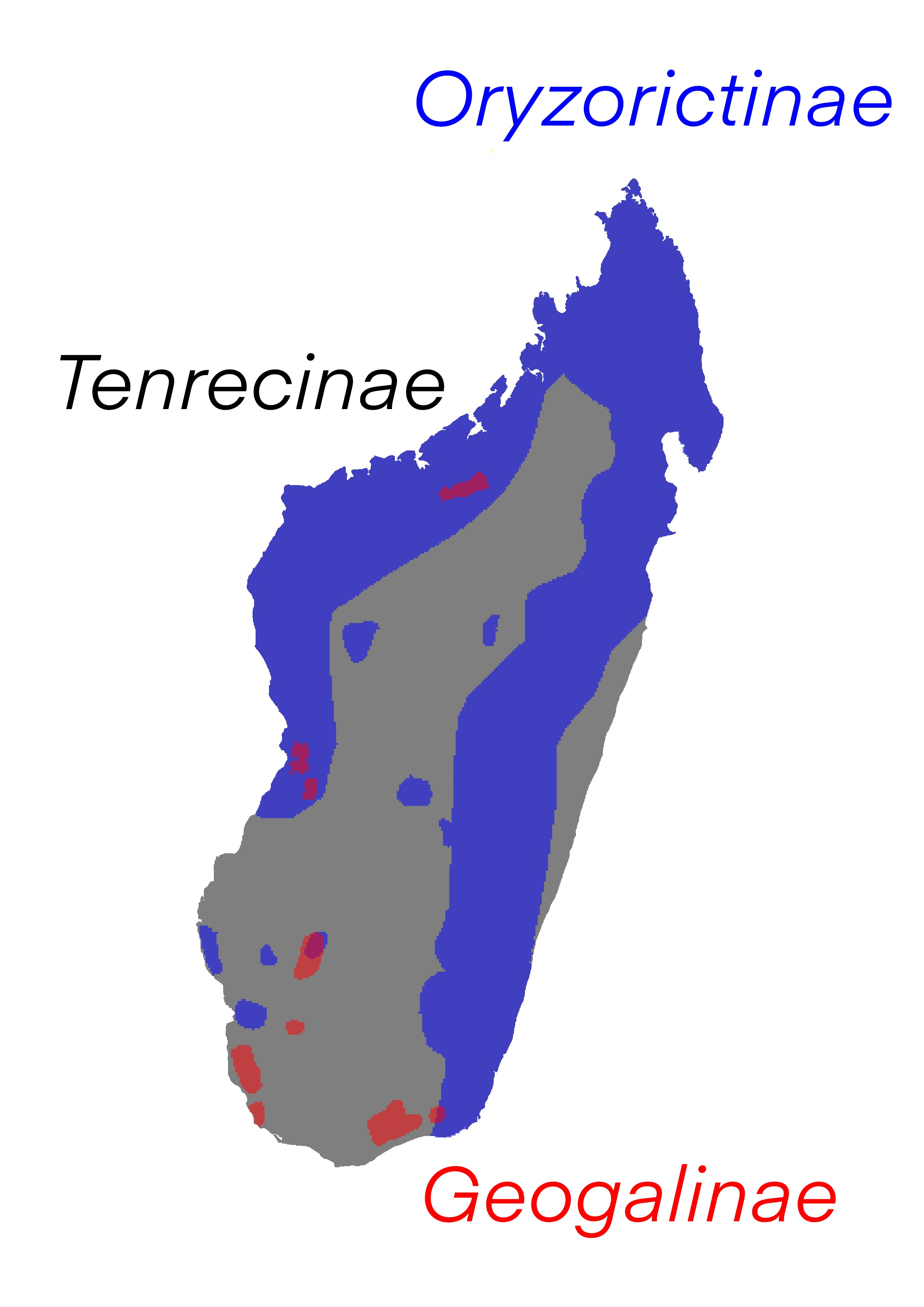
- Gray: Tenrecinae; Blue: Tenrecinae and Oryzorictinae; Red: Geogalinae and Tenrecinae; Purple: Geogalinae, Oryzorictinae and Tenrecinae

= Tenrec =

Tenrecidae Temporal range: Bartonian–Recent

Family of small mammals

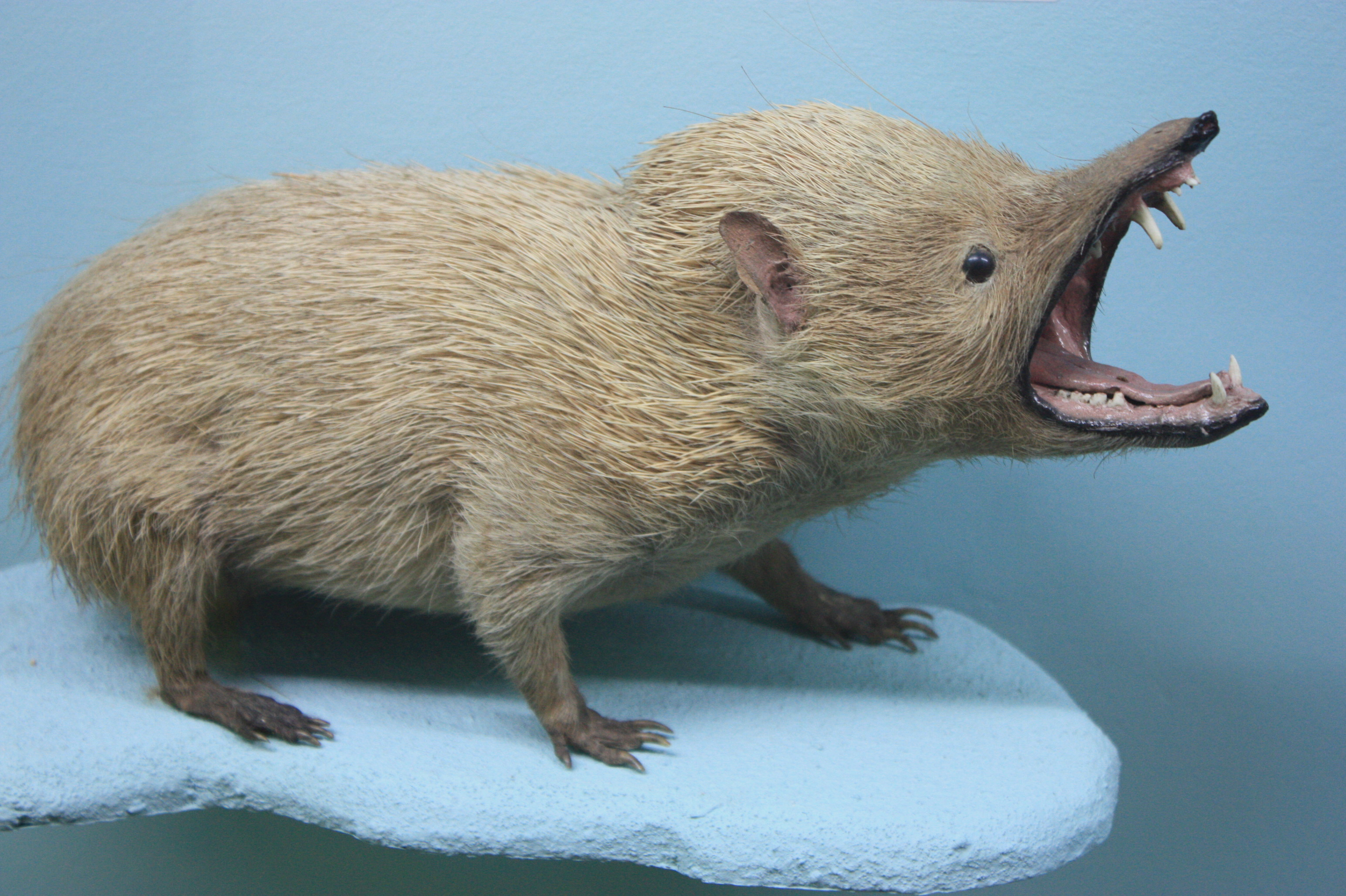
A taxidermy mount of a tenrec in defensive posture, Horniman Museum and Gardens, London

A tenrec (/ˈtɛnrɛk/) is a mammal belonging to any species within the afrotherian family Tenrecidae, which is endemic to Madagascar. Tenrecs are a very diverse group, as a result of adaptive radiation, and exhibit convergent evolution; some resemble hedgehogs, shrews, opossums, rats, or mice. They occupy aquatic, arboreal, terrestrial, and fossorial environments. Some of these species, including the greater hedgehog tenrec, can be found in the Madagascar dry deciduous forests. However, the speciation rate in this group has been higher in humid forests.

All tenrecs are believed to descend from a common ancestor that lived 29–37 million years ago after rafting over from Africa. The split from their closest relatives, African otter shrews, is estimated to have occurred about 47–53 million years ago.

== Etymology ==
The word "tenrec" is borrowed, via French, from the Malagasy word tandraka (variant of trandraka), which refers to the tailless tenrec (Tenrec ecaudatus); the Malagasy word may be related to Malay: landak, lit. 'porcupine'.

== Evolution ==
Tenrecs are believed to have evolved from a single species that colonized Madagascar between 42 and 25 million years ago. The question of how this family reached Madagascar is still unresolved, but the leading hypothesis suggests a small number of individuals may have found themselves on floating vegetation and crossed the Mozambique Channel, which separates Madagascar from southeastern Africa. The Tenrecidae family is one of only four extant terrestrial mammal lineages to have colonized and diversified on Madagascar.

Once established on Madagascar, tenrecs diversified to occupy various niches on the island. Many evolved resemblances to familiar but unrelated mammals that are not found on Madagascar. For instance, the two species of hedgehog tenrec possess coats of hardened spines and the ability to roll into a ball when threatened, characteristics similar to those of true hedgehogs. This example, along with others, demonstrates convergent evolution; it has provided evolutionary biologists with opportunities to study adaptation over evolutionary timescales.

== Characteristics ==
Tenrecs are small mammals of variable body form. The smallest species are the size of shrews, with a body length of around 4.5 cm (1.8 in), and weighing just 5 g (0.18 oz), while the largest, the common or tailless tenrec, is 25 to 39 cm (9.8 to 15.4 in) in length, and can weigh over 1 kilogram (2.2 lb). Although they may resemble shrews, hedgehogs, or opossums, they are not closely related to any of these groups, their closest relatives being the otter shrews, and after that other African insectivorous mammals including golden moles and elephant shrews. The common ancestry of these animals, which are classified together in the clade Afrotheria, was not recognized until the late 1990s. Continuing work on the molecular and morphological diversity of afrotherian mammals has provided ever increasing support for their common ancestry.

Tenrecs are among the few terrestrial mammals that echolocate. Unusual among placental mammals, the rectum and urogenital tracts of tenrecs share a common opening, or cloaca which is a feature more commonly seen in birds, reptiles, and amphibians. They have a low body temperature, sufficiently low that they do not require a scrotum to cool their sperm as do most other mammals.

All species appear to be at least somewhat omnivorous, with invertebrates forming the largest part of their diets. One species, Microgale mergulus, is semiaquatic (similar to the lifestyle of their closest relatives, the otter shrews). All of the species, semiaquatic or not, appear to have evolved from a single, common ancestor with the otter shrews comprising the next, most-closely related mammalian species. While the fossil record of tenrecs is scarce, at least some specimens from the early Miocene of Kenya show close affinities to living species from Madagascar, such as Geogale aurita.

Most species are nocturnal and have poor eyesight. Their other senses are well developed, however and they have especially sensitive whiskers. As with many of their other features, the dental formula of tenrecs varies greatly between species; they can have from 32 to 42 teeth in total. Unusual for mammals, the permanent dentition in tenrecs tends not to completely erupt until well after adult body size has been reached. This is one of several anatomical features shared by elephants, hyraxes, sengis, and golden moles (but apparently not aardvarks), consistent with their descent from a common ancestor.

Tenrecs have a gestation period of 50 to 64 days, and give birth to a number of relatively undeveloped young. While the otter shrews have just two young per litter, the tailless tenrec can have as many as 32, and females possess up to 29 teats, more than any other mammal. Some tenrec species are social, living in multigenerational family groups with over a dozen individuals.

== Interaction with humans ==
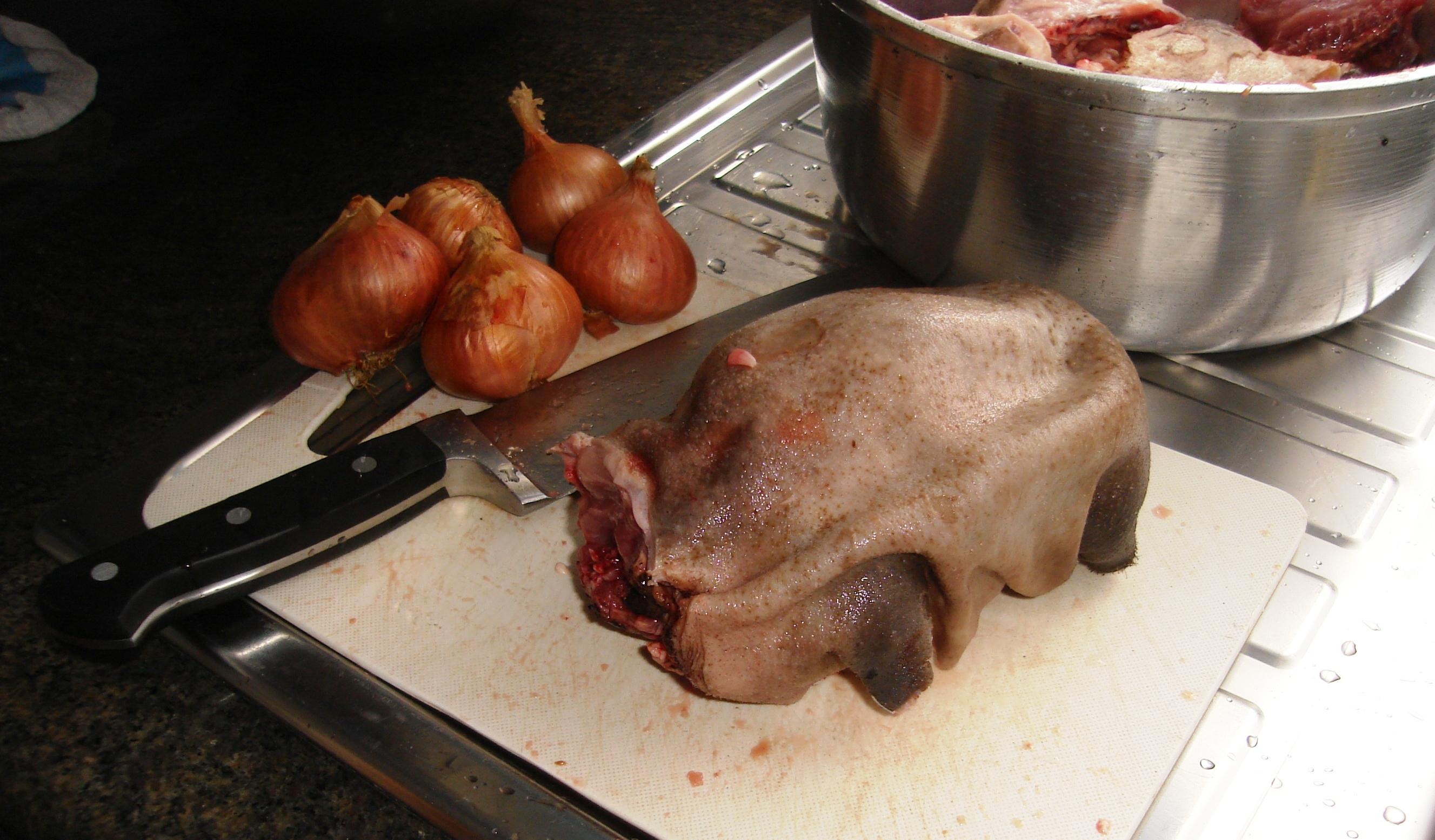
Tailless tenrec (Tenrec ecaudatus) prepared for cooking in a Malagasy kitchen.

In the island nation of Mauritius, and also on the Comoran island of Mayotte, some of the inhabitants eat tenrec meat, although it is difficult to obtain (as it is not sold in shops or markets) and difficult to prepare correctly.

The lesser hedgehog tenrec (Echinops telfairi) is one of 16 mammalian species that will have its genome sequenced as part of the Mammalian Genome Project. It is increasingly popular in the pet trade, and in the future may serve as an important model organism in biomedicine, as it is only distantly related to the mice, rats, guinea pigs and rhesus macaques which comprise the most common research animals.

== Threats ==
Of the 31 species assessed, 24 (77%) are categorized by the IUCN Red List as least concern, one species as data deficient, four species as vulnerable, and two species as endangered.

The conservation status of many tenrec species is of concern due to an increase of threats within the last 50 years. The main threats facing them include habitat loss due to deforestation, fragmentation, and degradation; hunting; incidental capture; and climate change. Slash-and-burn agriculture, commercial logging, and mining of metals are negatively affecting tenrec species that inhabit forests. Five of the six threatened tenrec species are dependent on forest habitats.

== Conservation ==
As of 2022, conservation of the tenrec population is not being prioritized. Because most tenrecs are dependent on forest habitats, conservation efforts would need to include a focus on reduction in deforestation on Madagascar, as well as habitat restoration. Current conservation efforts include that of the Madagascar Ankizy Fund, started by a paleontological team from Stony Brook University, to improve access to health care and education facilities for villagers in remote areas of Madagascar. A healthy and educated local human population, in the long term, will benefit the Malagasy fauna, such as tenrecs.

== Species ==
The three subfamilies, eight genera, and 31 extant species of tenrecs are:

FAMILY TENRECIDAE

- Subfamily Geogalinae
  - Genus Geogale
    - Large-eared tenrec (Geogale aurita)
- Subfamily Oryzorictinae
  - Genus Microgale
    - Short-tailed shrew tenrec (Microgale brevicaudata)
    - Cowan's shrew tenrec (Microgale cowani)
    - Drouhard's shrew tenrec (Microgale drouhardi)
    - Dryad shrew tenrec (Microgale dryas)
    - Pale shrew tenrec (Microgale fotsifotsy)
    - Gracile shrew tenrec (Microgale gracilis)
    - Grandidier's shrew tenrec (Microgale grandidieri)
    - Naked-nosed shrew tenrec (Microgale gymnorhyncha)
    - Jenkins's shrew tenrec (Microgale jenkinsae)
    - Northern shrew tenrec (Microgale jobihely)
    - Lesser long-tailed shrew tenrec (Microgale longicaudata)
    - Microgale macpheei (extinct)
    - Major's long-tailed tenrec (Microgale majori)
    - Web-footed tenrec (Microgale mergulus)
    - Montane shrew tenrec (Microgale monticola)
    - Nasolo's shrew tenrec (Microgale nasoloi)
    - Pygmy shrew tenrec (Microgale parvula)
    - Greater long-tailed shrew tenrec (Microgale principula)
    - Least shrew tenrec (Microgale pusilla)
    - Shrew-toothed shrew tenrec (Microgale soricoides)
    - Taiva shrew tenrec (Microgale taiva)
    - Thomas's shrew tenrec (Microgale thomasi)
  - Genus Nesogale
    - Dobson's shrew tenrec (Nesogale dobsoni)
    - Talazac's shrew tenrec (Nesogale talazaci)
  - Genus Oryzorictes
    - Mole-like rice tenrec (Oryzorictes hova)
    - Four-toed rice tenrec (Oryzorictes tetradactylus)
- Subfamily Tenrecinae
  - Tribe Setiferini
    - Genus Echinops
      - Lesser hedgehog tenrec (Echinops telfairi)
    - Genus Setifer
      - Greater hedgehog tenrec (Setifer setosus)
  - Tribe Tenrecini
    - Genus Hemicentetes
      - Highland streaked tenrec (Hemicentetes nigriceps)
      - Lowland streaked tenrec (Hemicentetes semispinosus)
    - Genus Tenrec
      - Common tenrec (Tenrec ecaudatus)

== See also ==
- List of mammals of Madagascar
