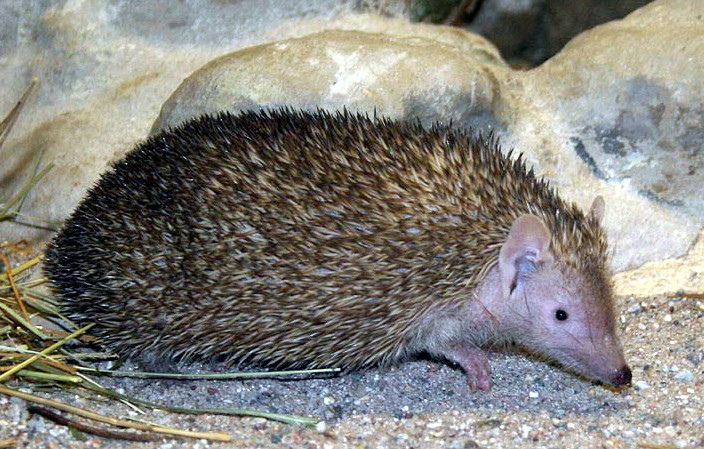

Conservation status
- Least Concern (IUCN 3.1)

Scientific classification
- Kingdom: Animalia
- Phylum: Chordata
- Class: Mammalia
- Order: Afrosoricida
- Suborder: Tenrecomorpha
- Family: Tenrecidae
- Genus: Echinops; Martin, 1838
- Species: E. telfairi

Binomial name
- Echinops telfairi Martin, 1838
- Lesser hedgehog tenrec range

= Lesser hedgehog tenrec =

Species of mammal

The lesser hedgehog tenrec (Echinops telfairi) is a species of mammal in the family Tenrecidae. It is the only species in the genus Echinops and is named in honour of Charles Telfair. It is endemic to Madagascar. Its natural habitats are subtropical or tropical dry forests, shrubland, and shrubland and dry savanna.

== Description ==
The lesser hedgehog tenrec is a small, stout-bodied animal visually similar to a hedgehog, hence the name. Their tails are short, their limbs and muzzles are of moderate length, and their ears are prominent. The entire dorsum is covered with sharp spines. Color is usually yellow buff; individuals range from near white to almost black. Head and body length is 5 to 6.8 inches (13 to 17 cm). Weight is about 7 ounces (0.2 kg).

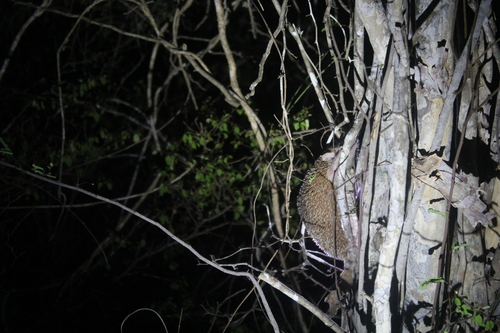
A lesser hedgehog tenrec climbing trees in Madagascar at night.

Lesser hedgehog tenrecs (like all tenrecs) have a cloaca (common urogenital opening), like a bird or a reptile.

== Behavior ==
This tenrec is terrestrial. It spends its daytime hours resting under a log, a pile of branches, leaves, straws or in a hollow tree, although trees are widely scattered in its native habitat. In hot weather, it sleeps with its body extended, but otherwise lies in a curled position to rest. It enters a state of torpor in the winter time.

They mostly feed upon insects but may prey on small vertebrates, and usually forage alone, except for a mother with her young.

Breeding is known to occur in October but may depend on warm weather first arousing the animals from winter torpor and on an available food supply.

The lesser hedgehog tenrec is a host of the Acanthocephalan intestinal parasite Promoniliformis ovocristatus.

== Captivity ==
The lesser hedgehog tenrec has become popular in the exotic pet industry.

== Parasites ==
The Acanthocephalan parasitic worm Promoniliformis ovocristatus was discovered in the intestine of the lesser hedgehog tenrec.
