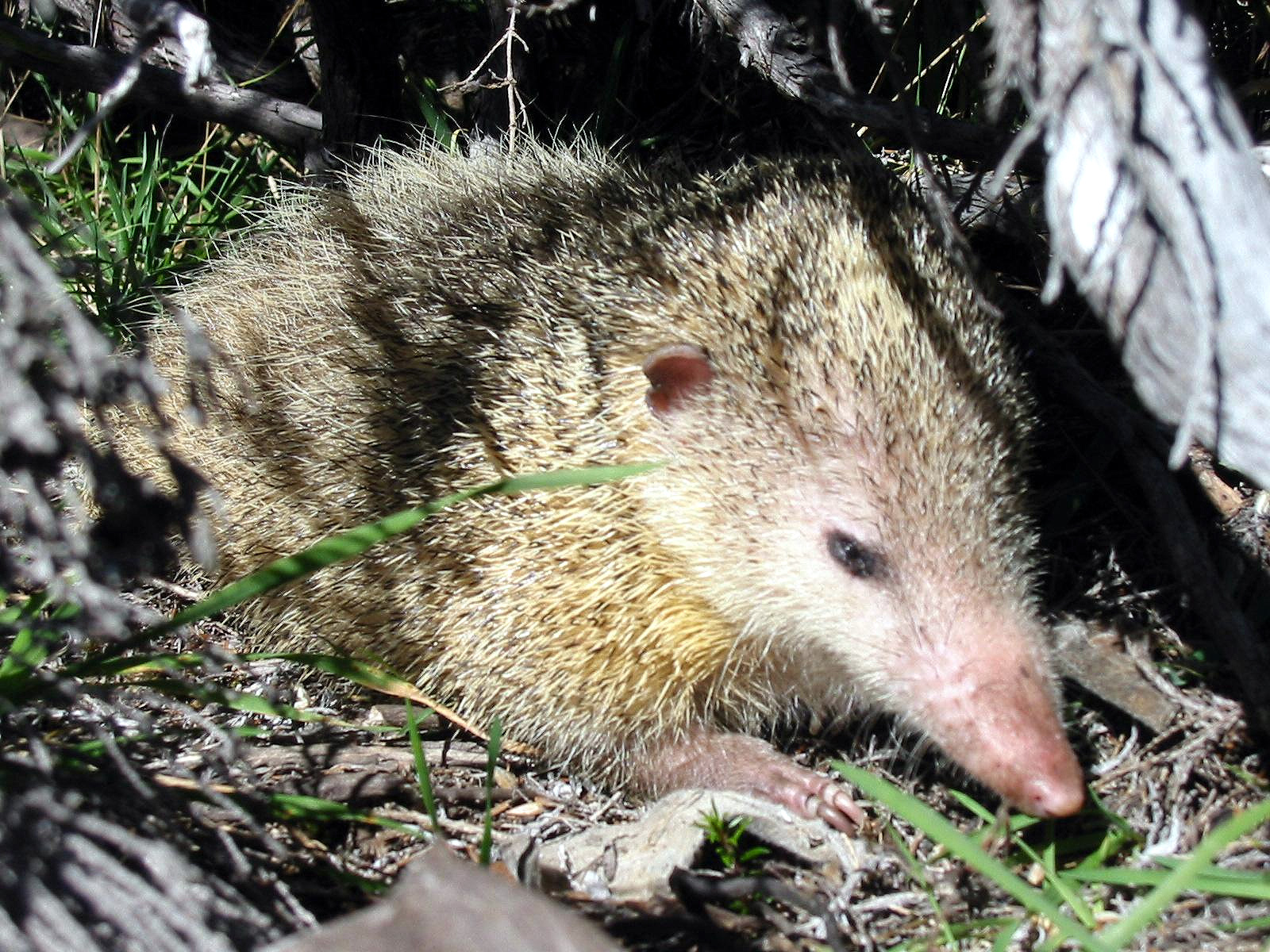

Conservation status
- Least Concern (IUCN 3.1)

Scientific classification
- Kingdom: Animalia
- Phylum: Chordata
- Class: Mammalia
- Order: Afrosoricida
- Suborder: Tenrecomorpha
- Family: Tenrecidae
- Subfamily: Tenrecinae
- Genus: Tenrec; Lacépède, 1799
- Species: T. ecaudatus

Binomial name
- Tenrec ecaudatus (Schreber, 1778)
- Tailless tenrec range

= Tailless tenrec =

Species of mammal

The tailless tenrec (Tenrec ecaudatus), also known as the common tenrec, is a species of mammal in the family Tenrecidae. It is the only member of the genus Tenrec. Native to Madagascar, it is also found on the Comoros, Mauritius, Réunion, and Seychelles island groups, where it has been purposely introduced. Its natural habitat is the understory of subtropical-tropical forest, open forest, arid shrub-land, savanna, arable land, pastures, crop plantations, private gardens, and some landscaped, urban areas.

The tailless tenrec is the largest species of the tenrec family, Tenrecidae. It is 26 to 39 cm (10 to 15 in) in length and weighs up to 2 kilograms (4.4 lb). It has medium-sized, coarse grey to reddish-grey fur and long, sharp spines along its body. The animal is omnivorous, and unlike the herbivorous rodents for which it is often mistaken, possesses small, needle-like sharp teeth for a diet of larger invertebrates, frogs, reptiles, mice, and other small mammals, as well as fruits, leaves, and other vegetation. If threatened, this tenrec will scream, erect its spiny hairs to a crest, jump, buck, and bite. It shelters in a nest of grass and leaves under a rock, log, or bush by day. It gives birth to a litter of as many as 32 young, with an average litter numbering between 15 and 20 after a gestation of 50–60 days; when young, they have a black-and-white-striped appearance. Despite being sometimes known as the tailless tenrec, it has a small tail 1.0 to 1.5 cm (0.39 to 0.59 in) in length.

The tailless tenrec was the first tropical mammal observed to hibernate, for long stretches of time without waking periods, up to nine months at a time. The tailless tenrec is a host of the acanthocephalan intestinal parasite Promoniliformis ovocristatus.

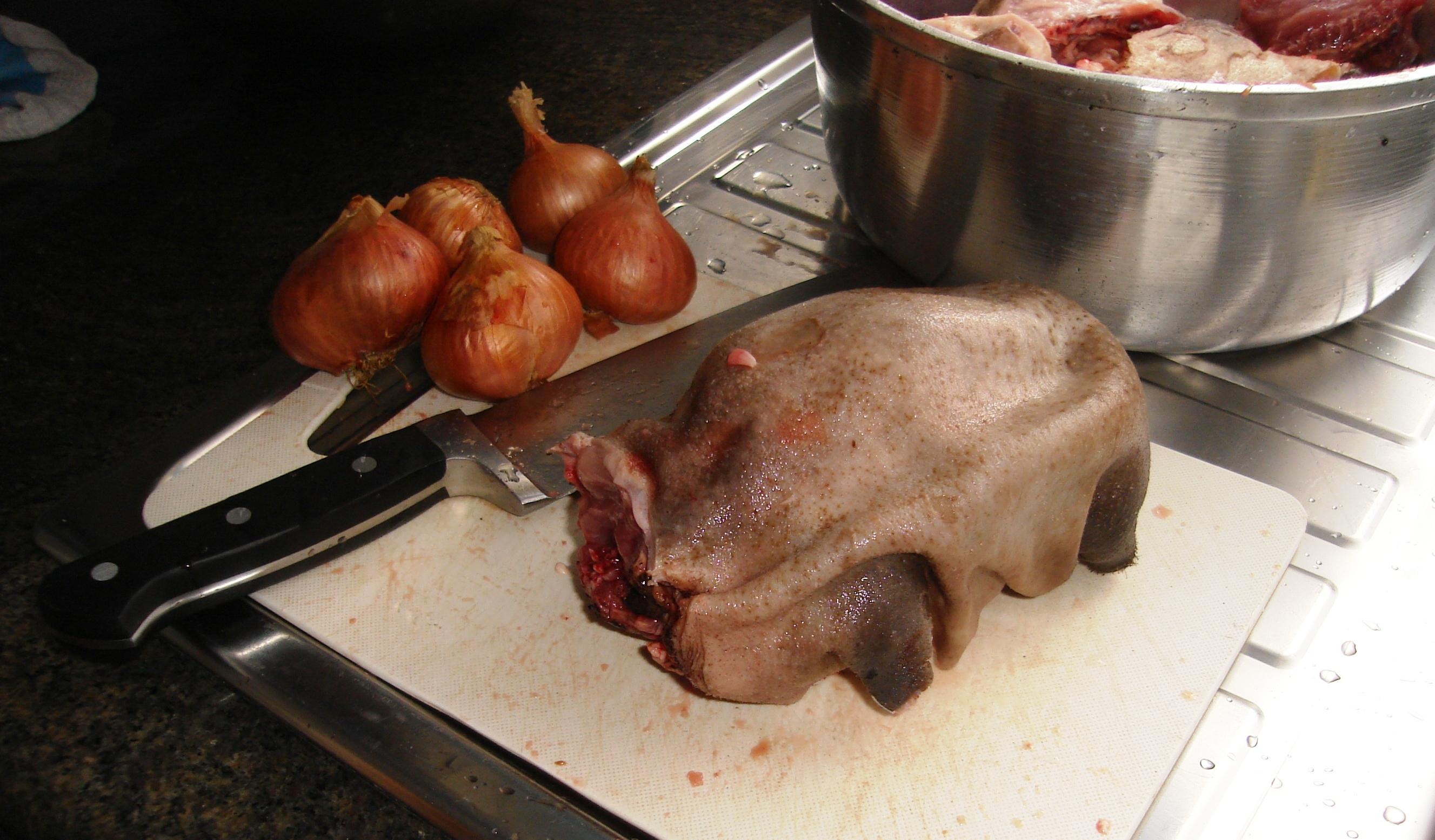
Tailless tenrec prepared for cooking in a Malagasy kitchen.

== Genomics ==
A chromosome-level genome assembly of the tailless tenrec (Tenrec ecaudatus) was published in 2026. The genome size is approximately 2.54 Gb, with the assembly anchored to 38 chromosomes. The assembly has a BUSCO completeness of 96.5%, and 22,573 protein-coding genes were predicted.
