= Black four-eyed opossum =

Scientific classification
- Kingdom: Animalia
- Phylum: Chordata
- Class: Mammalia
- Infraclass: Marsupialia
- Order: Didelphimorphia
- Family: Didelphidae
- Genus: Philander
- Species: P. nigratus

Binomial name
- Philander nigratus (O. Thomas, 1923)

Synonyms
- Metachirus opossum nigratus O. Thomas, 1923; Metachirops opossum nigratus (O. Thomas, 1923)

Species of marsupial

The black four-eyed opossum (Philander nigratus) is a species of opossum from South America.

== Taxonomy ==
This species was originally described as a subspecies of the gray four-eyed opossum under the name Metachirus opossum nigratus. The Spanish zoologist Ángel Cabrera went on to synonymize it with the gray four-eyed opossum. The American zoologist Alfred Gardner and later the American mammalogist Philip Hershkovitz would synonymize this species with Anderson's four-eyed opossum. It was recognized as a distinct species in 2020 following a study of the analysis of the cytochrome b of the holotype and other specimens. This analysis determined its closest relatives to be the dark four-eyed opossum and the northern four-eyed opossum.

This species is recognized by the American Society of Mammalogists, but not by the IUCN.

== Description ==
The back, muzzle, sides, head, and outer part of the legs of this species is greyish-black, and darker towards face and the middle of the back (but not forming a distinct stripe like the one in Anderson's four-eyed opossum). The underside is grayish, with lighter cream colors around the base of the legs and the underside of the jaw. Like all other Philander species, it has two light cream-colored spots above the eyes, and the ears are a similar color. Most of the tail is gray, darker at the base of the tail, and the final fourth to fifth of the tail is light gray to whitish. The body length ranges from 265 to 280 mm (10.4 to 11.0 in) with the tail length ranging from 275 to 300 mm (10.8 to 11.8 in).

Three other species are known to occur close to this species's range: Anderson's four-eyed opossum, McIlhenny's four-eyed opossum, and the common four-eyed opossum. This species lacks a dark dorsal stripe, seen in P. andersoni, and is generally darker. P. mcilhennyi is usually black instead of dark gray as in this species. P. canus has a uniformly cream-colored underside, while this species has a gray underside. Additionally, this species has less white on its tail (usually around a fourth or fifth of the tail) while those species have at least a third or more of the tail being white; this species also tends to have larger molars. The original description of P. nigratus noted that it did have a black dorsal line, but subsequent examinations of the holotype seemed to disagree with this.

== Range ==
This species is endemic to Peru. It is known only from the eastern foothills of the Andes Mountains, in the departments of Ayacucho and Junín. As of 2020, only eight specimens are known, so its known range may expand in the future. No other Philander species are known to occur sympatrically with this species, but this may change. Another didelphid with a range that may be similar to this species is Marmosops juninensis. The type locality is from the town of Utcuyacu in the Junín department.
