= Pebas four-eyed opossum =

Scientific classification
- Kingdom: Animalia
- Phylum: Chordata
- Class: Mammalia
- Infraclass: Marsupialia
- Order: Didelphimorphia
- Family: Didelphidae
- Genus: Philander
- Species: P. pebas

Binomial name
- Philander pebas Voss, Díaz-Nieto, & Jansa, 2018

Species of marsupial

The Pebas four-eyed opossum (Philander pebas) is a species of opossum from South America.

== Taxonomy ==
The Pebas four-eyed opossum was described in 2018 by Robert S. Voss, Juan F. Díaz-Nieto, and Sharon Jansa. Specimens of this species had previously been collected, but considered to be synonymous with the southern four-eyed opossum, the gray four-eyed opossum, or the common four-eyed opossum, with the lattermost being the sister species to P. pebas based on analysis of the cytochrome b. Eastern and western populations showed some genetic variation, but not enough to warrant subspecific status.

This species is recognized by the American Society of Mammalogists, but not the IUCN.

== Etymology ==
"Pebas" comes from Lago Pebas, a wide-spanning series of lakes that extended into the eastern lowlands of the Andes in modern-day Colombia, Ecuador, Peru, and Brazil. The lake occupied a similar areas as this species's modern range.

== Description ==
This species has short, grayish hairs across most of its back, sides, outer limbs, muzzle, and head, with the head and middle back being darker than the flanks. It lacks the dorsal stripe seen in some species, such as Anderson's four-eyed opossum. The stomach fur is mostly grayish with some cream or buffy colors along the base of the legs and bottom of the jaw. The tail is grayish, becoming paler towards the tip and white for the final part of the tail. In Amazonian populations, the final third to half of the tail is white, while western populations have only the final fourth of the tail white.

This species can be differentiated from its sister species, P. canus, by P. pebas being larger and, more importantly, having a grayer underside. Additionally, where P. canus and P. pebas have range overlap, P. pebas has less white on its tail. When compared to Anderson's four-eyed opossum and McIlhenny's four-eyed opossum, this species can be differentiated by it lacking a dorsal stripe, being lighter-colored, and its distinct tail coloration.

== Range ==
This species is known from Brazil, Peru, and Ecuador. One specimen collected in 1989 was less than 35 km (22 mi) from Bolivia, but this species is not officially known from that country; it may also occur in Colombia. It occurs sympatrically with P. andersoni in northern Peru, and with P. canus and P. mcilhennyi in eastern Peru and western Amazonian Brazil.

== Habitat ==
This species is primarily associated with várzea rainforests. It can tolerate a wide variety of habitats, and has been found in well-drained and hillside forests. In areas where their range overlaps, this species occupies lowlands while McIlhenny's four-eyed opossum occupies higher-altitude habitats. This species has also been recorded from swamps and human-disturbed habitats such as agricultural fields. Given its association with whitewater rivers in the Amazon basin, it may be found along the Caquetá River and Putumayo River in Colombia.

== Ecology ==
Similar to its congeners, this species is likely a true omnivore, consuming invertebrates, small vertebrates, fruits, nectar, carrion, and some cereals. This species primarily hunts along the ground or low in the forest understory at night. While little is known of this species's diet given its recent description, it was recorded feeding on a member of the Rhinella margaritifera species complex . R. margaritifera is relatively toxic, suggesting that Philander pebas may have a high tolerance to some bufotoxins. This species is primarily found in flooded wetlands, which is where toads and frogs would be especially numerous.

When the habitat of this species is flooded it either flees to higher grounds, climbs to the upper canopy, or a combination of both of these.
