= List of mammals described in the 2000s =

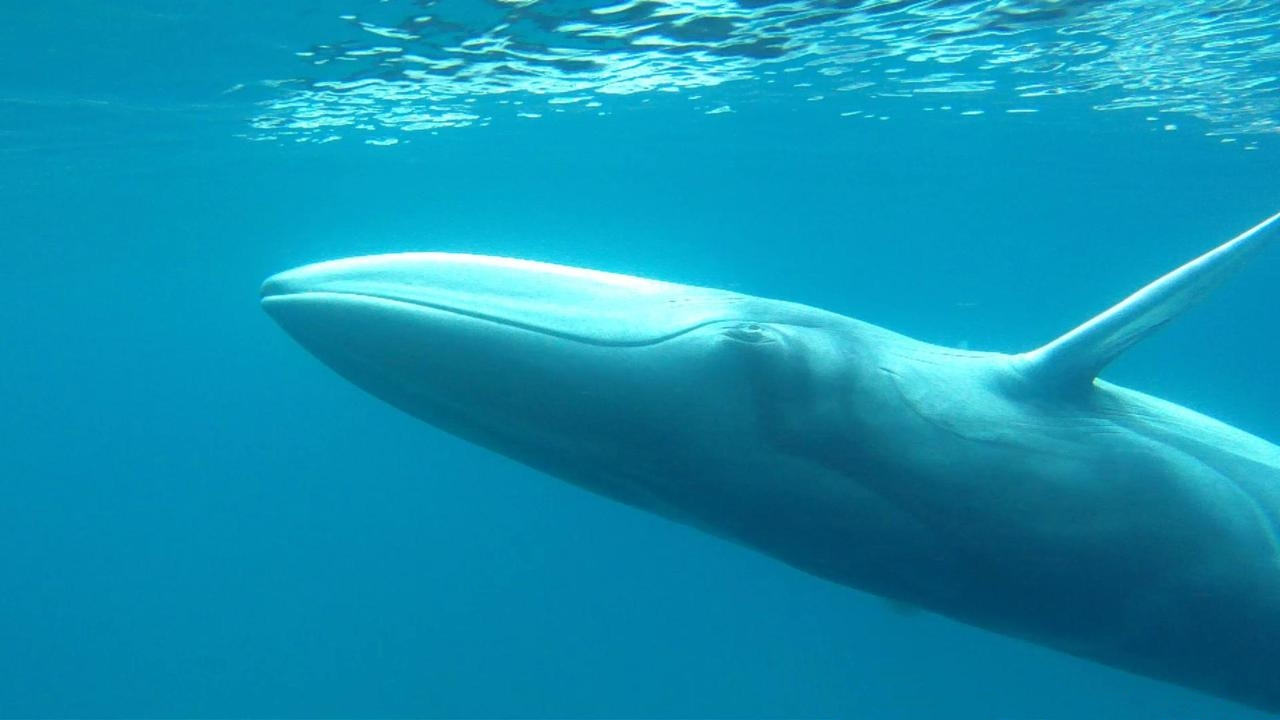
Omura’s whale was first described in 2003

Although the mammals are well studied in comparison to other animal groups, new species are still being discovered. This list includes extant mammal species discovered, formally named, or brought to public light in 2000 or later. Notable subspecies are also included, as are mammals rediscovered after being declared, or seriously suspected to be, extinct.

Newly discovered fossils are not included.

== Marsupials ==
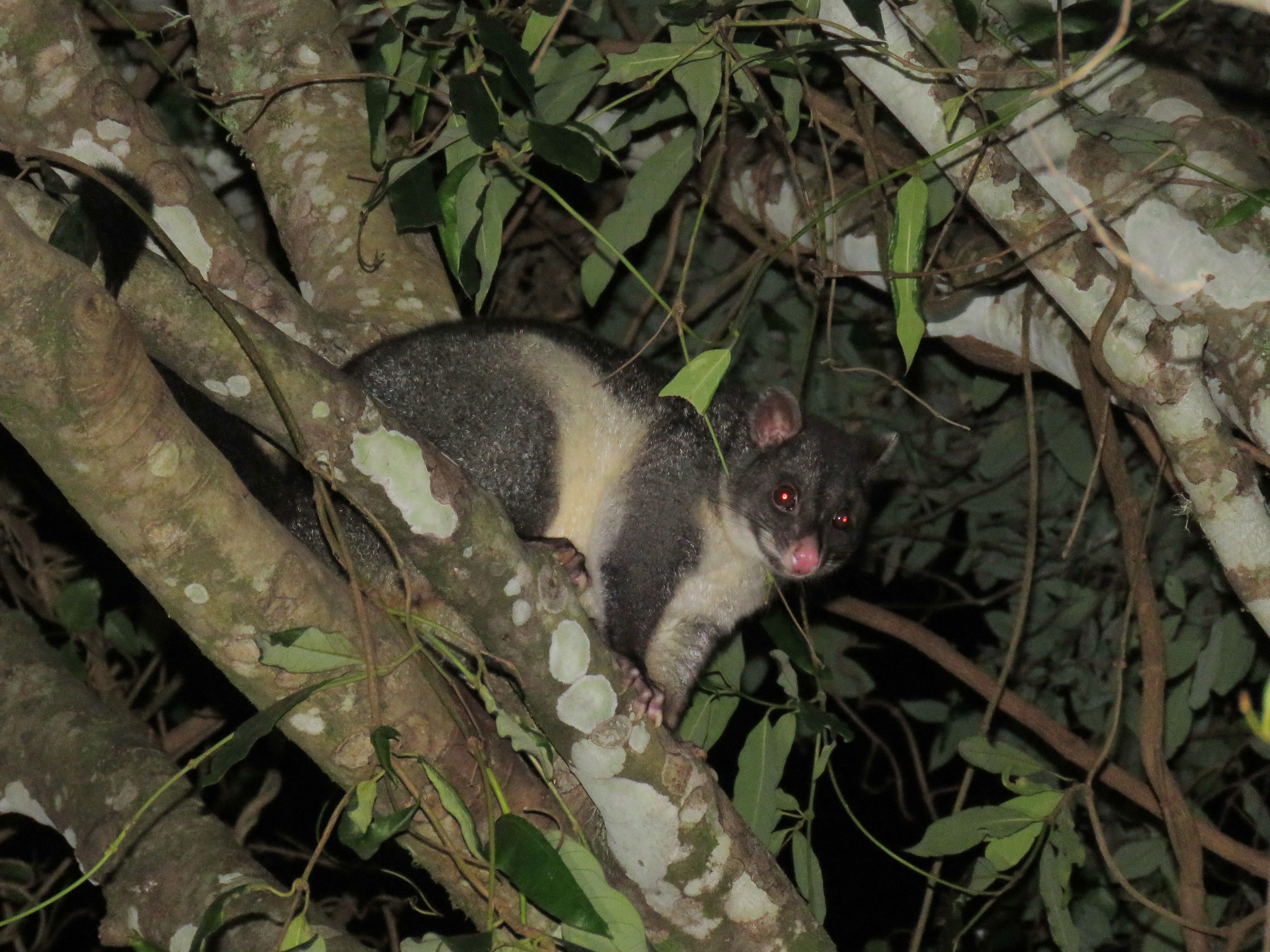
Short-eared possum

At least five new species of marsupials have been discovered since 2000:

- Delta opossum (Philander deltae)
- Mondolfi's four-eyed opossum (Philander mondolfii)
- Arfak pygmy bandicoot (Microperoryctes aplini)
- Short-eared possum (Trichosurus caninus)
- Red-bellied gracile opossum (Cryptonanus ignitus)

== Elephants ==
In 2001, genetic evidence emerged that the African elephant (Loxodonta africana), once thought to be a single species, was in fact two, as the smaller African forest elephant was in fact a distinct species (Loxodonta cyclotis). L. africana is now commonly referred to as the African bush elephant. Strictly speaking, this is not a newly discovered species, but simply an alternative taxonomic treatment, as cyclotis was already recognized, but only as a subspecies.

== Sloths ==
The pygmy three-toed sloth (Bradypus pygmaeus) was named in 2001, after its discovery in the mangrove swamps of Isla Escudo de Veraguas, a tiny island off the western coast of Panama. They weigh 40% less than mainland sloths, are 20% smaller, and have a distinctive fringe of long hair.

== Primates ==
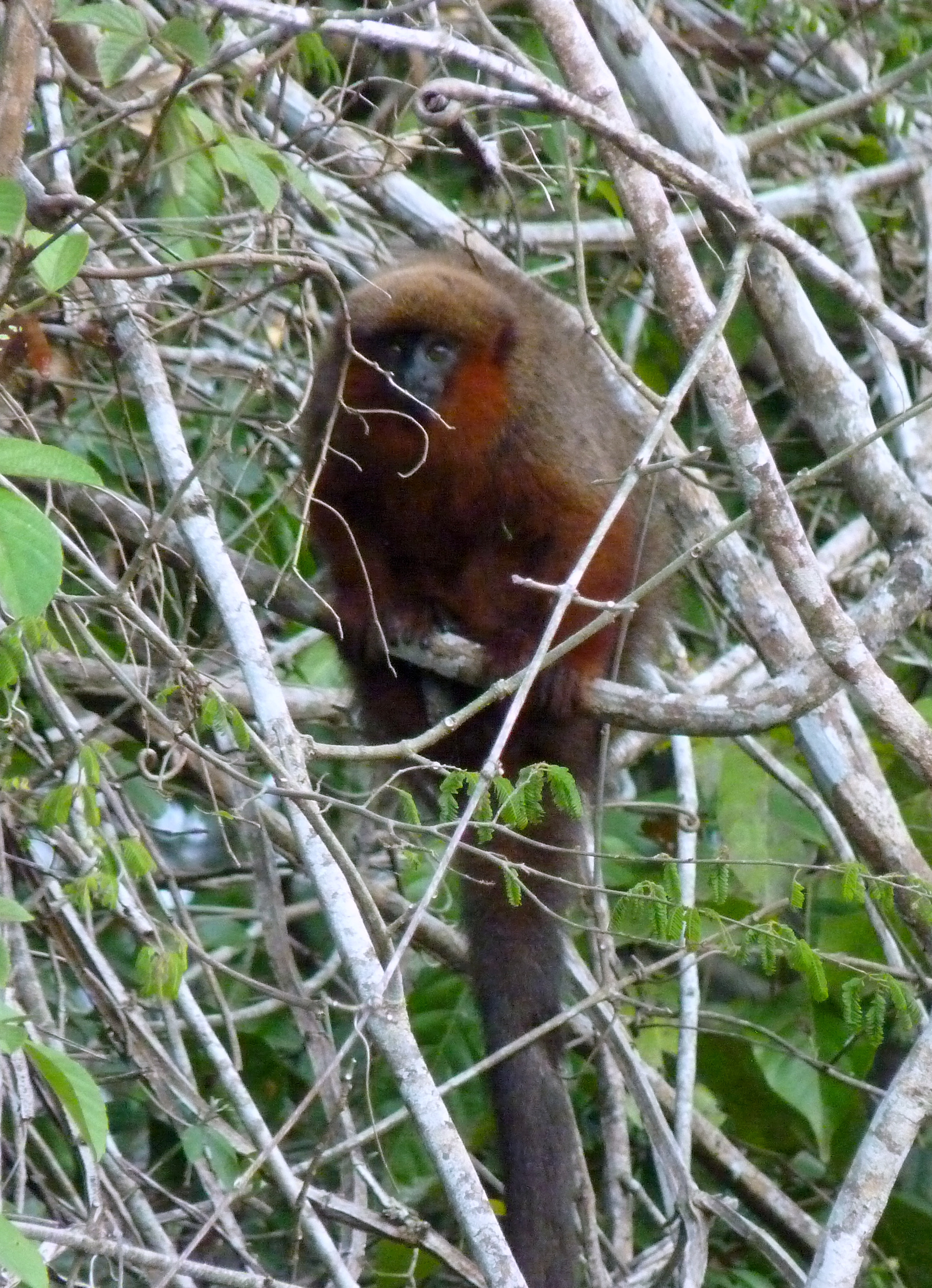
Madidi titi

36 primate species were described in the 2000s including the golden palace monkey or Madidi titi, named by auction.

== Lagomorphs ==
Three species of lagomorph have been described in the 21st century: the black pika (Ochotona nigritia), the Venezuelan lowland rabbit (Sylvilagus varynaensis), and the Annamite striped rabbit (Nesolagus timminsi).

== Rodents ==
A number of rodents are described each year. Notable among those described since 2000 are the Cypriot mouse (Mus cypriacus), and the Laotian rock rat (Laonastes aenigmamus), which represents a family, Diatomyidae, thought to be extinct since the Miocene, and has been described as a living fossil.

== Bats ==
At least 30 new bat species have been described since 2000. The new species were found in Africa, Latin America, Asia, Oceania, and Europe.

== Even-toed ungulates ==
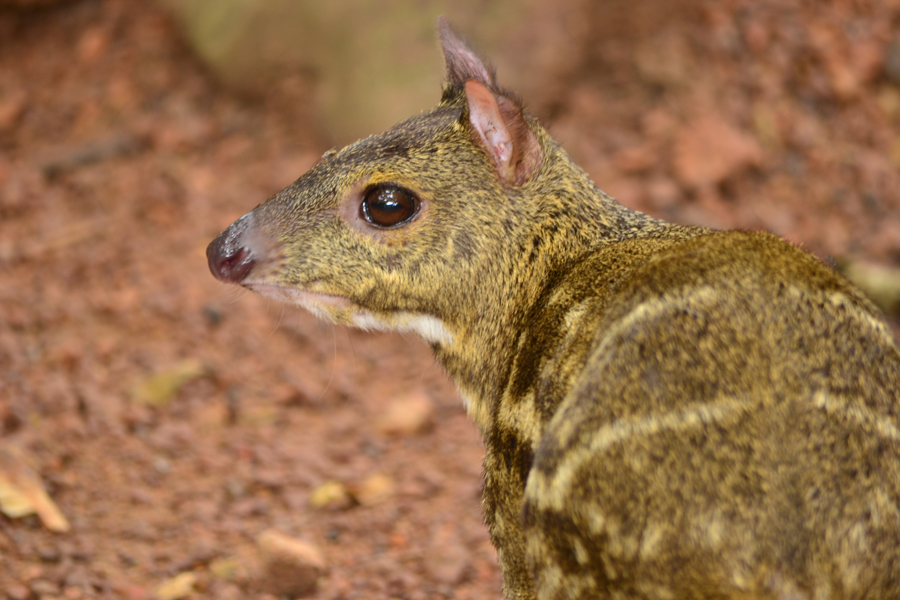
yellow-striped chevrotain

Since 2000, several new species of cetartiodactyl have been described, including three aquatic species (the Australian snubfin dolphin, Perrin's beaked whale, and Omura's whale) and two terrestrial ungulates (Roosevelt's muntjac and the yellow-striped chevrotain). Additionally, the northern right whale, previously considered a single species, was proposed to consist of a Pacific and an Atlantic species.

== Carnivorans ==
Several new subspecies of previously known species were described. Additionally, an alternative taxonomic treatment of the clouded leopard was proposed, in which the taxon diardi, previously considered a subspecies of Neofelis nebulosa, was proposed a separate species, the Sunda clouded leopard (Neofelis diardi). In 2013, the olinguito, living in the Andean cloud forest, was determined to be a distinct species. It had previously been categorized as a small olingo.

== See also ==
- List of mammals
- List of mammals described in the 21st century
- List of megafauna discovered in modern times
- List of shrews and moles described in the 2000s
