= Olrog =

Olrog may refer to:

== People ==
- Claës Christian Olrog (1912-1985), Swedish-Argentinian zoologist
- Margaret Olrog Stoddart (1865–1934), New Zealand artist
- Peter Olrog Schjøtt (1833–1926), Norwegian philologist and politician
- Ulf Peder Olrog (1919–1972), Swedish folklorist, lecturer, composer, songwriter, and radio personality

== Species ==
- Olrog's chaco mouse
- Olrog's cinclodes
- Olrog's four-eyed opossum
- Olrog's gull
