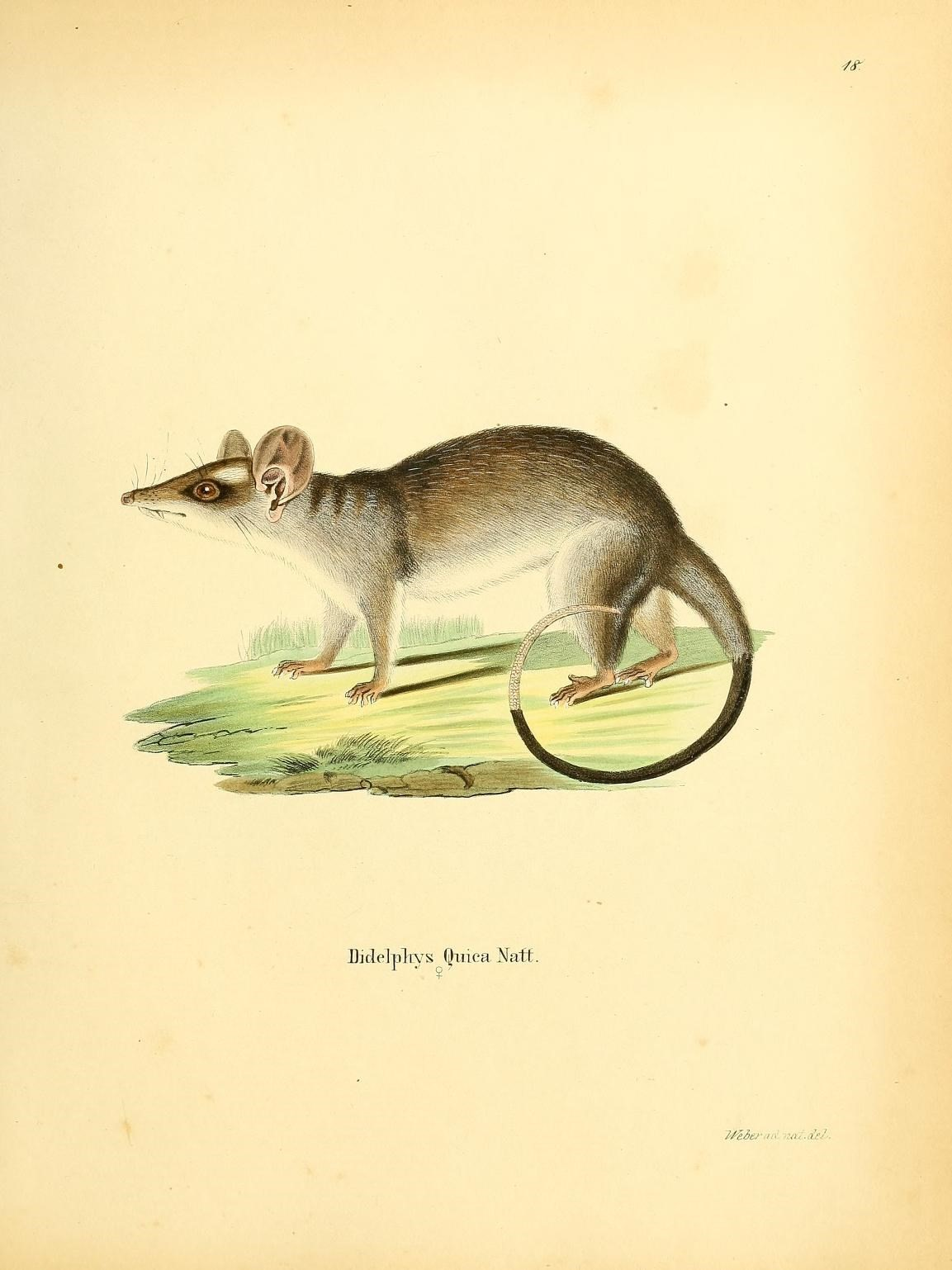

Scientific classification
- Kingdom: Animalia
- Phylum: Chordata
- Class: Mammalia
- Infraclass: Marsupialia
- Order: Didelphimorphia
- Family: Didelphidae
- Genus: Philander
- Species: P. quica

Binomial name
- Philander quica (Temminck, 1824)
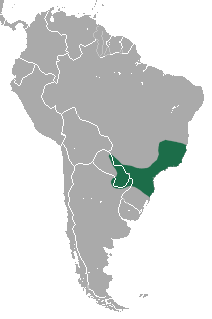
- Geographic range

Synonyms
- List: Didelphis quica Temminck, 1824; Didelphys (Metachirus) quica (Temminck, 1824); Didelphis (Metachirops) quica (Temminck, 1824); Holothylax quica (Temminck, 1824); Metachirops quica (Temminck, 1824); Metachirops opossum quica (Temminck, 1824); Philander opossum quica (Temminck, 1824); Metachirus opossum azaricus O. Thomas, 1923; Metachirops opossum azaricus (O. Thomas, 1923); Philander opossum azaricus (O. Thomas, 1923)

= Southern four-eyed opossum =

Species of marsupial

The southern four-eyed opossum (Philander quica) is a species of opossum from South America.

== Taxonomy ==
This species was described in 1824 by Coenraad Jacob Temminck in his 1824 work Monographies de Mammalogie. Similar to many early marsupials, this species was originally described in the genus Didelphis. This species was considered a valid species until 1935, when the Brazilian zoologist Alípio de Miranda-Ribeiro would consider it a subspecies of the gray four-eyed opossum.

The Atlantic Forest populations of Philander were considered to be Philander frenatus by James L. Patton & Maria Nazareth Ferreira da Silva in 1997, but the holotype of P. frenatus was collected in eastern Brazil near the city of Belém, well outside the range of this species. P. frenatus was collected by Friedrich Wilhelm Sieber, who never collected from near the Atlantic Forest. In 2018, P. frenatus was synonymized with Philander opossum, leaving "Philander quica" as the oldest valid name for this species.

Analysis of the cytochrome b and nucDNA of most members of the genus Philander has shown P. quica to be the sister taxon to all other Philander species.

This species is recognized by the American Society of Mammalogists, but not by the IUCN.

== Etymology ==
"quica" seems to come from a native name for this species. It is derived from the Portuguese word "cuíca", itself derived from a Tupi word.

== Description ==
The upper fur on this species is grayish, with darker underfur and darker near the ears and face. The underside is yellowish to whitish, with some gray colors near the sides, between the forearms, and on the bottom of the neck and jaw. It has two spots above each eye that are the same color as the underside. The tail is bald, and gray for half to two-thirds of its length, then white on the distal half to distal third. This species ranges in size from 230 mm (9.1 in) to 620 mm (24 in), averaging 487 mm (19.2 in). The tail length averages 262 mm (10.3 in) of this length, ranging from 170 mm (6.7 in) to 320 mm (13 in). Despite this wide range of sizes, there is no physical difference between populations across their range.

== Range and habitat ==
This species is found in southern Brazil, northeastern Argentina, and eastern Paraguay. Its range likely comes into contact with that of the common four-eyed opossum (P. canus) where the Atlantic Rainforest comes into contact with other forests, in Brazil and Paraguay. This is the only Philander species known from the Atlantic Rainforest.

This species is endemic to the Atlantic Rainforest, where it occupies almost all habitats within the region. It has been recorded from lowland forests, submontane forests, costal scrub, and even agricultural fields.

== Ecology ==
Similar to its congeners, this species is a true omnivore, consuming fruits, flowers, seeds, invertebrates, carrion, and small vertebrates. This species specifically has been recorded feeding on seeds, birds, mammals, reptiles, and various invertebrates, with birds and beetles being the most common prey items. This species is primarily terrestrial, nocturnal, and solitary. Litters average roughly 3-6 young per litter.
