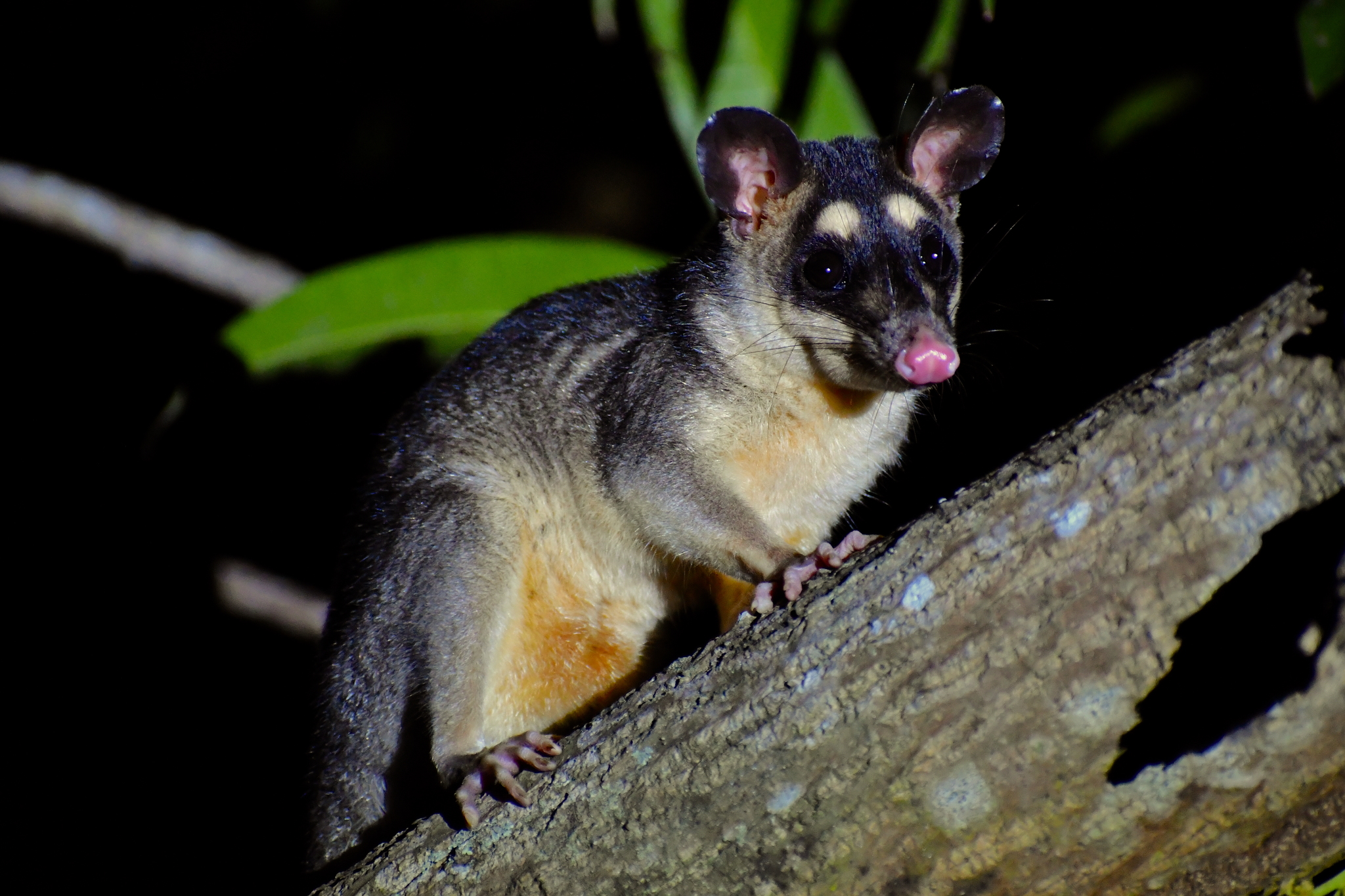

Scientific classification
- Kingdom: Animalia
- Phylum: Chordata
- Class: Mammalia
- Infraclass: Marsupialia
- Order: Didelphimorphia
- Family: Didelphidae
- Genus: Philander
- Species: P. vossi

Binomial name
- Philander vossi Gardner & Ramírez-Pulido, 2020

Synonyms
- List: Metachirus fuscogriseus pallidus J. A. Allen, 1901; Didelphis (Metachirops) pallidus (J. A. Allen, 1901); Metachirops opossum pallidus (J. A. Allen, 1901); Philander opossum pallidus (J. A. Allen, 1901); Philander pallidus (J. A. Allen, 1901)

= Northern four-eyed opossum =

Species of marsupial

The northern four-eyed opossum (Philander vossi) is a species of opossum from Central America.

== Taxonomy ==
This species was originally described by the American mammalogist Joel Asaph Allen in 1901 under the name Metachirus fuscogriseus pallidus; fuscogriseus is itself a synonym of Philander melanurus. It would later be elevated to species by German zoologist Paul Matschie in 1916, before being considered a subspecies of Philander opossum again in 1924 by Gerrit Smith Miller, Jr. It would remain at subspecific status until 2018, when an analysis of the cytochrome b, nucDNA, and physical characteristics warranted species status again. In 2020 it was found that the name pallidus was preoccupied by a subspecies of Derby's woolly opossum. The subspecies, today Caluromys derbianus pallidus, was originally described as Philander laniger pallidus, and was described two years before pallidus, in 1899. This makes the name pallidus preoccupied, so in 2020 Alfred L. Gardner and José Ramírez-Pulido decided to make a new species name for this taxa, choosing Philander vossi.

P. vossi is the sister species to the black four-eyed opossum (P. nigratus).

This species is recognized by the American Society of Mammalogists, but not by the IUCN, which recognizes neither P. pallidus nor P. vossi.

== Etymology ==
This species is named after the American mammalogist Robert S. Voss, a prolific mammalogist with an interest in neotropical species such as didelphids and rodents. Voss had revalidated this species in 2018 in a paper that also described one of its congeners as a new species and showed the phylogeny of much of this group.

== Description ==
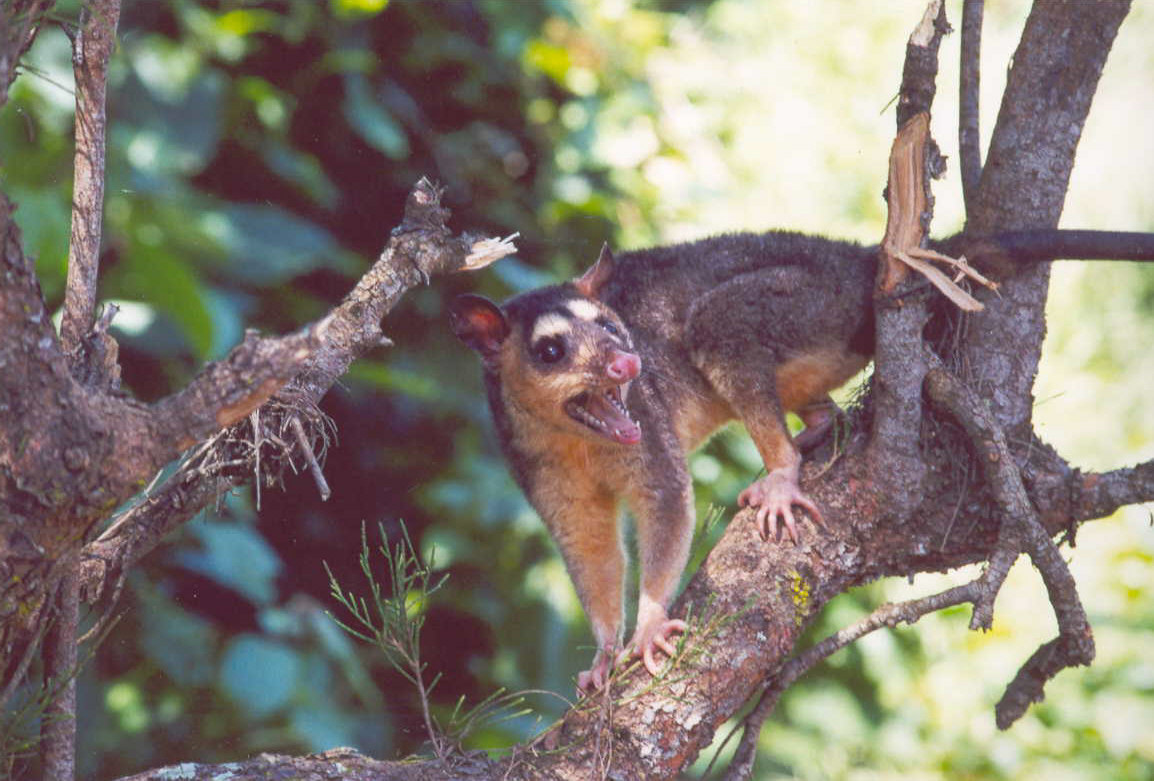
A northern four-eyed opossum from Coatzacoalcos, Veracruz, Mexico

These species are relatively light-furred for a Philander, with gray colors throughout the back, neck, base of the tail, and outer side of the limbs. The head can have some gray colors but tends to be darker, closer to black. The possum has two black eyes, despite its common name. The undersides are a yellowish color, extending onto the bottom of the jaw, the cheeks, and in front of the ears. It has two similarly yellowish-creamy-colored spots above each eye, giving it the name "four-eyed opossum". The tail is hairless and black for roughly the basal half its length, and white for the distal half. The feet are pink. When compared to P. melanurus, the closest species genetically and geographically, it tends to be lighter and have more white on the tail.

This species ranges from 475 mm (18.7 in) to 627 mm (24.7 in), with the tail making up 240 mm (9.4 in) to 315 mm (12.4 in) of this length.

== Range ==
This species is currently known only from Belize, El Salvador, and southern Mexico, but is almost certainly also in Guatemala. It may also occur in Honduras, Nicaragua, and Costa Rica but more surveying is needed in these regions. As of 2024, no research has been done to find the range border of this species and Philander melanurus, but data from the citizen science website iNaturalist indicates it is around the Nicaragua-Costa Rica border. The holotype is from the city of Orizaba in the Mexican state of Veracruz. It is the northernmost member of the genus Philander.
