= List of shrews and moles described in the 2000s =

This page is a list of species of the order Insectivora discovered in the 2000s. See also parent page List of mammals described in the 2000s.

== Notiosorex cockrumi (2004) ==
In 2004, a new species of desert shrew was identified in Arizona, and named Notiosorex cockrumi. The tiny shrew, which is as light as a penny, is the first new mammal species to be found in Arizona since 1977. It is one of at least four species of the genus Notiosorex.
