= Southeastern four-eyed opossum =

Conservation status
- Least Concern (IUCN 3.1)

Scientific classification
- Kingdom: Animalia
- Phylum: Chordata
- Class: Mammalia
- Infraclass: Marsupialia
- Order: Didelphimorphia
- Family: Didelphidae
- Genus: Philander
- Species: P. frenatus

Binomial name
- Philander frenatus Olfers, 1818
- Geographic range

Species of marsupial

The southeastern four-eyed opossum (Philander frenatus) is an opossum species native to South America. It is found in Atlantic Forest ecoregions, in Brazil, Paraguay and Argentina.

== Description ==
It is a large dark gray opossum. Dorsal fur is dark gray, and the fur on the sides is also gray, but lighter than the dorsal fur. The ventral fur is white or cream-colored. The hairs on the throat have gray bases, but are divided in two by a cream-colored vertical stripe going along the midline of the throat. Its fur is short. Its tail is dark brown or black for its entire length.

== Taxonomy ==
It is considered to be a junior synonym of the gray four-eyed opossum by some sources, such as the Mammal Diversity Database, and the species occupying this range is Philander quica.
