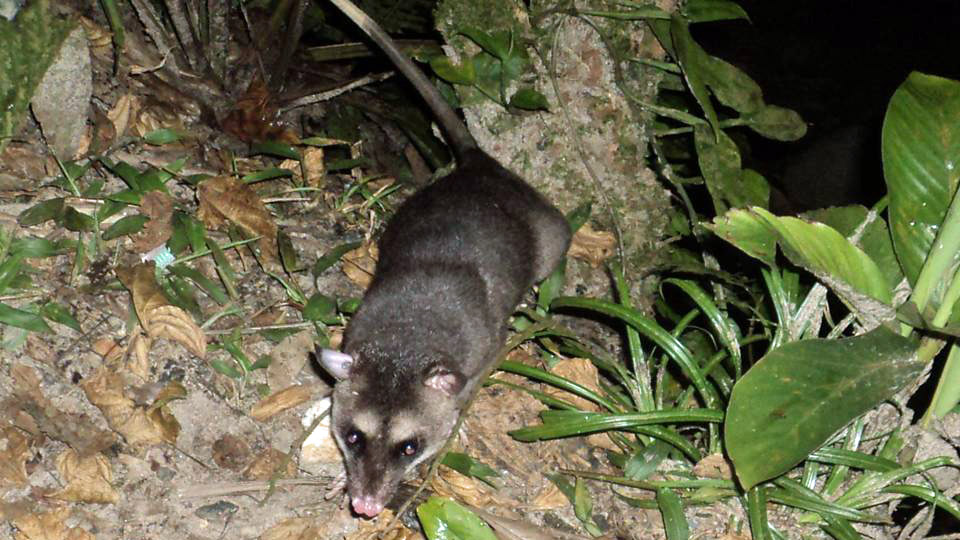
- Philander opossum

Scientific classification
- Domain: Eukaryota
- Kingdom: Animalia
- Phylum: Chordata
- Class: Mammalia
- Infraclass: Marsupialia
- Order: Didelphimorphia
- Family: Didelphidae
- Subfamily: Didelphinae
- Tribe: Didelphini
- Genus: Philander; Brisson, 1762

Type species
- Didelphis opossum Linnaeus, 1758

Species
- Philander andersoni; Philander canus; Philander deltae; Philander frenatus; Philander mcilhennyi; Philander melanurus; Philander mondolfii; Philander nigratus; Philander olrogi; Philander opossum; Philander pebas; Philander quica; Philander vossi

= Gray and black four-eyed opossum =

Gray and black four-eyed opossums

Genus of marsupials

The nine species in the genus Philander, commonly known as gray and black four-eyed opossums, are members of the order Didelphimorphia. Mature females have a well-developed marsupium. The tail appears to be hairless except for the proximal (closest to the body) 5 or 6 cm, which has a few long hairs. The tail is slightly longer than the head-and-body length, and it is black for the proximal one half to two thirds of its length. The genus is closely related to Didelphis but the species of Philander are smaller than those of Didelphis. The genus formerly included Metachirus nudicaudatus, but this species lacks a pouch and so is now considered a separate genus. The common name comes from the white spots above the eyes, which can appear from a distance to be another set of eyes.

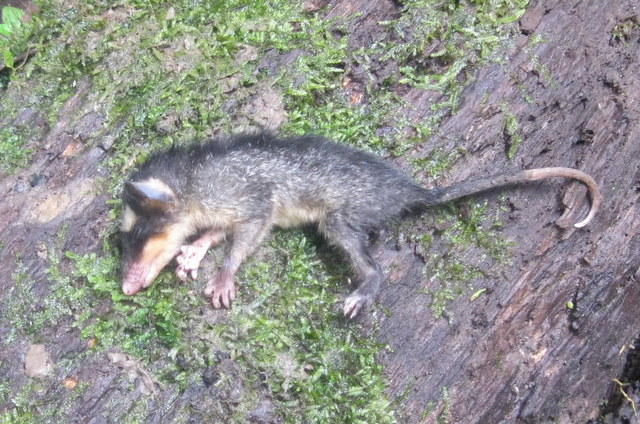
A juvenile Philander andersoni

== Species ==
- Philander andersoni - Anderson's four-eyed opossum
- Philander canus - Common four-eyed opossum
- Philander deltae - Deltaic four-eyed opossum
- Philander mcilhennyi - McIlhenny's four-eyed opossum
- Philander melanurus - Dark four-eyed opossum
- Philander nigratus - Black four-eyed opossum
- Philander opossum - Gray four-eyed opossum
- Philander pebas - Pebas four-eyed opossum
- Philander quica - Southern four-eyed opossum
- Philander vossi - Northern four-eyed opossum

The following three species are recognized by the IUCN and Mammal Species of the World but not by the American Society of Mammalogists. P. frenatus is considered a synonym of Philander opossum, and the latter two are junior synonyms of Philander canus.

- Philander frenatus - Southeastern four-eyed opossum
- Philander mondolfii - Mondolfi's four-eyed opossum
- Philander olrogi - Olrog's four-eyed opossum
