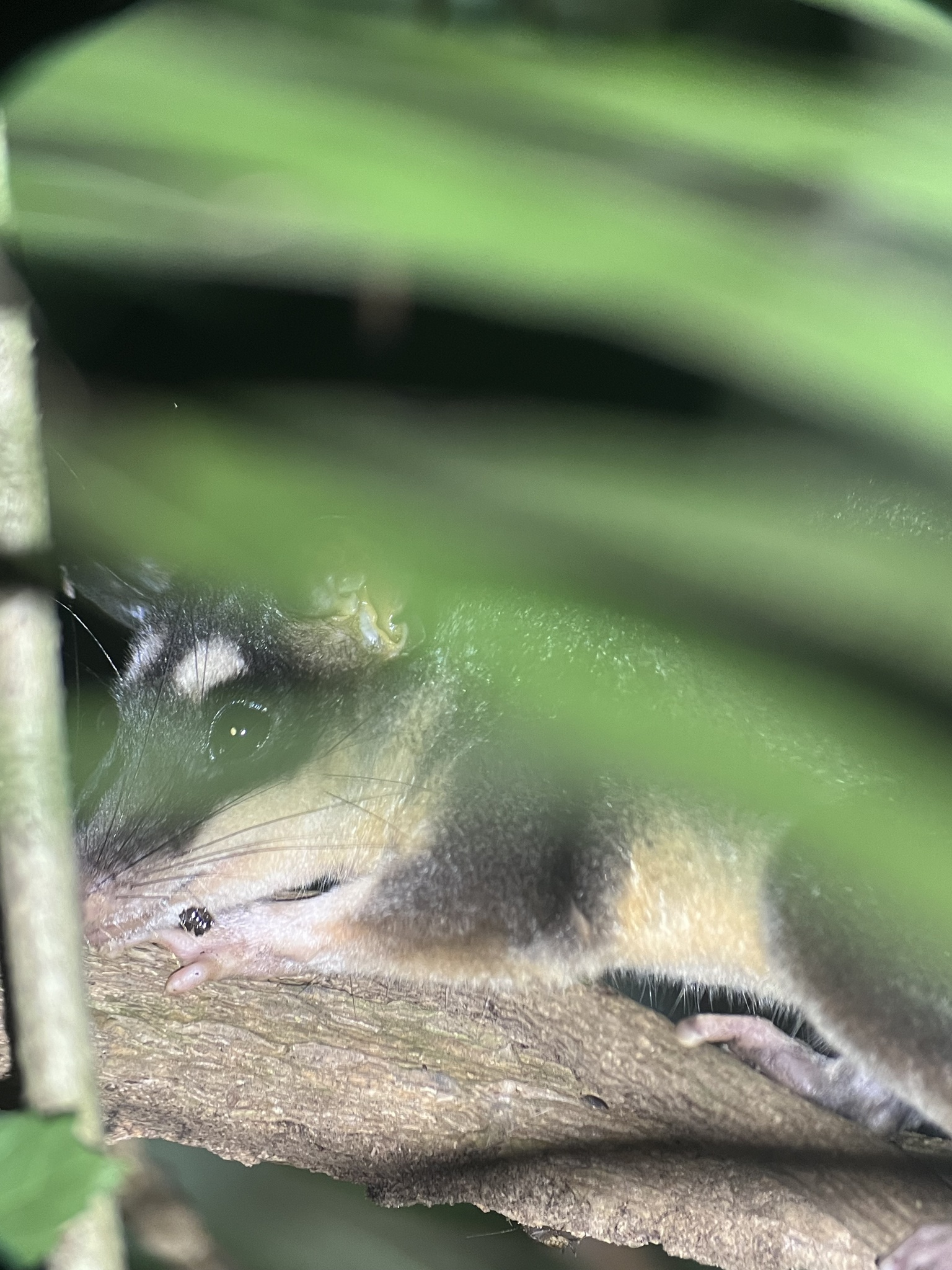

Scientific classification
- Domain: Eukaryota
- Kingdom: Animalia
- Phylum: Chordata
- Class: Mammalia
- Infraclass: Marsupialia
- Order: Didelphimorphia
- Family: Didelphidae
- Genus: Philander
- Species: P. melanurus

Binomial name
- Philander melanurus (O. Thomas, 1899)

Synonyms
- List: Metachirus melanurus O. Thomas, 1899; Didelphis (Metachirops) melanurus (O. Thomas, 1899); Holothylax opossum melanurus (O. Thomas, 1899); Metachirops opossum melanurus (O. Thomas, 1899); Philander opossum melanurus (O. Thomas, 1899); Metachirus fuscogriseus J. A. Allen, 1900; Didelphis (Metachirops) fuscogriseus (J. A. Allen, 1900); Holothylax fuscogriseus (J. A. Allen, 1900); Metachirops opossum fuscogriseus (J. A. Allen, 1900); Philander opossum fuscogriseus (J. A. Allen, 1900); Metachirus grisescens J. A. Allen, 1901; Didelphis (Metachirops) grisescens (J. A. Allen, 1900); Holothylax grisescens (J. A. Allen, 1901); Metachirops opossum grisescens (J. A. Allen, 1901); Metachirus opossum melantho O. Thomas, 1923; Metachirops opossum melantho (O. Thomas, 1923)

= Dark four-eyed opossum =

Species of marsupial

The dark four-eyed opossum (Philander melanurus) is a species of opossum from Central and South America.

== Taxonomy ==
This species was originally described as a subspecies of Philander opossum, and was considered a subspecies until the late 2010s. Some sources, such as GBIF and the IUCN do not recognize this species's validity yet, while others, such as the American Society of Mammalogists, do recognize it as valid. The subspecies Philander opossum fuscogriseus was sometimes recognized as a valid subspecies, but is now considered a junior synonym of P. melanurus. If fuscogriseus would be revalidized, it would include populations in Central America, while the nominate subspecies would be the South American populations. When considered valid the two forms could be differentiated by fuscogriseus having a lighter-tipped tail and lighter fur color on average, while melanurus has a unicolored tail and darker upperparts.

== Etymology ==
The common name "four-eyed opossum" comes from the spots above the eyes of this species looking like another set of eyes. The specific name "melanurus" is derived from the Greek "melas" meaning "black" and "oura" meaning "the tail".

== Description ==
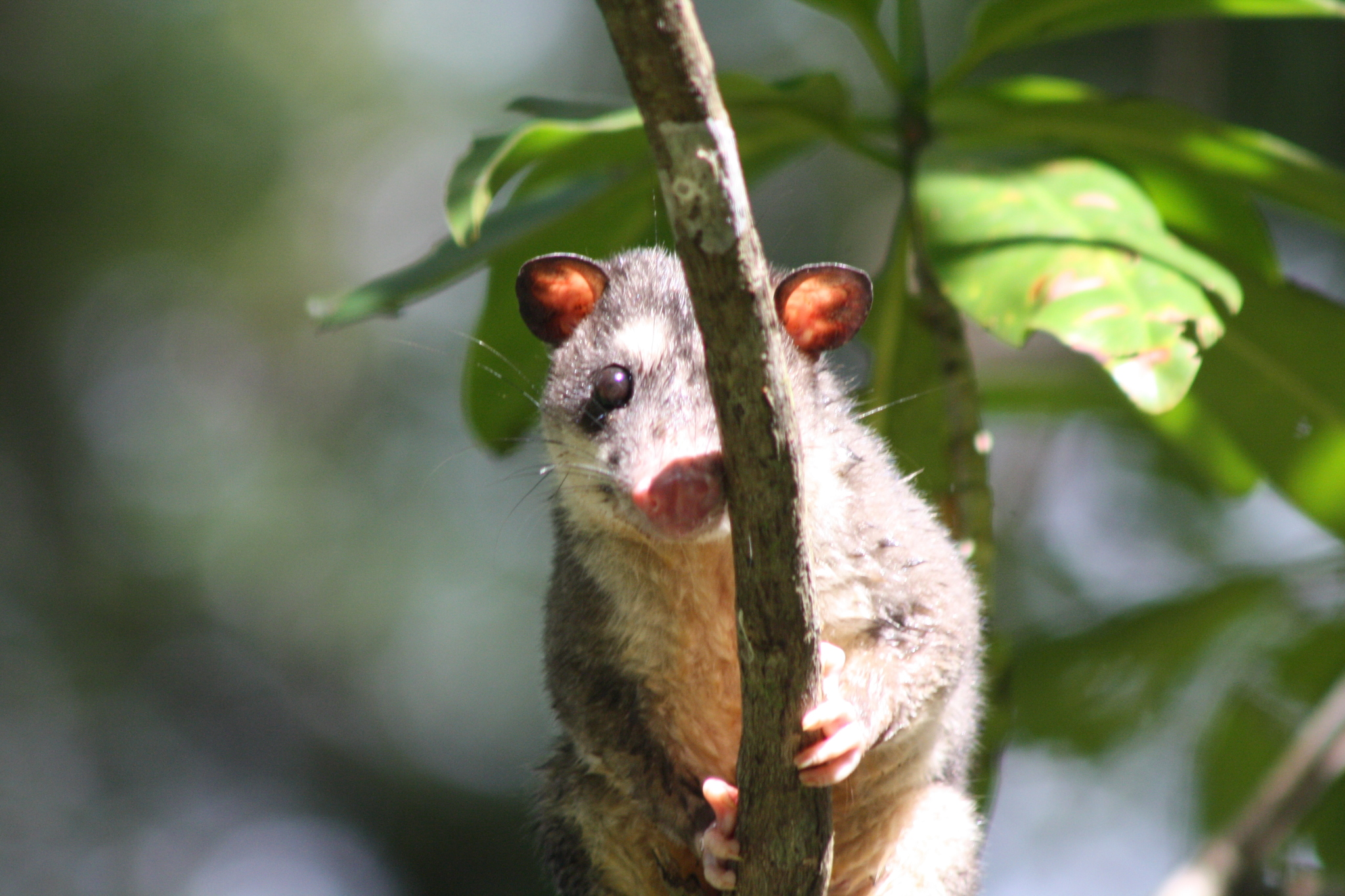
A dark four-eyed opossum in Colombia

This species ranges from 483 to 582 mm (19.0 to 22.9 in), averaging 527 mm (20.7 in). The tail makes up around 258.5 mm (10.18 in) of this length. This species closely resembles the gray four-eyed opossum, but is darker overall, with a usually darker tail. Populations in Central America have a lighter-colored tip of the tail, similar to most Philander opossums, but populations in the southern part of the range have a uniformly dark tail. The upper parts of the head, back, rump, and limbs are a dark gray to black color, with gray-tipped hairs. The sides of the body, the cheeks, and the eyebrows are a yellowish color, and the underside is white. This species is very similar to Philander vossi, but darker overall.

== Range ==
This species is found west of the Andes Mountains in Ecuador, Colombia, and Panama. Either this species or the northern four-eyed opossum occurs in Guatemala, Honduras, Nicaragua, and Costa Rica but more surveying is needed in these regions. As of 2024, no research has been done to find the range border of this species and Philander vossi, but data from the citizen science website iNaturalist indicates it is around the Nicaragua-Costa Rica border. The holotype is from the town of Paramba, along the Río Mira, in northern Ecuador.
