= Mondolfi's four-eyed opossum =

Conservation status
- Least Concern (IUCN 3.1)

Scientific classification
- Kingdom: Animalia
- Phylum: Chordata
- Class: Mammalia
- Infraclass: Marsupialia
- Order: Didelphimorphia
- Family: Didelphidae
- Genus: Philander
- Species: P. mondolfii

Binomial name
- Philander mondolfii Lew, Pérez-Hernández & Ventura, 2006
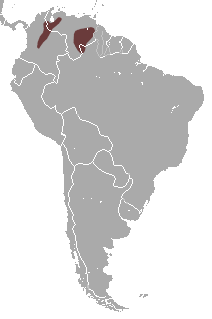
- Mondolfi's four-eyed opossum range

Species of marsupial

Mondolfi's four-eyed opossum (Philander mondolfii) is a South American species of opossum found in Colombia and Venezuela, first described in 2006. It inhabits foothills of the Cordillera de Mérida and those on the eastern side of the Cordillera Oriental at elevations from 50 to 800 m (160 to 2,620 ft). Populations in the two ranges may represent distinct subspecies. It is named after the Venezuelan biologist Edgardo Mondolfi. It has short woolly fur with a pale cream-colored venter as well as large ears pigmented on only the distal half. It is considered to be a junior synonym of the common four-eyed opossum by some sources, such as the Mammal Diversity Database.

== Sources ==
- Lew, D.; Pérez-Hernández, R.; Ventura, J. (April 2006). "Two New Species Of Philander (Didelphimorphia, Didelphidae) From Northern South America". Journal of Mammalogy. 87 (2). American Society of Mammalogists: 224–237. doi:10.1644/05-MAMM-A-065R2.1.
