= Claes Christian Olrog =

Swedish-born ornithologist

Claës Christian Olrog (25 November 1912 – 29 November 1985) was a Swedish-born ornithologist who worked in Argentina. He published Las Aves Argentinas (1959) which was one of the first field guides for Argentina.

Olrog was born in Danderyd, Stockholm and was educated at Uppsala and Stockholm. In 1939 he visited Tierra del Fuego as part of his PhD research. In 1946 he travelled into Paraguay and then took up a teaching position at the Miguel Lillo Institute, in San Miguel de Tucumán, Argentina, in 1948. He published a field guide to the birds of the region in 1959 - Las Aves Argentinas. A new edition was produced in 1984. He described several new taxa and several species have also been named after him.
