= McIlhenny's four-eyed opossum =

Conservation status
- Least Concern (IUCN 3.1)

Scientific classification
- Kingdom: Animalia
- Phylum: Chordata
- Class: Mammalia
- Infraclass: Marsupialia
- Order: Didelphimorphia
- Family: Didelphidae
- Genus: Philander
- Species: P. mcilhennyi

Binomial name
- Philander mcilhennyi Gardner & Patton, 1972
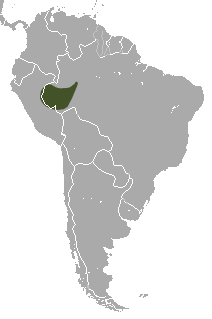
- McIlhenny's four-eyed opossum range

Species of marsupial

McIlhenny's four-eyed opossum (Philander mcilhennyi) is a South American species of opossum. Found in Brazil and Peru, it is almost entirely black, except for white spots above each eye.

This species is named for John Stauffer "Jack" McIlhenny (1909-1997), a grandson of the founder of the McIlhenny Company, maker of Tabasco sauce. He funded the 1968 Louisiana State University expedition that discovered the species.
