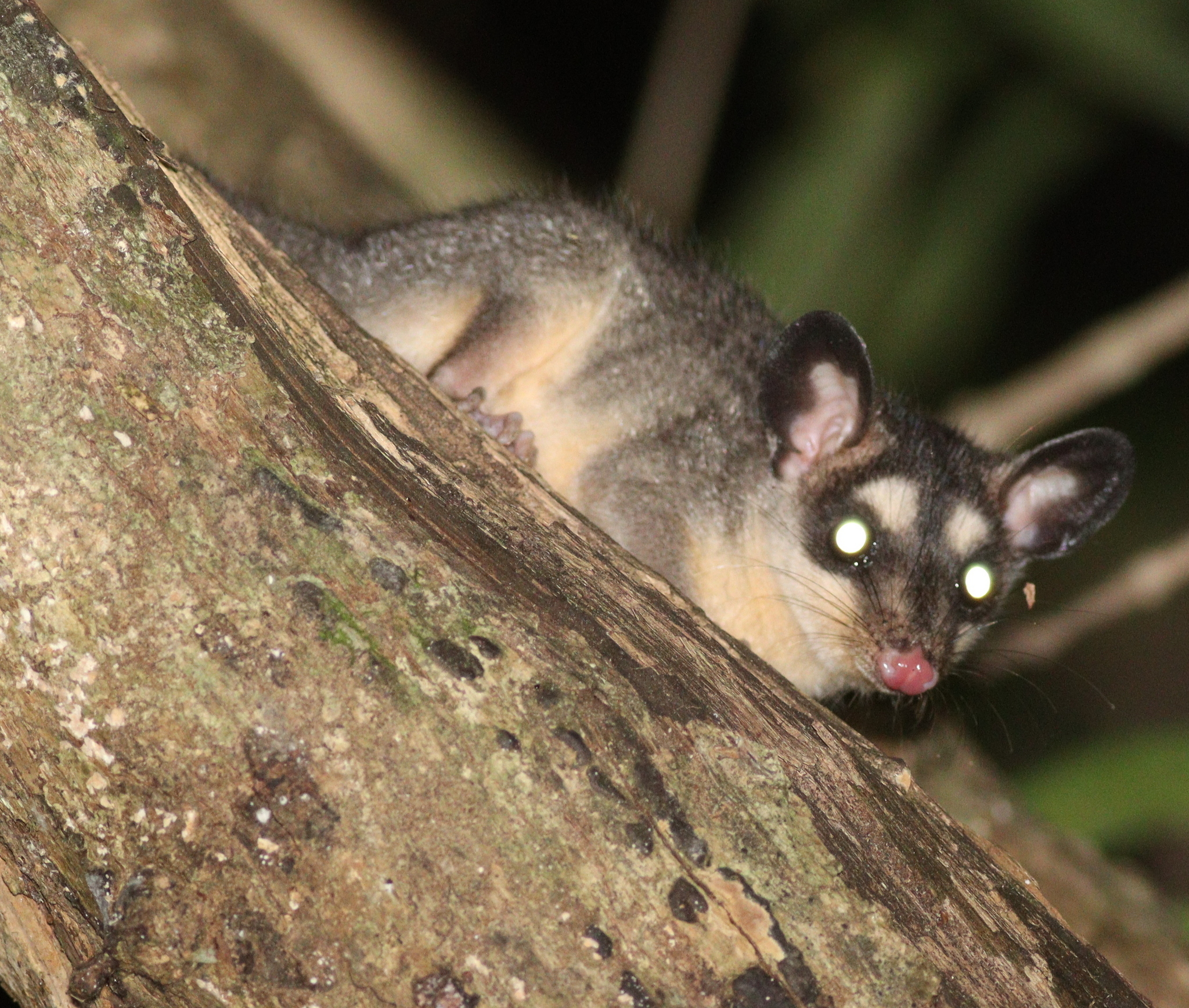

Scientific classification
- Kingdom: Animalia
- Phylum: Chordata
- Class: Mammalia
- Infraclass: Marsupialia
- Order: Didelphimorphia
- Family: Didelphidae
- Genus: Philander
- Species: P. canus

Binomial name
- Philander canus (Osgood, 1913)

Synonyms
- List: Metachirus canus Osgood, 1913; Didelphis (Metachirus) canus (Osgood, 1913); Holothylax grisescens canus (Osgood, 1913); Metachirus opossum crucialis Thomas, 1923; Metachirops opossum canus (Osgood, 1913); Metachirops opossum crucialis (O. Thomas, 1923); Philander opossum canus (Osgood, 1913)

= Common four-eyed opossum =

Species of marsupial

The common four-eyed opossum (Philander canus) is a species of opossum from South America.

== Taxonomy ==
Although this species was initially described as a valid species, it was considered a subspecies of the gray four-eyed opossum until 2018. Some sources, such as the American Society of Mammalogists, consider Philander mondolfii and Philander olrogi to be junior synonyms of this species. It is not recognized by the IUCN.

== Etymology ==
The common name "four-eyed opossum" comes from the spots above the eyes of this species looking like another set of eyes. The specific name "canus" comes from Latin and means "white" or "hoary", in reference to the lighter color of this species.

== Description ==
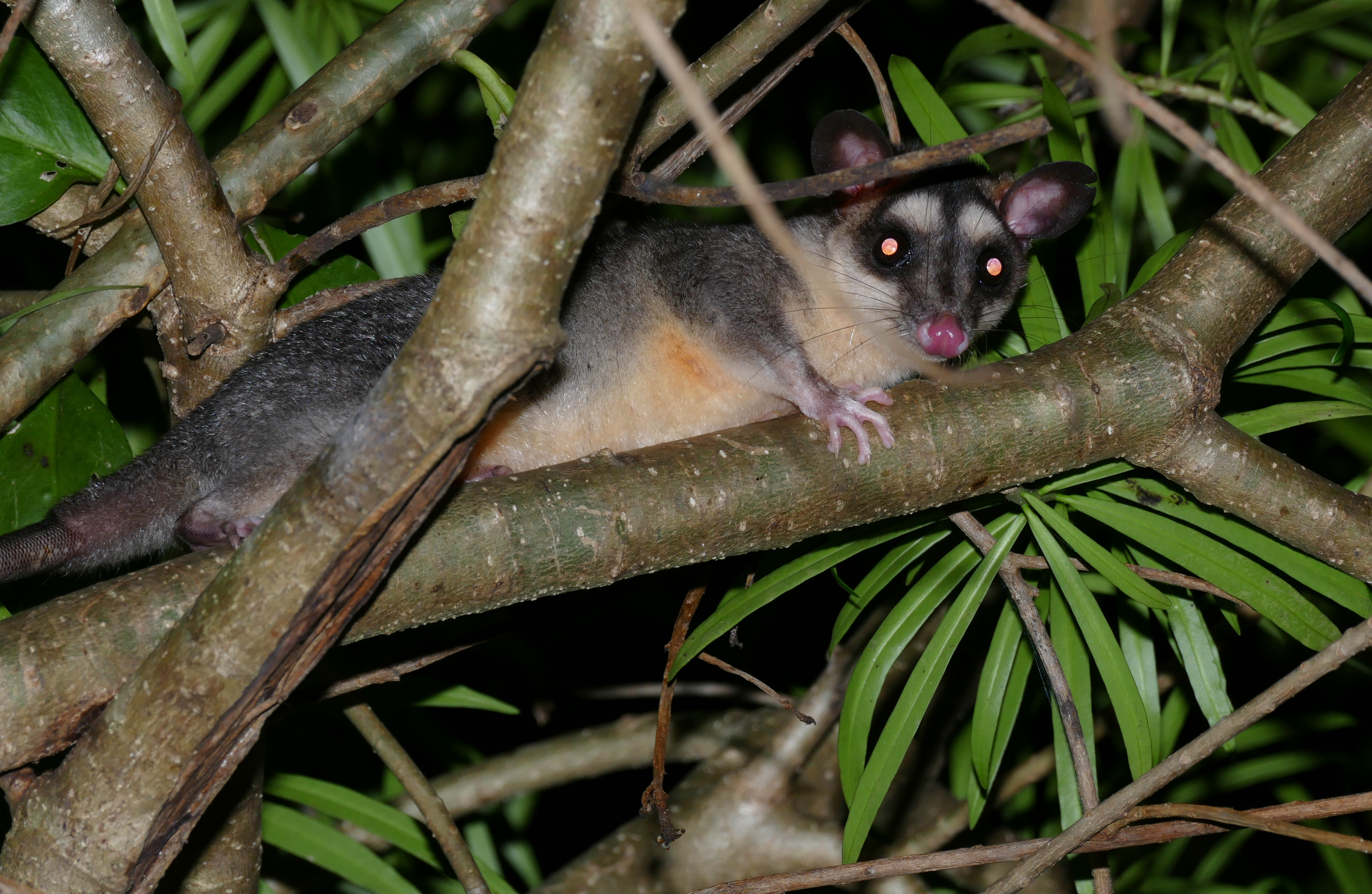
A common four-eyed opossum from Mato Grosso, Brazil

This species has grayish upperparts and buff-colored underparts. The upper parts are silver- and brownish-tipped but grayish overall, and the head is very dark brown. It has two patches of buff above either eye. The underparts are buff-colored near the stomach but whiter near the sides. The tail is bicolored, with the final third being lighter than the basal two-thirds. The toes are white, and the rest of the feet are dark-colored. The species ranges from 500 mm (20 in) to 582 mm (22.9 in), and is on average 526 mm (20.7 in). The tail averages 288 mm (11.3 in).

== Range ==
This species is widespread. It is found in Argentina, Paraguay, Bolivia, Brazil, Peru, Colombia, and Venezuela; it may also occur in Ecuador.

== Habitat ==
This species occurs across a wide variety of habitats. It has been recorded from the Cerrado, Chaco, Pantanal, Llanos, and Amazonia ecoregions. It is likely restricted to gallery forests across the southern part of its range, but has also been recorded from savannas and dry grasslands. In the central and northern parts of its range it can withstand a variety of forest habitats. Where this species is sympatric with other members of the genus Philander, it is unknown if this species occupies the same habitat or is more restricted.
