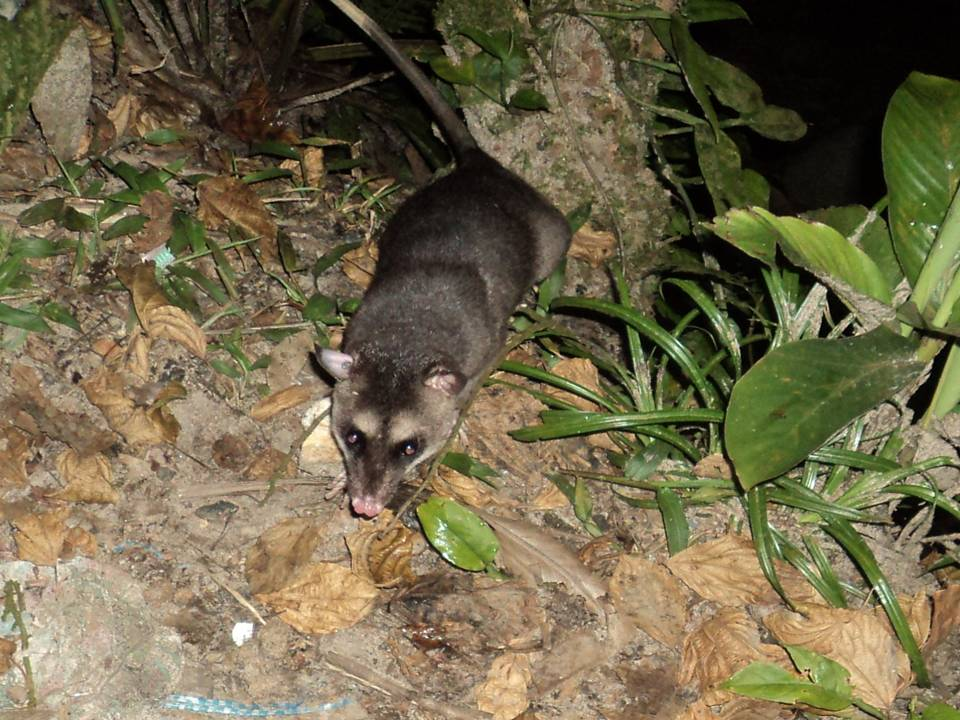

Conservation status
- Least Concern (IUCN 3.1)

Scientific classification
- Kingdom: Animalia
- Phylum: Chordata
- Class: Mammalia
- Infraclass: Marsupialia
- Order: Didelphimorphia
- Family: Didelphidae
- Genus: Philander
- Species: P. opossum

Binomial name
- Philander opossum (Linnaeus, 1758)
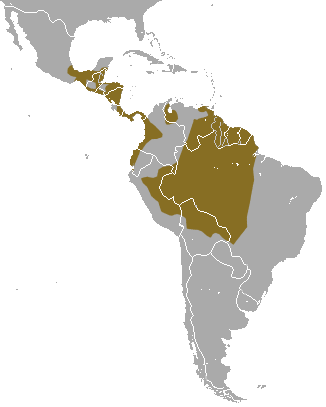
- Gray four-eyed opossum range (but see taxonomy section)

Synonyms
- Didelphis opossum Linnaeus, 1758

= Gray four-eyed opossum =

Species of marsupial

The gray four-eyed opossum (Philander opossum) is an opossum species found in Guyana, Suriname, French Guiana, and northern Brazil, at altitudes from sea level to 1600 m, but generally below 1,000 metres (3,300 ft). Its habitats include primary, secondary and disturbed forest. It is one of many opossum species in the order Didelphimorphia and the family Didelphidae.

== Description ==
It has a sharply defined white spot above each eye, hence the common name. Its prehensile tail is bicolored, with a pale distal part and a longer proximal darker gray part, and is naked at the end. Its dorsal fur is gray, while its ventral fur, throat, and cheeks are cream-colored. Adults have ears that are black except at the base. Wild specimens weigh 200–674 grams (7.1–23.8 oz), while captive specimens can weigh up to 1.5 kilograms (3.3 lb). Body length ranges from 22.0 to 33.1 centimetres (8.7 to 13.0 in) with a tail in a similar size range, 19.5 to 35.5 centimetres (7.7 to 14.0 in).

== Behavior ==
The species is nocturnal, solitary and partly arboreal. It is usually found in moist areas, often near streams, although it wanders in many different vegetation types. It is a good swimmer.

Gray four-eyed opossums do not have a well defined territory, and home range stability depends on the availability of adequate resources. They are omnivorous, feeding on small animals and vegetation, such as leaves, seeds, and fruits.

The gray four-eyed opossum does not "play dead" like the North American Virginia opossum. Instead it is aggressive and fights with potential predators, such as Amazon tree boas, South American bushmasters and possibly common opossums, ocelots, jaguarundis, tayras, grisons, gray foxes, and American barn owls. Some displays of aggression include opening the mouth wide and hissing loudly. It is known to be "the fiercest fighter of the opossums". The gray four-eyed opossum is a nocturnal animal but can be active during the day. Although it is terrestrial, it is very good at climbing and swimming. It has agile and swift movements, and seems more alert than other didelphids.

Gray four-eyed opossums build nests out of dry leaves in hollow trees, tree forks, fallen logs and in ground burrows. They roll up into a ball while sleeping and although their eyes are actually closed, the white patches of fur above their eyes gives them the appearance of an awake animal.

== Reproduction ==
Little is known about gray four-eyed opossums mating habits but they are in the family Didelphidae and so most likely to be polygynous. This means males compete with other males. There are no courtship displays or pair bonds formed in didelphids.

Reproduction is typically seasonal, with more young being born during the rainy season when there is an abundance of fruit. During the dry season, fewer babies are born due to the lack of available fruit. Litter sizes averaging between four and five young, with each female producing between two and four litters per year. Many young die while nursing in the mother's pouch. This death rate is especially high during the dry season. A major factor that determines survival of young is the mother's age; there are many deaths when the mother is less than 11 months.

The average gestation period for the gray four-eyed opossum is 13 to 14 days, and each newborn weighs about 9 grams (0.32 oz). They nurse in their mother's pouch until they are 68 to 75 days old. Once weaned, they stay in their mother's nest for a further 8 to 15 days before their mother becomes aggressive and expels them.

== Diet ==
The gray four-eyed opossum has an omnivorous diet containing fruits, nectar, insects, small mammals (such as mice), birds, reptiles, amphibians, crustaceans, snails, and earthworms. Its diet varies depending on the season.

With such a varied diet, the gray four-eyed opossum will both encounter and eat venomous snakes. While the bites of these snakes may be harmful to most animals, the gray four-eyed opossum is able to overcome the toxic effects due to its immunity to the toxins. The immunity was initially thought to come from an immune response leading to the production of antibodies, but in fact it comes from toxin-neutralizing proteins found in opossum serum. These proteins are produced by the opossum prior to any encounter with a venomous snake, thus this immunity is not learned but inherited.

== Range ==
This species is found throughout the Guianas and eastern Amazonia, in Guyana, Suriname, French Guiana, and Brazil. In Brazil, they are found east of the Rio Negro and the Rio Madeira. It may also occur in Venezuela.

== Taxonomy ==
This species was originally described by Carl Linnaeus in the genus Didelphis. In the 1950s, all members of Philander were either subspecies or synonyms of this species, but various species would be split from this species. In 2018, P. canus, P. melanurus, and P. vossi were split from this species. Philander frenatus is considered a junior synonym of this species.
