= Aquatic mammal =

Mammal that dwells partly or entirely in bodies of water

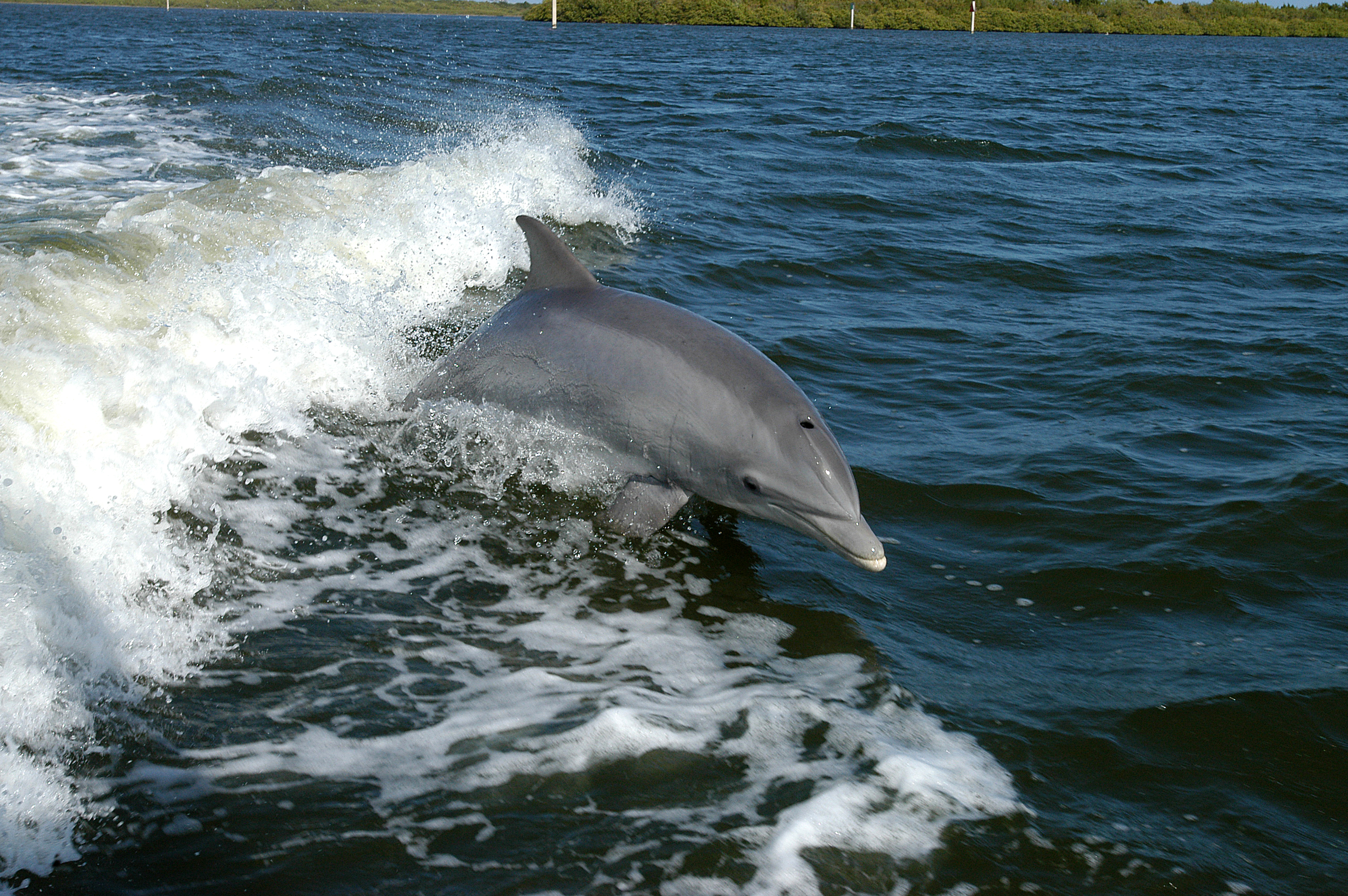
A common bottlenose dolphin (Tursiops truncatus)

Aquatic mammals and semiaquatic mammals are a diverse group of mammals that dwell partly or entirely in bodies of water. They include the various marine mammals who dwell in oceans, as well as various freshwater species, such as the European otter. They are not a taxon and are not unified by any distinct biological grouping, but rather their dependence on and integral relation to aquatic ecosystems. The level of dependence on aquatic life varies greatly among species. Among freshwater taxa, the Amazonian manatee and river dolphins are completely aquatic and fully dependent on aquatic ecosystems. Semiaquatic freshwater taxa include the Baikal seal, which feeds underwater but rests, molts, and breeds on land; and the capybara and hippopotamus which are able to venture in and out of water in search of food.

Mammal adaptation to an aquatic lifestyle vary considerably between species. River dolphins and manatees are both fully aquatic and therefore are completely tethered to a life in the water. Seals are semiaquatic; they spend the majority of their time in the water, but need to return to land for important activities such as mating, breeding and molting. In contrast, many other aquatic mammals, such as hippopotamus, capybara, and water shrews, are much less adapted to aquatic living. Likewise, their diet ranges considerably as well, anywhere from aquatic plants and leaves to small fish and crustaceans. They play major roles in maintaining aquatic ecosystems, beavers especially.

Aquatic mammals were the target for commercial industry, leading to a sharp decline in all populations of exploited species, such as beavers. Their pelts, suited for conserving heat, were taken during the fur trade and made into coats and hats. Other aquatic mammals, such as the Indian rhinoceros, were targets for sport hunting and had a sharp population decline in the 1900s. After it was made illegal, many aquatic mammals became subject to poaching. Other than hunting, aquatic mammals can be killed as bycatch from fisheries, where they become entangled in fixed netting and drown or starve. Increased river traffic, most notably in the Yangtze river, causes collisions between fast ocean vessels and aquatic mammals, and damming of rivers may land migratory aquatic mammals in unsuitable areas or destroy habitat upstream. The industrialization of rivers led to the extinction of the Chinese river dolphin, with the last confirmed sighting in 2004.

== Taxonomy and evolution ==
Aquatic mammals vary greatly in size and shape

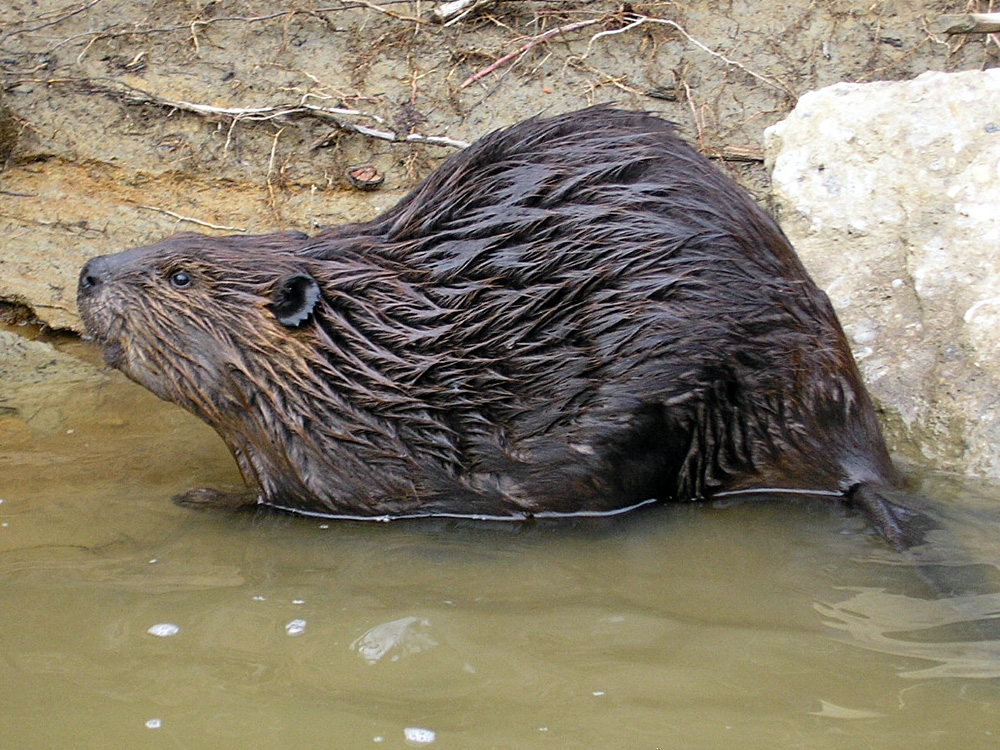
A North American beaver (Castor canadensis)

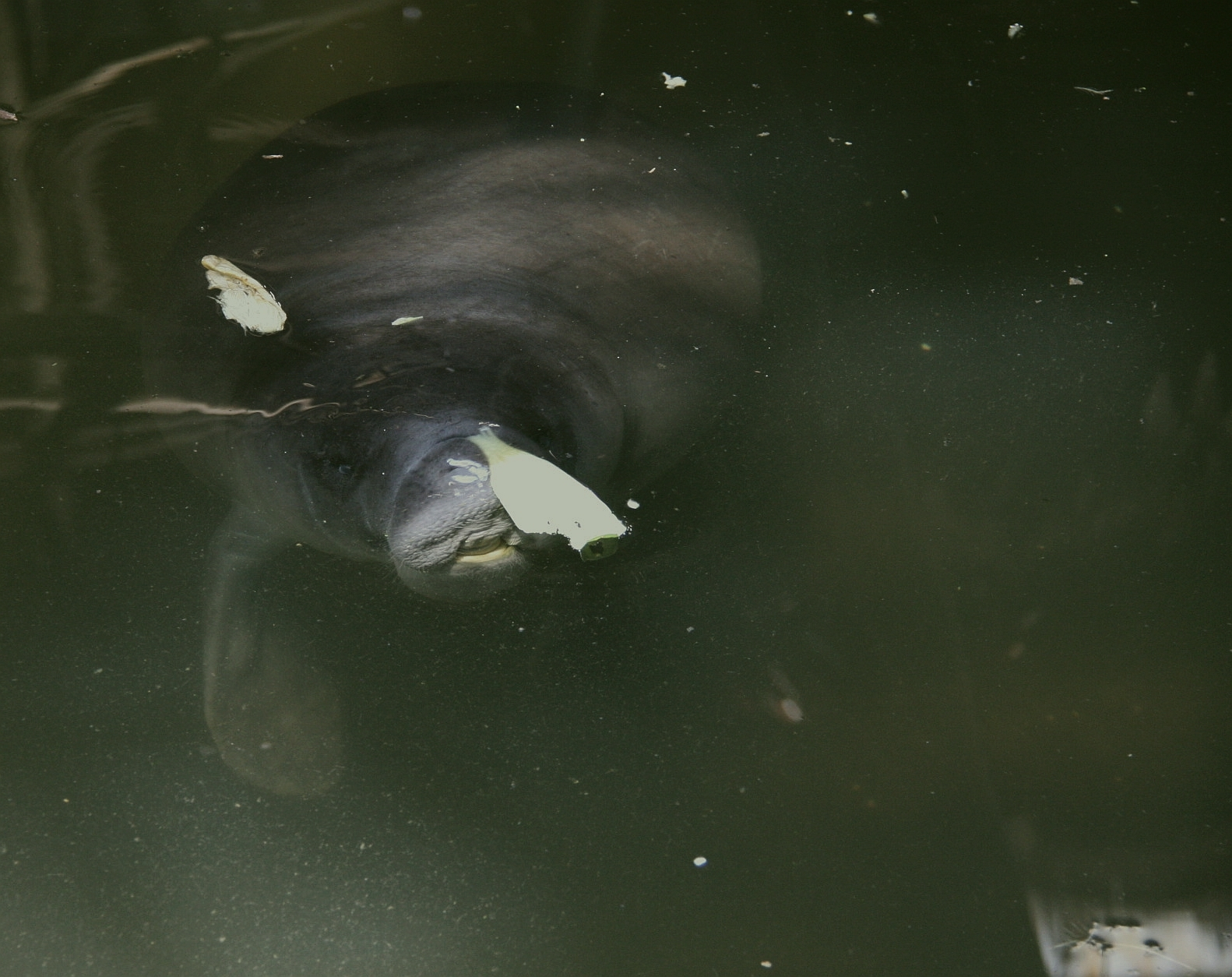
An Amazonian manatee (Trichechus inunguis)

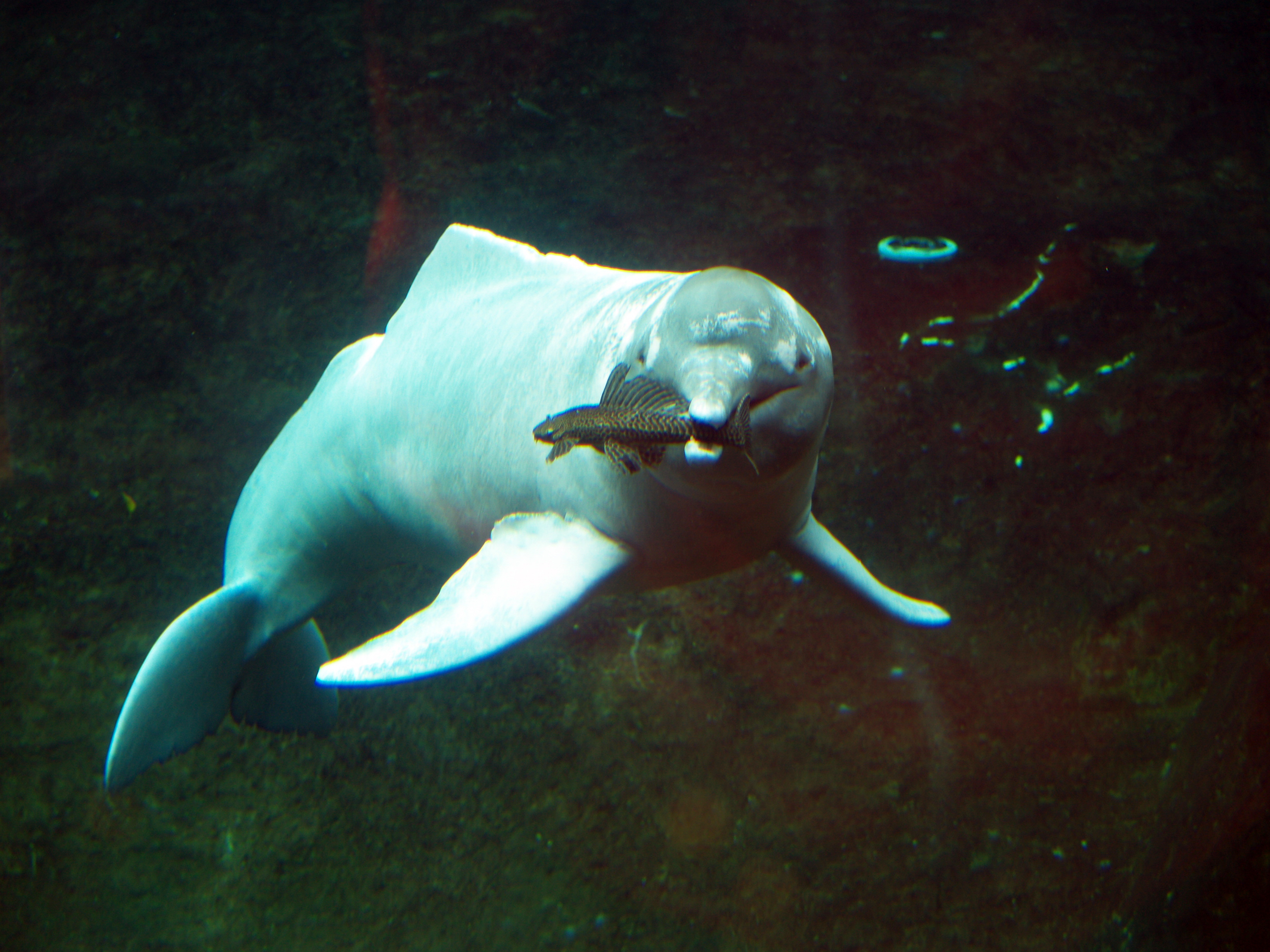
Amazon river dolphin (Inia geoffrensis) at Duisburg Zoo

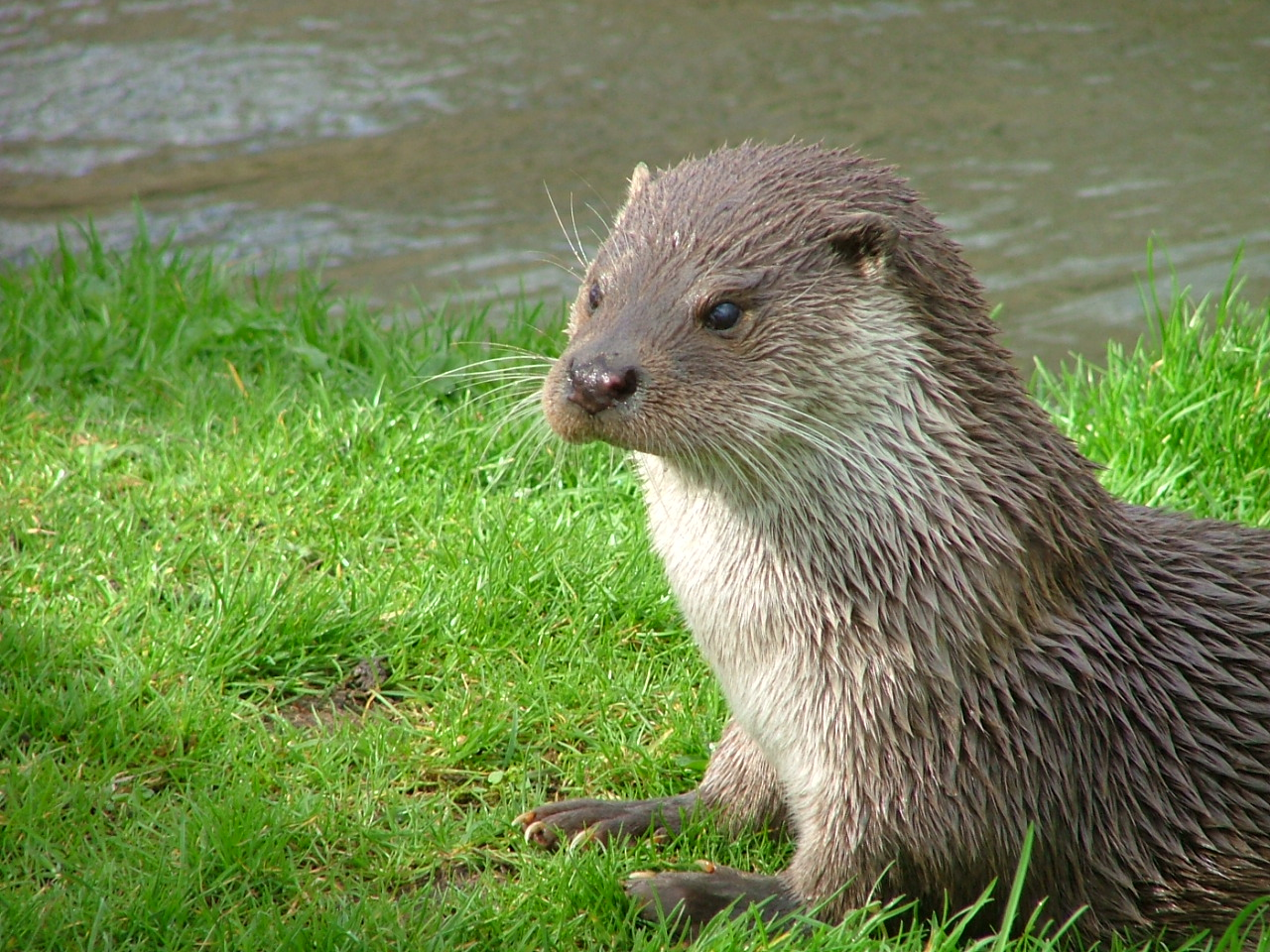
Eurasian otter (Lutra lutra) in Southwold, Suffolk, England

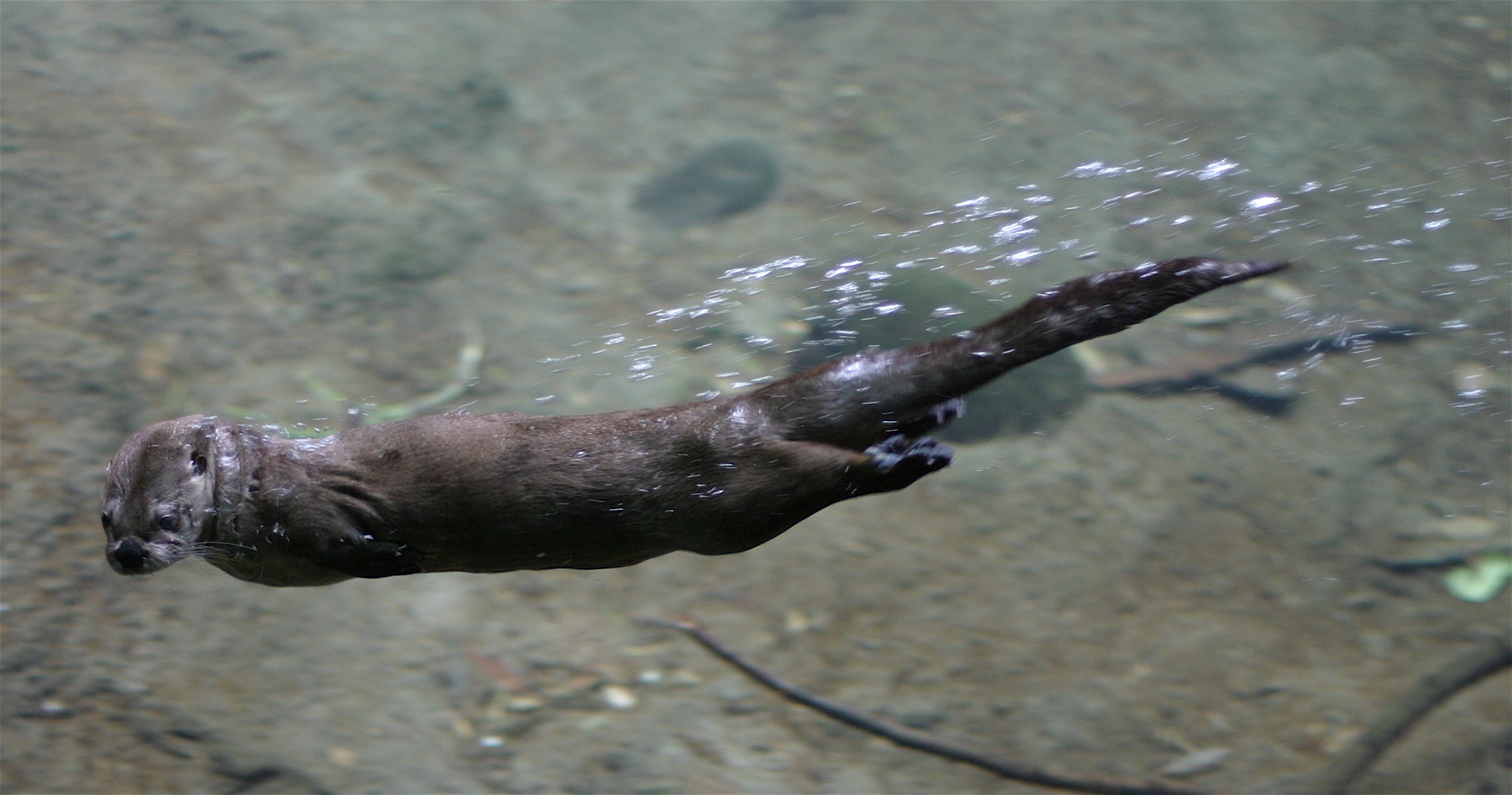
A North American river otter (Lontra canadensis) at the Oregon Zoo

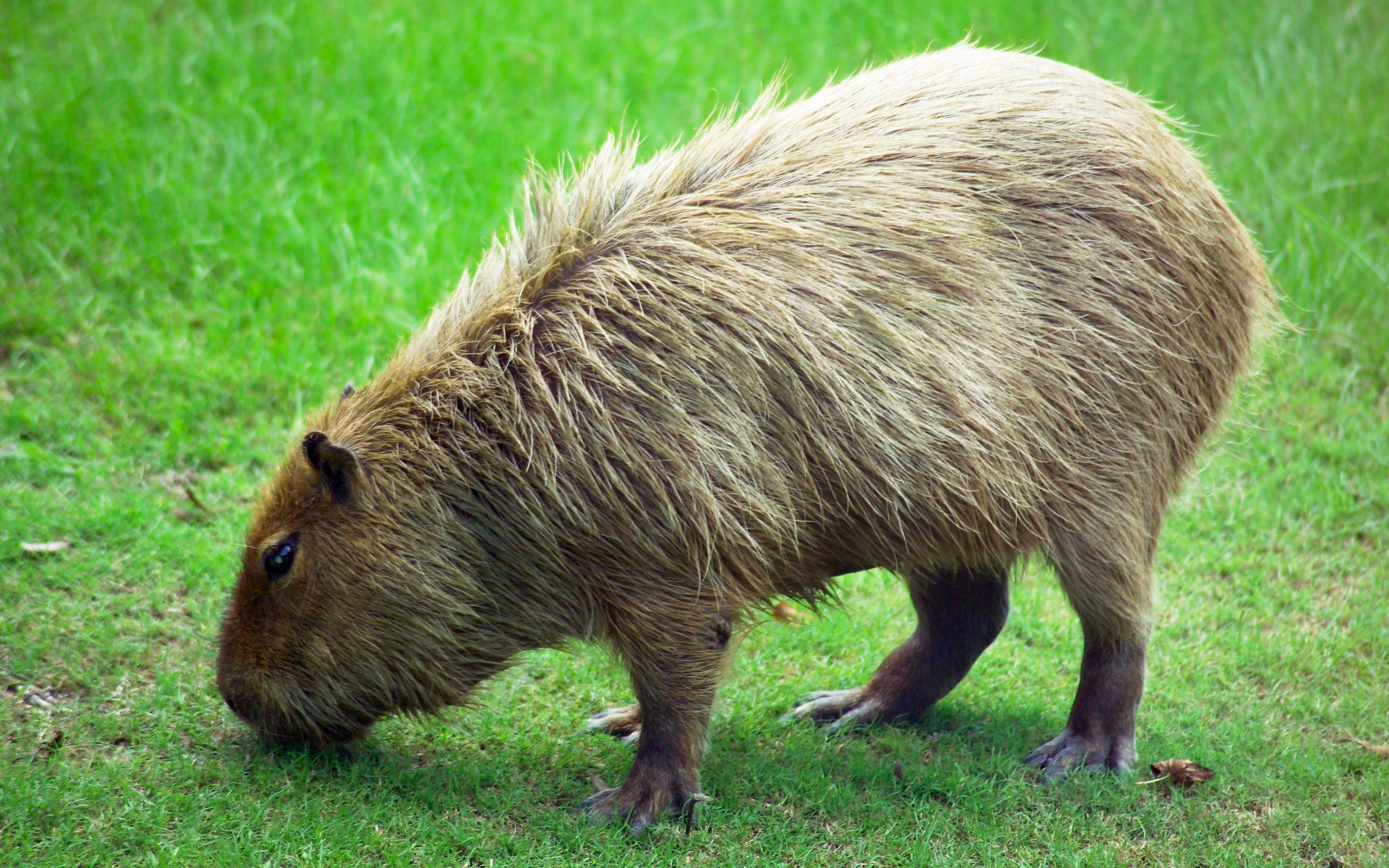
Capybara (Hydrochoerus hydrochaeris)

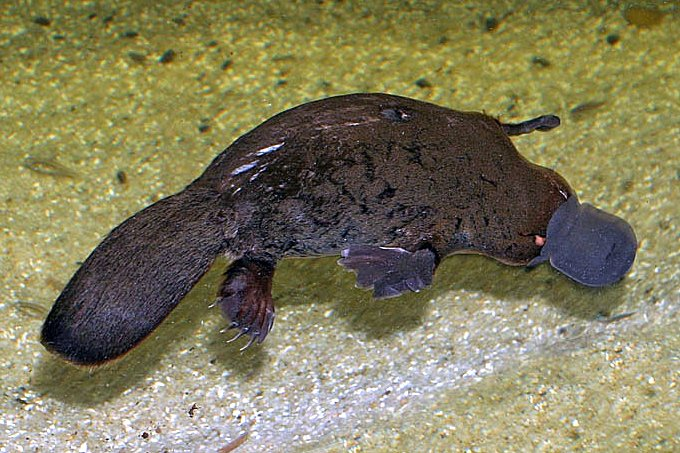
A platypus (Ornithorhynchus anatinus) at the Sydney Aquarium

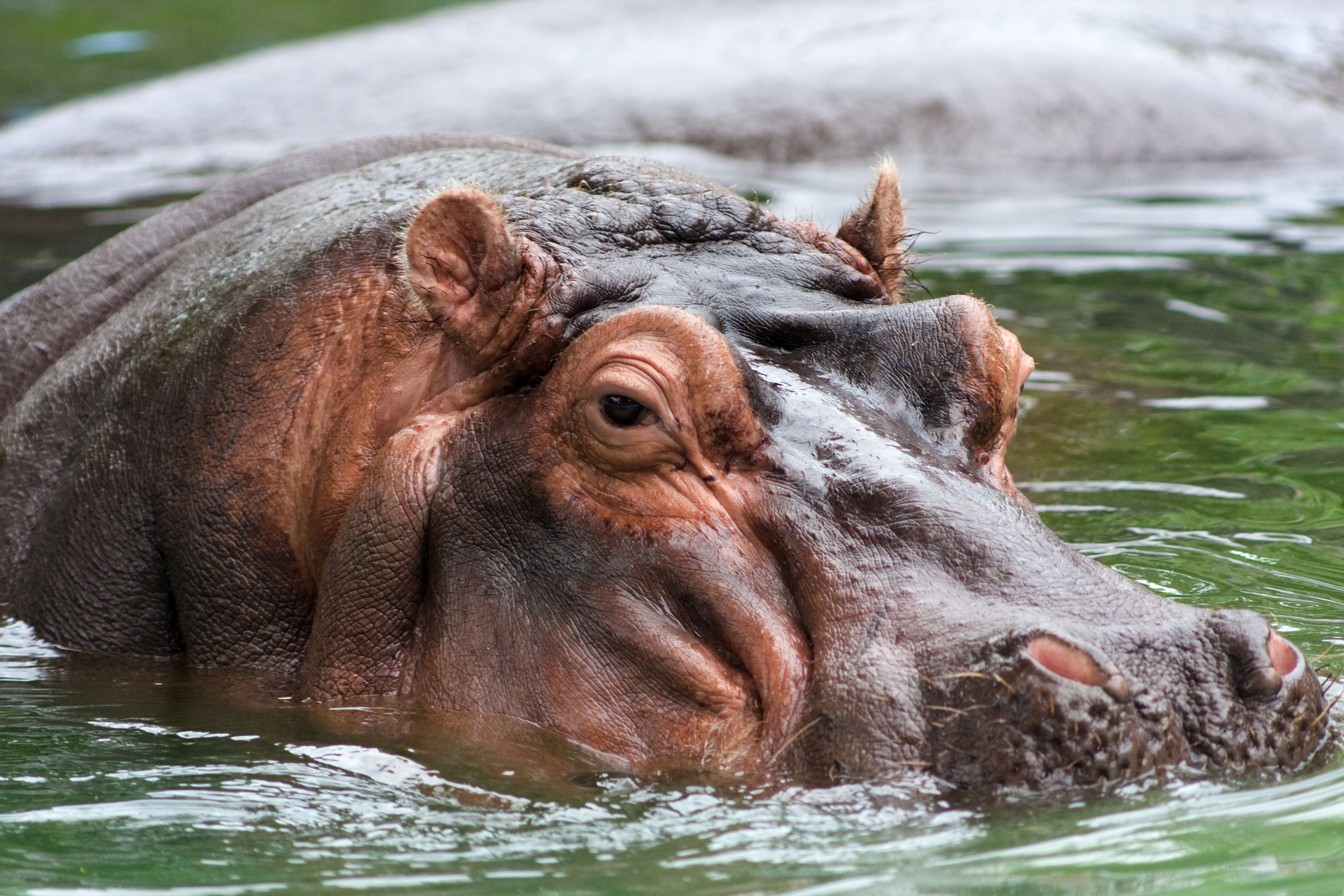
A partially submerged hippopotamus (Hippopotamus amphibius) at the Memphis Zoo

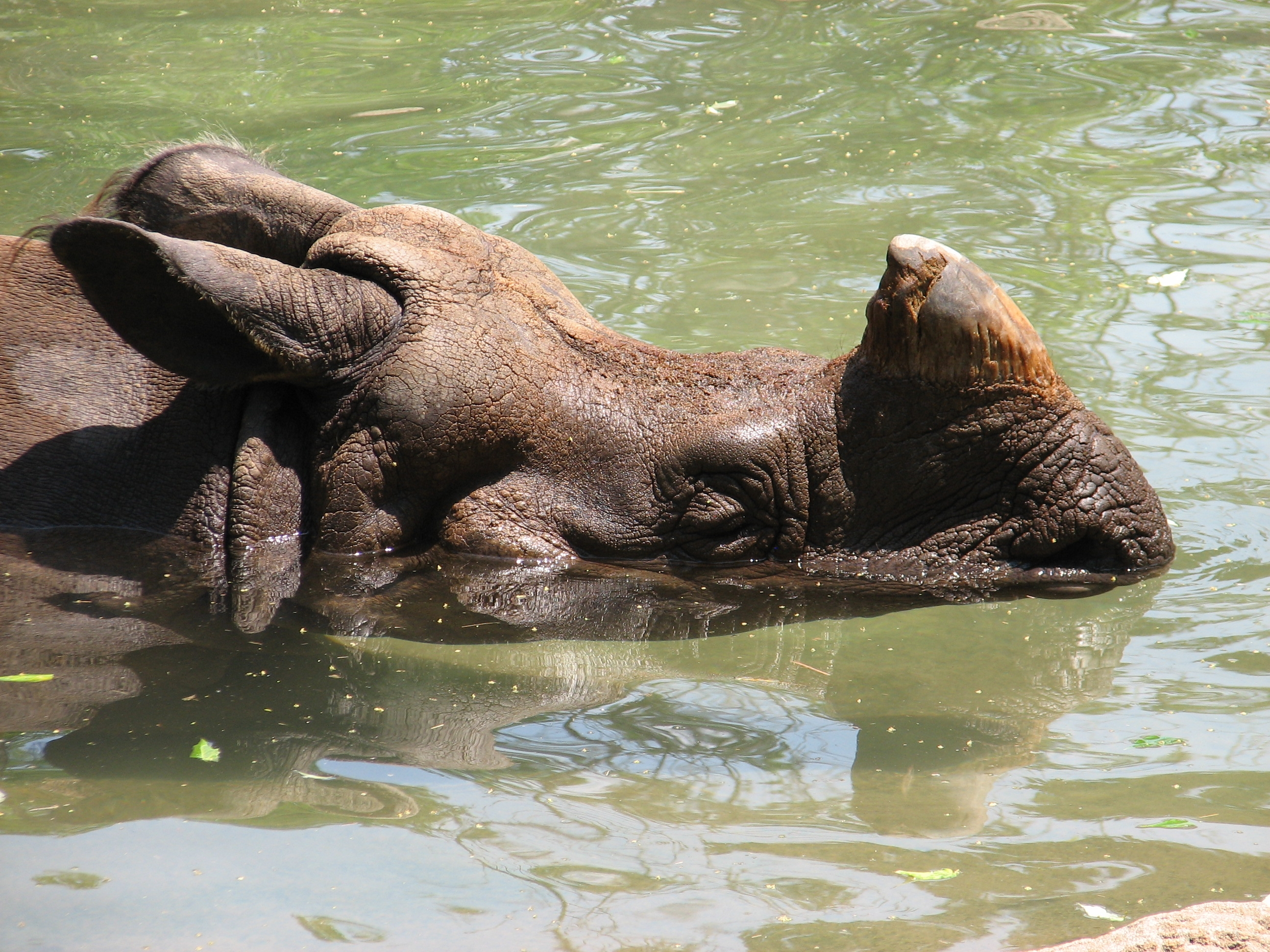
A partially submerged Indian rhinoceros (Rhinoceros unicornis) at the Cincinnati Zoo and Botanical Garden

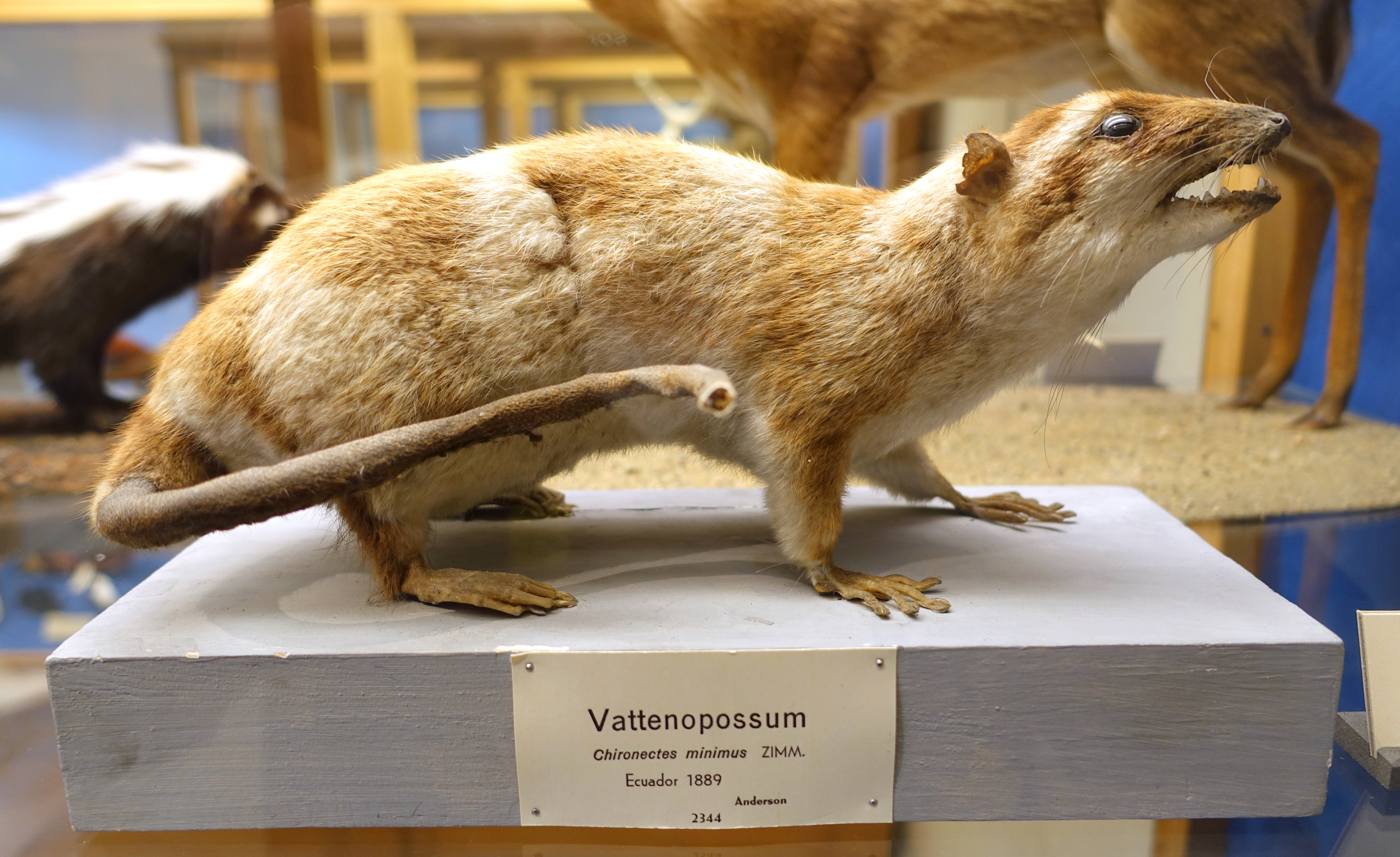
A yapok (Chironectes minimus) taxidermy at the Swedish Museum of Natural History

=== Groups ===
This list covers only mammals that live in freshwater. Although this can include both species that also live in saltwater, or that are members of otherwise marine families. For a list of saltwater mammals, see List of marine mammal species.

- Order Sirenia: sirenians
  - Family Trichechidae: manatees
    - Amazonian manatee (Trichechus inunguis)
    - African manatee (Trichechus senegalensis)
    - West Indian manatee (Trichechus manatus)
- Order Artiodactyla: even-toed ungulates
  - Suborder Whippomorpha
    - Family Platanistidae
      - Ganges river dolphin, or susu (Platanista gangetica)
      - Indus river dolphin, or bhulan (Platanista minor)
    - Family Iniidae
      - Amazon river dolphin, or boto (Inia geoffrensis)
      - Araguaian river dolphin (Inia araguaiaensis)
    - Family Lipotidae
      - Chinese river dolphin, or baiji (Lipotes vexillifer) likely extinct
    - Family Delphinidae
      - Irrawaddy dolphin (Orcaella brevirostris)
      - Tucuxi (Sotalia fluviatilis)
      - Guiana dolphin (Sotalia guianensis)
    - Family Phocoenidae
      - Yangtze finless porpoise (Neophocaena asiaeorientalis)
    - Family Hippopotamidae: hippopotamuses
      - Hippopotamus (Hippopotamus amphibius)
      - Pygmy hippopotamus (Choeropsis liberiensis)
- Order Perissodactyla: odd-toed ungulates
  - Suborder Ceratomorpha
    - Family Rhinocerotidae: rhinoceroses
      - Indian rhinoceros (Rhinoceros unicornis)
- Order Carnivora
  - Family Canidae
    - Bush dog (Speothos venaticus)
  - Family Mustelidae
    - Subfamily Lutrinae
      - Eurasian otter (Lutra lutra)
      - Hairy-nosed otter (Lutra sumatrana)
      - Spotted-necked otter (Hydrictis maculicollis)
      - Smooth-coated otter (Lutrogale perspicillata)
      - North American river otter (Lontra canadensis)
      - Southern river otter (Lontra provocax)
      - Neotropical river otter (Lontra longicaudis)
      - Marine otter (Lontra felina)
      - Giant otter (Pteronura brasiliensis)
      - African clawless otter (Aonyx capensis)
      - Oriental small-clawed otter (Aonyx cinerea)
    - Subfamily Mustelinae
      - European mink (Mustela lutreola)
      - American mink (Neogale vison)
  - Family Phocidae
    - Baikal seal (Pusa sibirica)
    - Ladoga seal (Pusa hispida ladogensis)
    - Saimaa seal (Pusa saimensis)
    - Ungava seal (Phoca vitulina mellonae)
  - Family Otariidae
    - California sea lion (Zalophus californianus)
    - Steller sea lion (Eumetopias jubatus)
  - Family Viverridae
    - Otter civet (Cynogale bennettii)
    - Aquatic genet (Genetta piscivora)
  - Family Herpestidae
    - Marsh mongoose (Atilax paludinosus)
- Order Rodentia: rodents
  - Suborder Hystricomorpha
    - Capybara (Hydrochoerus hydrochaeris)
    - Lesser capybara (Hydrochoerus isthmius)
    - Coypu (Myocastor coypus)
  - Family Castoridae: beavers
    - North American beaver (Castor canadensis)
    - Eurasian beaver (Castor fiber)
  - Family Cricetidae
    - Subfamily Arvicolinae
      - Muskrat (Ondatra zibethicus)
      - Round-tailed muskrat (Neofiber alleni)
      - European water vole (Arvicola amphibius)
      - Southwestern water vole (Arvicola sapidus)
      - North American water vole (Microtus richardsoni)
    - Subfamily Sigmodontinae
      - Ucayali water rat (Amphinectomys savamis)
      - Ecuador fish-eating rat (Anotomys leander)
      - Ferreira's fish-eating rat (Daptomys ferreirai)
      - Musser's fish-eating Rat (Daptomys musseri)
      - Tingo María Fish-eating Rat (Daptomys nunashae)
      - Oyapock's fish-eating rat (Daptomys oyapocki)
      - Peruvian fish-eating rat (Daptomys peruviensis)
      - Venezuelan fish-eating rat (Daptomys venezuelae)
      - Chibchan water mouse (Chibchanomys trichotis)
      - Web-footed marsh rat (Holochilus brasiliensis)
      - Chacoan marsh rat (Holochilus chacarius)
      - Amazonian marsh rat (Holochilus nanus)
      - Brazilian Northeastern Marsh Rat (Holochilus oxe)
      - Common marsh rat, or Amazonian marsh rat (Holochilus sciureus)
      - Crab-eating rat (Ichthyomys hydrobates)
      - Ecuadorean crab-eating rat (Ichthyomys orientalis)
      - Pine's crab-eating rat (Ichthyomys pinei)
      - Pittier's crab-eating rat (Ichthyomys pittieri)
      - Stolzmann's crab-eating rat (Ichthyomys stolzmanni)
      - Tweedy's crab-eating rat (Ichthyomys tweedii)
      - Incan water mouse (Incanomys mayopuma)
      - Incan small-eared water mouse (Icanomys parviauris)
      - Lund's amphibious rat (Lundomys molitor)
      - Western Amazonian nectomys (Nectomys apicalis)
      - Magdalena-Cauca water rat (Nectomys grandis)
      - Trinidad water rat (Nectomys palmipes)
      - Amazonian nectomys (Nectomys rattus)
      - South American water rat (Nectomys squamipes)
      - Montane fish-eating rat (Neusticomys monticolus)
      - Voss' fish-eating rat (Neusticomys vossi)
      - Las Cajas water mouse (Neusticomys orcesi)
      - White-bellied Rice Rat (Oryzomys albiventer)
      - Coues's rice rat (Oryzomys couesi)
      - Nicaraguan rice rat (Oryzomys dimidiatus)
      - Gorgas's rice rat (Oryzomys gorgasi)
      - Marsh rice rat (Oryzomys palustris)
      - Brazilian false rice rat (Pseudoryzomys simplex)
      - Mexican water mouse (Rheomys mexicanus)
      - Goldman's water mouse (Rheomys raptor)
      - Thomas's water mouse (Rheomys thomasi)
      - Underwood's water mouse (Rheomys underwoodi)
      - Argentine swamp rat (Scapteromys aquaticus)
      - Plateau swamp rat (Scapteromys meridionalis)
      - Waterhouse's swamp rat (Scapteromys tumidus)
      - Alfaro's rice water rat (Sigmodontomys alfari)
  - Family Muridae
    - Mountain water rat (Baiyankamys habbema)
    - Shaw Mayer's water rat (Baiyankamys shawmayeri)
    - Earless water rat (Crossomys moncktoni)
    - Rakali, or water-rat (Hydromys chrysogaster)
    - Western water rat (Hydromys hussoni)
    - New Britain water rat (Hydromys neobritannicus)
    - Ziegler's water rat (Hydromys ziegleri)
    - Mangrove mouse, or False water rat (Xeromys myoides)
    - East African wading rat (Colomys goslingi)
    - Cameroonean Wading Rat (Colomys eisentrauti)
    - Wologizi Wading Rat (Colomys wologizi)
    - Congo Wading Rat (Colomys lumumbai)
    - Ethiopian amphibious rat (Nilopegamys plumbeus)
  - Family Thryonomyidae
    - Greater cane rat (Thryonomys swinderianus)
- Order Monotremata: monotremes
  - Platypus (Ornithorhynchus anatinus)
- Order Afrosoricida
  - Family Potamogalidae
    - Giant otter shrew (Potamogale velox)
    - Nimba otter shrew (Micropotamogale lamottei)
    - Ruwenzori otter shrew (Micropotamogale ruwenzorii)
  - Family Tenrecidae
    - Aquatic tenrec (Microgale mergulus)
- Order Eulipotyphla
  - Family Soricidae: shrews
    - Malayan water shrew (Chimarrogale hantu)
    - Himalayan water shrew (Chimarrogale himalayica)
    - Sunda water shrew (Chimarrogale phaeura)
    - Japanese water shrew (Chimarrogale platycephala)
    - Chinese water shrew (Chimarrogale styani)
    - Sumatran water shrew (Chimarrogale sumatrana)
    - Elegant water shrew (Nectogale elegans)
    - Mediterranean water shrew (Neomys anomalus)
    - Eurasian water shrew (Neomys fodiens)
    - Transcaucasian water shrew (Neomys teres)
    - Glacier Bay water shrew (Sorex alaskanus)
    - American water shrew (Sorex palustris)
    - Pacific water shrew, or marsh shrew (Sorex bendirii)
  - Family Talpidae (moles and relatives)
    - Star-nosed mole (Condylura cristata)
    - Russian desman (Desmana moschata)
    - Pyrenean desman (Galemys pyrenaicus)
- Order Didelphimorphia: opossums
  - Family Didelphidae: opossums
    - Big lutrine opossum (Lutreolina crassicaudata)
    - Massoia's lutrine opossum (Lutreolina massoia)
    - Yapok (Chironectes minimus)

=== Evolution ===
==== Mesozoic ====
One of the first known proto-mammals similar to modern placentals was aquatic, the Jurassic mammaliaform Castorocauda. It seems to have been adapted to water much like a beaver, with teeth different in many ways from all other docodonts, presumably due to a difference in diet. Most docodonts had teeth specialized for an omnivorous diet. The teeth of Castorocauda suggest that the animal was a piscivore, feeding on fish and small invertebrates. The first two molars had cusps in a straight row, eliminating the grinding function suggesting that they were strictly for gripping and not for chewing. This feature of three cusps in a row is similar to the ancestral condition in mammal relatives (as seen in triconodonts), but is almost certainly a derived character in Castorocauda. These first molars were also recurved in a manner adapted to hold slippery prey once grasped. These teeth are very similar to the teeth seen in mesonychians, an extinct group of semiaquatic carnivorous ungulates, and resemble, to a lesser degree, the teeth of seals.

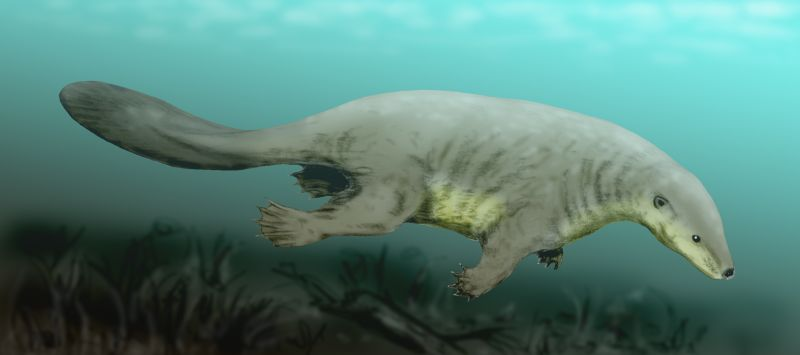
Illustration of Castorocauda lutrasimilis, a semiaquatic mammal from the Jurassic

Another docodontan, the Late Jurassic Haldanodon, has been suggested to be a platypus or desman-like swimmer and burrower, being well adapted to dig and swim and occurring in a wetland environment.

The tritylodontid Kayentatherium has been suggested to be semiaquatic. Unlike Castorocauda and Haldanodon, it was an herbivore, being probably beaver or capybara-like in habits.

Another lineage of Mesozoic mammals, the eutriconodonts, have been suggested to be aquatic animals with mixed results. Astroconodon occurred abundantly in freshwater lacustrine deposits and its molars were originally interpreted as being similar to those of piscivorous mammals like cetaceans and pinnipeds; by extension some researchers considered the possibility that all eutriconodonts were aquatic piscivores. However, Zofia Kielan-Jaworowska and other researchers have latter found that the triconodont molars of eutriconodonts were more suited for a carnassial-like shearing action than the piercing and gripping function of piscivorous mammal molars, occluding instead of interlocking, and that Astroconodon's aquatic occurrences may be of little significance when most terrestrial tetrapod fossils are found in lacustrine environments anyway.

However, two other eutriconodonts, Dyskritodon and Ichthyoconodon, occur in marine deposits with virtually no dental erosion, implying that they died in situ and are thus truly aquatic mammals. Nonetheless, Ichthyoconodon may not be aquatic, but instead a gliding mammal. More recently, Yanoconodon and Liaoconodon have been interpreted as semiaquatic, bearing a long body and paddle-like limbs.

A metatherian, the stagodontid Didelphodon, has been suggested to be aquatic, due to molar and skeleton similarities to sea otters.

==== Cenozoic ====
An extinct genus, Satherium, is believed to be ancestral to South American river otters, having migrated to the New World during the Pliocene or early Pleistocene. The South American continent houses the otter genus Lontra: the giant otter, the neotropical river otter, the southern river otter, and the marine otter. The smooth-coated otter (Lutrogale perspicillata) of Asia may be its closest extant relative; similar behaviour, vocalizations, and skull morphology have been noted.

The most popular theory of the origins of Hippopotamidae suggests that hippos and whales shared a common ancestor that branched off from other artiodactyls around 60 million years ago (mya). This hypothesized ancestral group likely split into two branches around 54 mya. One branch would evolve into cetaceans, possibly beginning about 52 mya, with the protowhale Pakicetus and other early whale ancestors collectively known as Archaeoceti, which eventually underwent aquatic adaptation into the completely aquatic cetaceans. The other branch became the anthracotheres, and all branches of the anthracotheres, except that which evolved into Hippopotamidae, became extinct during the Pliocene without leaving any descendants. River dolphins are thought to have relictual distributions, that is, their ancestors originally occupied marine habitats, but were then displaced from these habitats by modern dolphin lineages. Many of the morphological similarities and adaptations to freshwater habitats arose due to convergent evolution; thus, a grouping of all river dolphins is paraphyletic. For example, Amazon river dolphins are actually more closely related to oceanic dolphins than to South Asian river dolphins.

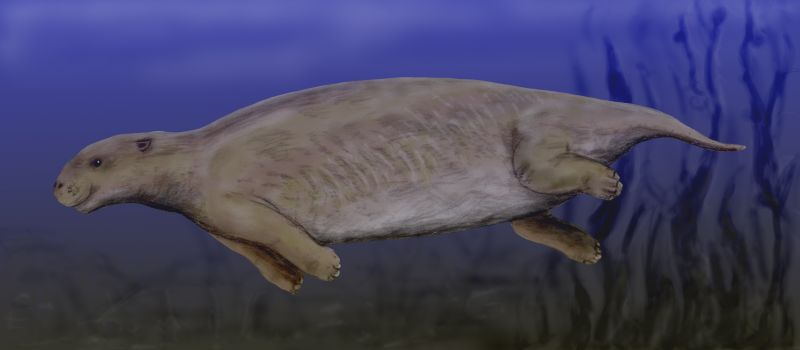
Illustration of Prorastomus, a sirenian from the Eocene

Sirenians, along with Proboscidea (elephants), group together with the extinct †Desmostylia and likely †Embrithopoda to form the Tethytheria. Tethytheria is thought to have evolved from primitive hoofed mammals ("condylarths") along the shores of the ancient Tethys Ocean. Tethytheria, combined with Hyracoidea (hyraxes), forms a clade called Paenungulata. Paenungulata and Tethytheria (especially the latter) are among the least controversial mammalian clades, with strong support from morphological and molecular interpretations. That is, elephants, hyraxes, and manatees share a common ancestry. The ancestry of Sirenia is distinct from that of Cetacea and Pinnipedia, although they are thought to have evolved an aquatic lifestyle around the same time.

The oldest fossil of the modern platypus dates back to about 100,000 years ago, during the Quaternary period. The extinct monotremes Teinolophos and Steropodon were once thought to be closely related to the modern platypus, but more recent studies show that platypodes are more related to the modern echidnas than to these ancient forms and that at least Teinolophos was a rather different mammal lacking several speciations seen in platypodes. However, the last common ancestor between platypodes and echidnas probably was aquatic, and echidnas thus secondarily became terrestrial. Monotrematum sudamericanum is currently the oldest aquatic monotreme known. It has been found in Argentina, indicating monotremes were present in the supercontinent of Gondwana when the continents of South America and Australia were joined via Antarctica, or that monotremes existed along the shorelines of Antarctica in the early Cenozoic.

=== Marine mammals ===
Marine mammals are aquatic mammals that rely on the ocean for their existence. They include animals such as sea lions, whales, dugongs, sea otters and polar bears. Like other aquatic mammals, they do not represent a biological grouping.

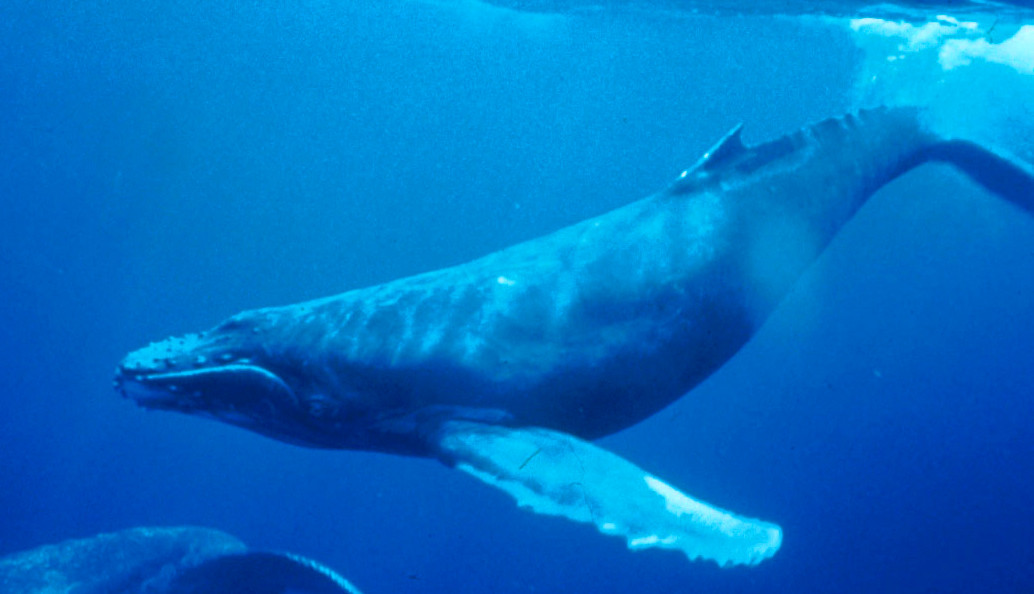
The humpback whale is a fully aquatic marine mammal.

Marine mammal adaptation to an aquatic lifestyle vary considerably between species. Both cetaceans and sirenians are fully aquatic and therefore are obligate ocean dwellers. Pinnipeds are semiaquatic; they spend the majority of their time in the water, but need to return to land for important activities such as mating, breeding and molting. In contrast, both otters and the polar bear are much less adapted to aquatic living. Likewise, their diet ranges considerably as well; some may eat zooplankton, others may eat small fish, and a few may eat other mammals. While the number of marine mammals is small compared to those found on land, their roles in various ecosystems are large. They, namely sea otters and polar bears, play important roles in maintaining marine ecosystems, especially through regulation of prey populations. Their role in maintaining ecosystems makes them of particular concern considering 25% of marine mammal species are currently threatened.

Marine mammals were first hunted by aboriginal peoples for food and other resources. They were also the target for commercial industry, leading to a sharp decline in all populations of exploited species, such as whales and seals. Commercial hunting lead to the extinction of Steller's sea cow and the Caribbean monk seal. After commercial hunting ended, some species, such as the gray whale and northern elephant seal, have rebounded in numbers, however the northern elephant seal has a genetic bottleneck; conversely, other species, such as the North Atlantic right whale, are critically endangered. Other than hunting, marine mammals, dolphins especially, can be killed as bycatch from fisheries, where they become entangled in fixed netting and drown or starve. Increased ocean traffic causes collisions between fast ocean vessels and large marine mammals. Habitat degradation also threatens marine mammals and their ability to find and catch food. Noise pollution, for example, may adversely affect echolocating mammals, and the ongoing effects of global warming degrades arctic environments.

== Adaptations ==
Mammals evolved on land, so all aquatic and semiaquatic mammals have brought many terrestrial adaptations into the waters. They do not breathe underwater as fish do, so their respiratory systems had to protect the body from the surrounding water; valvular nostrils and an intranarial larynx exclude water while breathing and swallowing. To navigate and detect prey in murky and turbid waters, aquatic mammals have developed a variety of sensory organs: for example, manatees have elongated and highly sensitive whiskers which are used to detect food and other vegetation directly front of them, and toothed whales have evolved echolocation.

Aquatic mammals also display a variety of locomotion styles. Cetaceans excel in streamlined body shape and the up-and-down movements of their flukes make them fast swimmers; the tucuxi, for example, can reach speeds of 14 miles per hour (23 km/h). The considerably slower sirenians can also propel themselves with their fluke, but they can also walk on the bottom with their forelimbs. The earless seals (Phocidae) swim by moving their hind-flippers and lower body from side to side, while their fore-flippers are mainly used for steering. They are clumsy on land, and move on land by lunging, bouncing and wiggling while their fore-flippers keep them balanced; when confronted with predators, they retreat to the water as freshwater phocids have no aquatic predators.

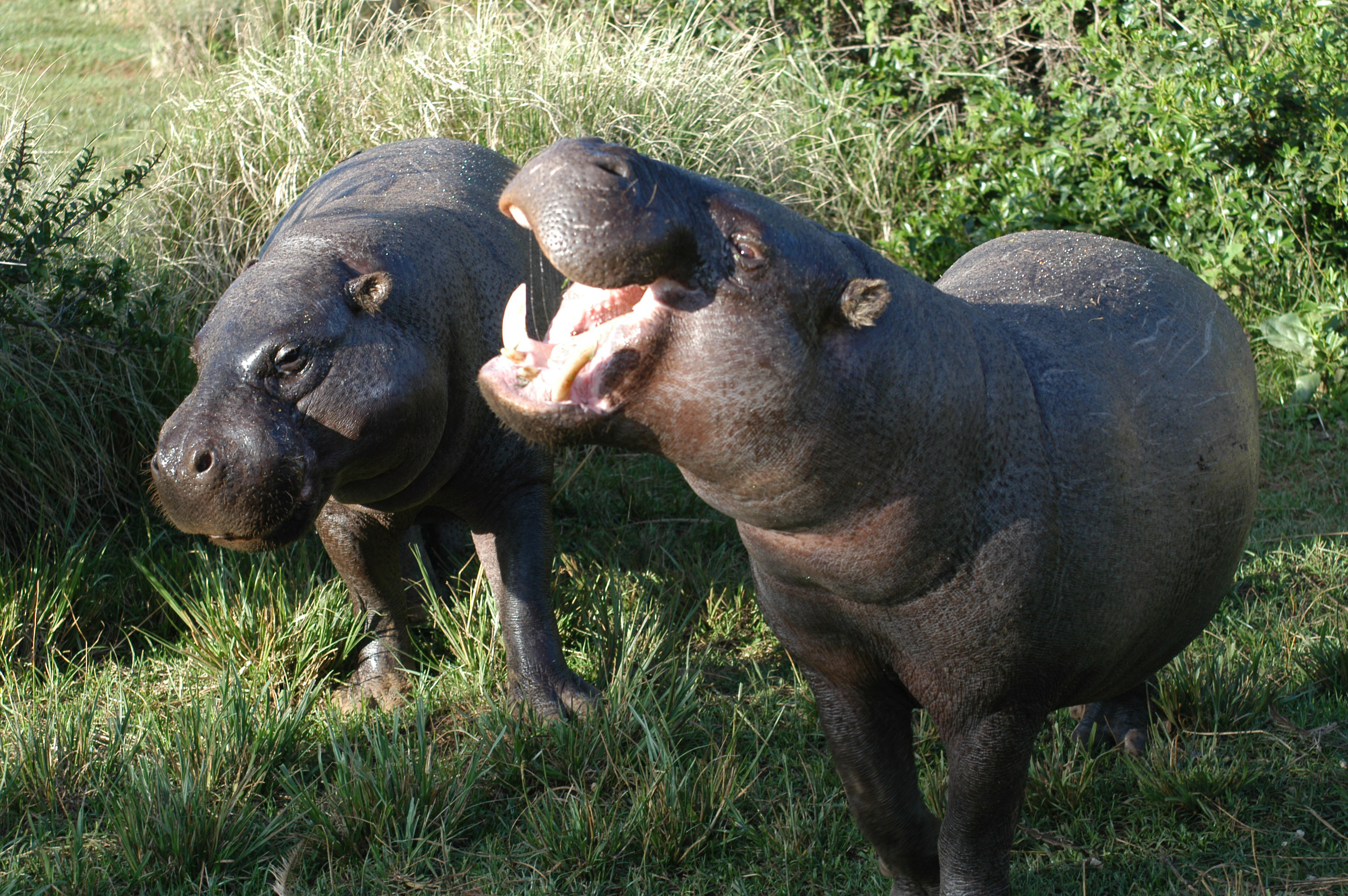
The pygmy hippopotamus has four weight-bearing limbs, and can walk on land like a fully terrestrial mammal.

Some aquatic mammals have retained four weight-bearing limbs (e.g. hippopotamuses, beavers, otters, muskrats) and can walk on land like fully terrestrial mammals. The long and thin legs of a moose limit exposure to and friction from water in contrast to hippopotamuses who keep most of their body submerged and have short and thick legs. The semiaquatic pygmy hippopotamus can walk quickly on a muddy underwater surface thanks to robust muscles and because all toes are weight-bearing. Some aquatic mammals with flippers (e.g. seals) are amphibious and regularly leave the water, sometimes for extended periods, and maneuver on land by undulating their bodies to move on land, similar to the up-and-down body motion used underwater by fully aquatic mammals (e.g. dolphins and manatees).

Beavers, muskrats, otters, and capybara have fur, one of the defining mammalian features, that is long, oily, and waterproof in order to trap air to provide insulation. In contrast, other aquatic mammals, such as dolphins, manatees, seals, and hippopotamuses, have lost their fur in favor of a thick and dense epidermis, and a thickened fat layer (blubber) in response to hydrodynamic requirements.

Wading and bottom-feeding animals (e.g. moose and manatee) need to be heavier than water in order to keep contact with the floor or to stay submerged, surface-living animals (e.g. otters) need the opposite, and free-swimming animals living in open waters (e.g. dolphins) need to be neutrally buoyant in order to be able to swim up and down the water column. Typically, thick and dense bone is found in bottom feeders and low bone density is associated with mammals living in deep water.

The shape and function of the eyes in aquatic animals are dependent on water depth and light exposure: limited light exposure results in a retina similar to that of nocturnal terrestrial mammals. Additionally, cetaceans have two areas of high ganglion cell concentration ("best-vision areas"), where other aquatic mammals (e.g. seals, manatees, otters) only have one.

Among non-placental mammals, which cannot give birth to fully developed young, some adjustments have been made for an aquatic lifestyle. The yapok has a backwards-facing pouch which seals off completely when the animal is underwater, while the platypus lays its eggs on a burrow on land.

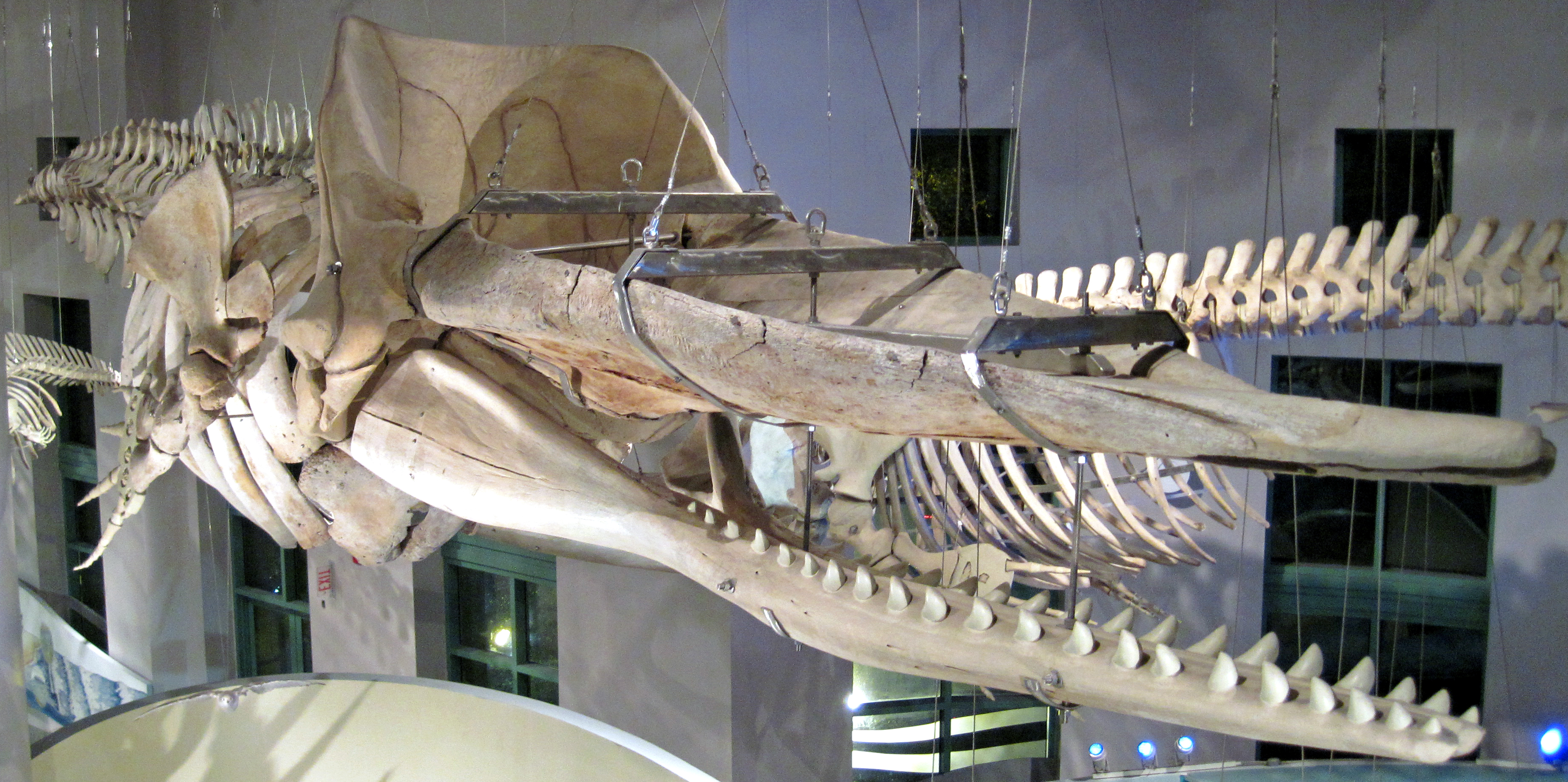
Example of skeletal odontocetes.

Navigation and prey detection systems are also modified. As many aquatic mammals need to hunt at night or in turbid or deep water, their sensory systems have accordingly evolved. For example, certain aquatic mammals can detect vibrations of water from a school of fish swimming for hunting. Odontocetes (toothed whales) developed nasal structures that generate echolocation, enabling them to use sound to locate prey or navigate past obstacles.

== Ecology ==
=== Keystone species ===
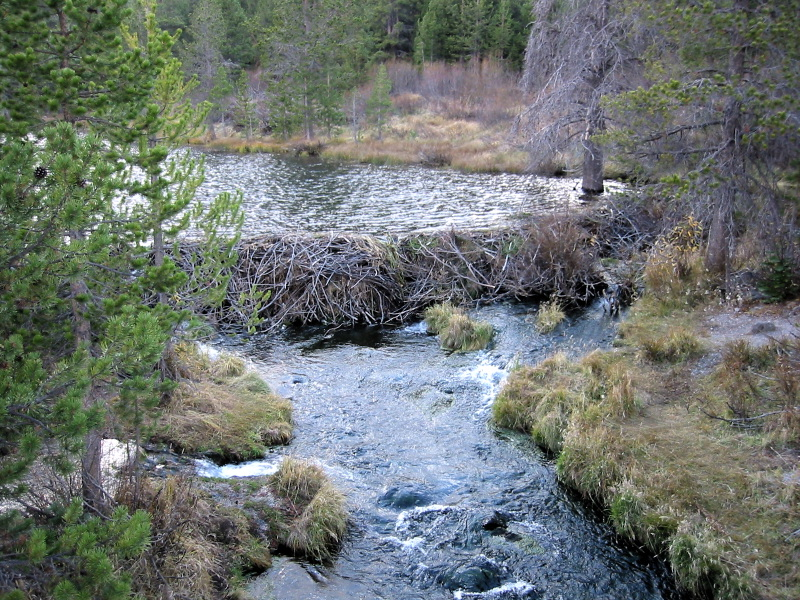
Beaver dams restrict water flow, creating a pond.

Beaver ponds have a profound effect on the surrounding ecosystem. Their first and foremost ecological function is as a reservoir for times of drought, and prevent drying of riverbeds. In the event of a flood, beaver ponds slow down water-flow which reduces erosion on the surrounding soil. Beaver dams hold sediment, which reduces turbidity and thereby improving overall water quality downstream. This supplies other animals with cleaner drinking water and prevents degradation of spawning grounds for fish. However, the slower water speed and lack of shade from trees (that have since been cut down to construct the dam), results in the overall temperature increasing. They also house predatory zooplankton which help break down detritus and control algae populations.

=== Diet ===
Beavers are herbivores, and prefer the wood of quaking aspen, cottonwood, willow, alder, birch, maple and cherry trees. They also eat sedges, pondweed, and water lilies. Beavers do not hibernate, but rather they store sticks and logs in a pile in their ponds, eating the underbark. The dams they build flood areas of surrounding forest, giving the beaver safe access to an important food supply, which is the leaves, buds, and inner bark of growing trees. They prefer aspen and poplar, but will also take birch, maple, willow, alder, black cherry, red oak, beech, ash, hornbeam and occasionally pine and spruce. They will also eat cattails, water lilies and other aquatic vegetation, especially in the early spring.

Indian rhinoceros are grazers. Their diets consist almost entirely of grasses, but they also eat leaves, branches of shrubs and trees, fruits, and submerged and floating aquatic plants. They feed in the mornings and evenings. They use their prehensile lips to grasp grass stems, bend the stem down, bite off the top, and then eat the grass. They tackle very tall grasses or saplings by walking over the plant, with legs on both sides and using the weight of their bodies to push the end of the plant down to the level of the mouth.

Manatees make seasonal movements synchronized with the flood regime of the Amazon Basin. They are found in flooded forests and meadows during the flood season when food is abundant, and move to deep lakes during the dry season. The Amazonian manatee has the smallest degree of rostral deflection (25° to 41°) among sirenians, an adaptation to feed closer to the water surface.

A moose's diet often depends on its location, but they seem to prefer the new growths from deciduous trees with a high sugar content, such as white birch, trembling aspen and striped maple, among many others. They also eat many aquatic plants such as waterlily and water milfoil. To reach high branches, a moose may bend small saplings down, using its prehensile lip, mouth or body. For larger trees a moose may stand erect and walk upright on its hind legs, allowing it to reach plants 14.0 feet (4.26 m) off the ground. Moose are excellent swimmers and are known to wade into water to eat aquatic plants. Moose are thus attracted to marshes and river banks during warmer months as both provide suitable vegetation to eat and water to bathe in. Moose have been known to dive underwater to reach plants on lake bottoms, and the complex snout may assist the moose in this type of feeding. Moose are the only deer that are capable of feeding underwater.

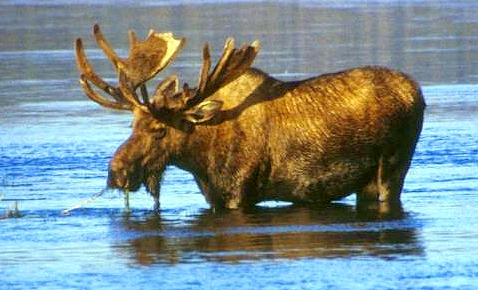
A moose in Siberia feeding on aquatic plants

Hippopotamuses leave the water at dusk and travel inland, sometimes up to 10 km (6 mi), to graze on short grasses, their main source of food. They spend four to five hours grazing and can consume 68 kg (150 lb) of grass each night. Like almost any herbivore, they consume other plants if presented with them, but their diet consists almost entirely of grass, with only minimal consumption of aquatic plants. The pygmy hippopotamus emerges from the water at dusk to feed. It relies on game trails to travel through dense forest vegetation. It marks trails by vigorously waving its tail while defecating to further spread its feces. The pygmy hippo spends about six hours a day foraging for food, and they do not eat aquatic vegetation to a significant extent and rarely eat grass because it is uncommon in the thick forests they inhabit. The bulk of a pygmy hippo's diet consists of ferns, broad-leaved plants and fruits that have fallen to the forest floor. The wide variety of plants pygmy hippos have been observed eating suggests that they will eat any plants available. This diet is of higher quality than that of the common hippopotamus.

The Amazon river dolphin has the most diverse diet among cetaceans, consisting of at least 53 species of fish. They mainly feed on croakers, cichlids, tetras, and piranhas, but they may also target freshwater crabs and river turtles. South Asian river dolphins mainly eat fish (such as carp, catfish, and freshwater sharks) and invertebrates, mainly prawns.

Generally, all aquatic desmans, shrews, and voles make quick dives and catch small fish and invertebrates. The giant otter shrew, for example, makes quick dives that last for seconds and grabs small crabs (usually no bigger than 2.8 inches (7 cm) across). The Lutrine opossum is the most carnivorous opossum, usually consuming small birds, rodents, and invertebrates. Water voles mainly eat grass and plants near the water and at times, they will also consume fruits, bulbs, twigs, buds, and roots. However, a population of water voles living in Wiltshire and Lincolnshire, England have started eating frogs' legs and discarding the bodies.

== Interactions with humans ==
=== Exploitation ===
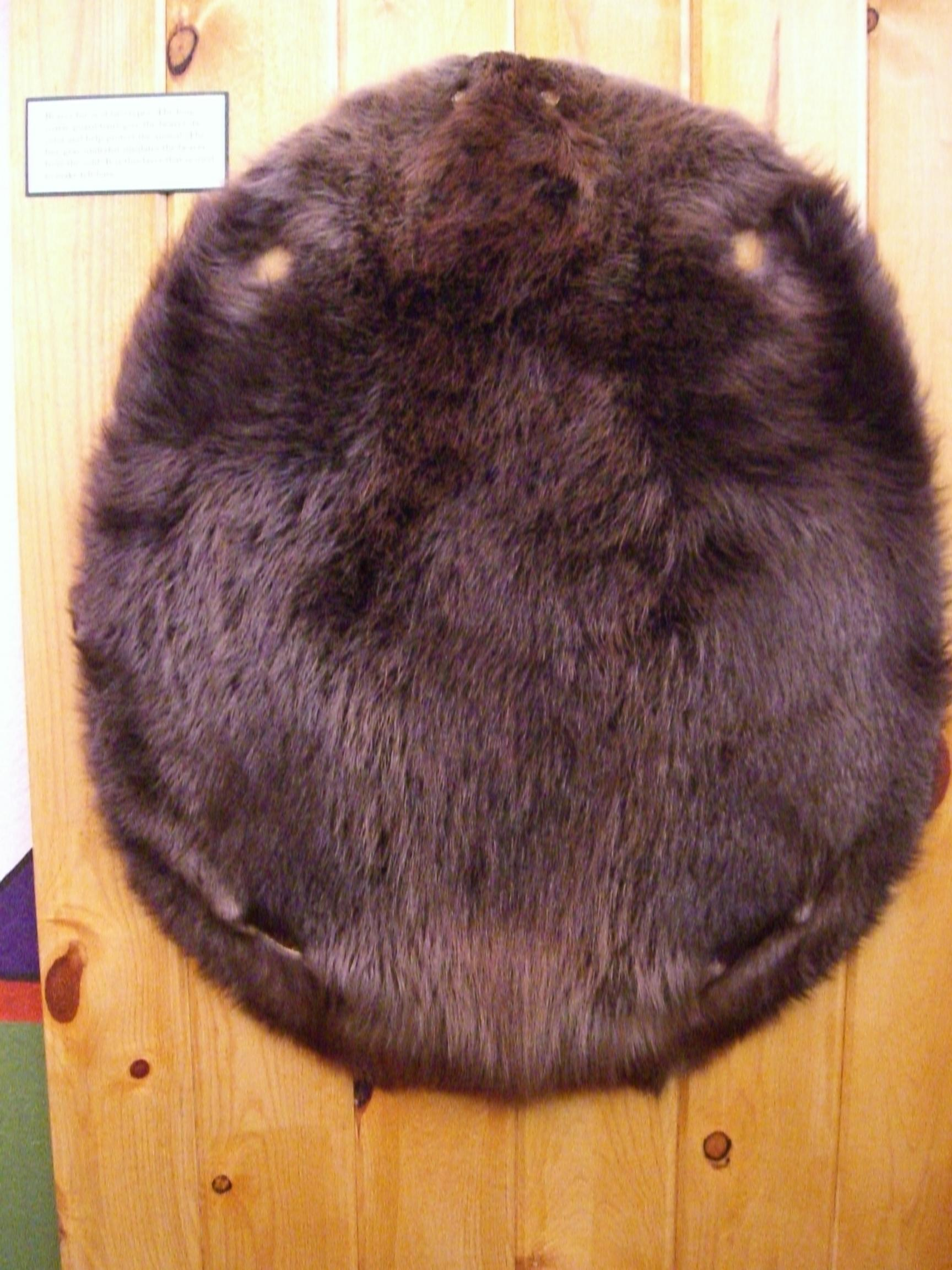
A beaver pelt in the Fur Trade Museum

Fur robes were blankets of sewn-together, native-tanned, beaver pelts. The pelts were called castor gras in French and "coat beaver" in English, and were soon recognized by the newly developed felt-hat making industry as particularly useful for felting. Some historians, seeking to explain the term castor gras, have assumed that coat beaver was rich in human oils from having been worn so long (much of the top-hair was worn away through usage, exposing the valuable under-wool), and that this is what made it attractive to the hatters. This seems unlikely, since grease interferes with the felting of wool, rather than enhancing it. By the 1580s, beaver "wool" was the major starting material of the French felt-hatters. Hat makers began to use it in England soon after, particularly after Huguenot refugees brought their skills and tastes with them from France.

Sport hunting of the Indian rhinoceros became common in the late 1800s and early 1900s. Indian rhinos were hunted relentlessly and persistently. Reports from the middle of the 19th century claim that some British military officers in Assam individually shot more than 200 rhinos. By 1908, the population in Kaziranga had decreased to around 12 individuals. In the early 1900s, the species had declined to near extinction. Poaching for rhinoceros horn became the single most important reason for the decline of the Indian rhino after conservation measures were put in place from the beginning of the 20th century, when legal hunting ended. From 1980 to 1993, 692 rhinos were poached in India. In India's Laokhowa Wildlife Sanctuary, 41 rhinos were killed in 1983, virtually the entire population of the sanctuary. By the mid-1990s, poaching had rendered the species extinct there. In 1950, Chitwan's forest and grasslands extended over more than 2,600 km^{2} (1,000 sq mi) and were home to about 800 rhinos. When poor farmers from the mid-hills moved to the Chitwan Valley in search of arable land, the area was subsequently opened for settlement, and poaching of wildlife became rampant. The Chitwan population has repeatedly been jeopardized by poaching; in 2002 alone, poachers killed 37 animals to saw off and sell their valuable horns.

Otters have been hunted for their pelts since at least the 1700s. There has been a long history of otter pelts being worn around the world. In China it was standard for the royalty to wear robes made from them. People that were financially high in status also wore them. Otters have also been hunted using dogs, specifically the otterhound. In modern times, TRAFFIC, a joint program of the World Wildlife Fund (WWF) and International Union for Conservation of Nature (IUCN), reported that otters are at serious risk in Southeast Asia and have disappeared from parts of their former range. This decline in populations is due to hunting to supply the demand for skins.

=== Habitat degradation ===
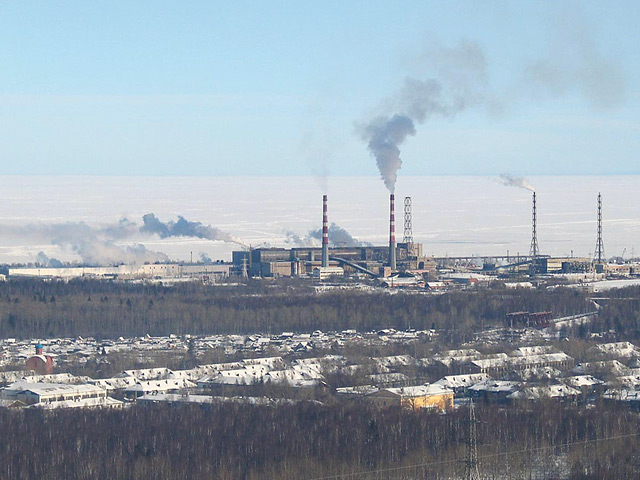
The Baykalsk Pulp and Paper Mill was a major producer of industrial waste for Lake Baikal.

One problem at Lake Baikal is the introduction of pollutants into the ecosystem. Pesticides such as DDT and hexachlorocyclohexane, as well as industrial waste, mainly from the Baykalsk Pulp and Paper Mill, are thought to have been the cause of several disease epidemics among Baikal seal populations. The chemicals are speculated to concentrate up the food chain and weaken the Baikal seal's immune system, making them susceptible to diseases such as canine distemper and the plague, which was the cause of a serious Baikal seal epidemic that resulted in the deaths of thousands of animals in 1997 and 1999. Baikal seal pups have higher levels of DDT and PCB than known in any other population of European or Arctic earless seal.

In the 1940s, beavers were brought from Canada to the island of Tierra Del Fuego in southern Chile and Argentina, for commercial fur production. However, the project failed and the beavers, ten pairs, were released into the wild. Having no natural predators in their new environment, they quickly spread throughout the island, and to other islands in the region, reaching a number of 100,000 individuals within just 50 years. They are now considered a serious invasive species in the region, due to their massive destruction of forest trees, and efforts are being made for their eradication.

In some European countries, such as Belgium, France, and the Netherlands, the muskrat is considered an invasive pest, as its burrowing damages the dikes and levees on which these low-lying countries depend for protection from flooding. In those countries, it is trapped, poisoned, and hunted to attempt to keep the population down. Muskrats also eat corn and other farm and garden crops growing near water bodies.

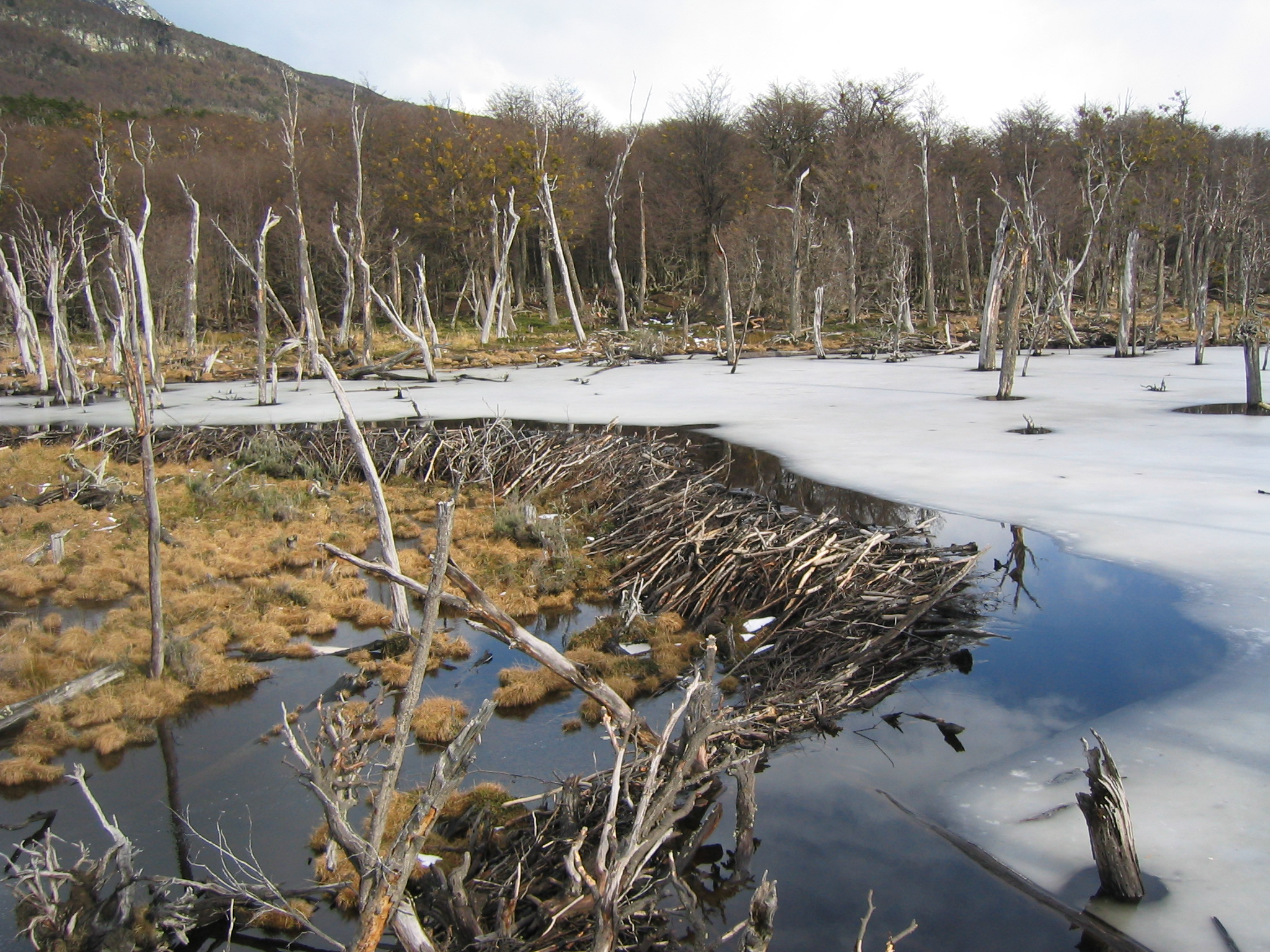
Dead trees as a result of the construction of a beaver dam in Tierra del Fuego

Urban and agricultural development, increased damming, and increased use of hydroelectric power in rivers in countries such as Côte d'Ivoire and Ghana are threats to the African manatee's habitat and life, and thick congestion of boats in waterways may cause them to have a deadly run-in with the vessels. However, even natural occurrences, such as droughts and tidal changes, often strand manatees in an unsuitable habitat. Some are killed accidentally by fishing trawls and nets intended for catching sharks. The Amazonian manatee is at risk from pollution, accidental drowning in commercial fishing nets, and the degradation of vegetation by soil erosion resulting from deforestation. Additionally, the indiscriminate release of mercury in mining activities threatens the entire aquatic ecosystem of the Amazon Basin.

As China developed economically, pressure on the Chinese river dolphin grew significantly. Industrial and residential waste flowed into the Yangtze. The riverbed was dredged and reinforced with concrete in many locations. Ship traffic multiplied, boats grew in size, and fishermen employed wider and more lethal nets. Noise pollution caused the nearly blind animal to collide with propellers. Stocks of the dolphin's prey declined drastically in the late 20th century, with some fish populations declining to one thousandth of their pre-industrial levels. In the 1950s, the population was estimated at 6,000 animals, but declined rapidly over the subsequent five decades. Only a few hundred were left by 1970. Then the number dropped down to 400 by the 1980s and then to 13 in 1997 when a full-fledged search was conducted. On 13 December 2006, the baiji was declared functionally extinct, after a 45-day search by leading experts in the field failed to find a single specimen. The last verified sighting was in 2004.

=== As food ===
Moose are hunted as a game species in many of the countries where they are found. While the flesh has protein levels similar to those of other comparable red meats (e.g. beef, deer and elk), it has a low fat content, and the fat that is present consists of a higher proportion of polyunsaturated fats rather than saturated fats.

...like tender beef, with perhaps more flavour; sometimes like veal"

— Henry David Thoreau of The Maine Woods describing the taste of moose meat

Cadmium levels are high in moose liver and kidneys, with the result that consumption of these organs from moose more than one year old is prohibited in Finland. Cadmium intake has been found to be elevated amongst all consumers of moose meat, though the meat was found to contribute only slightly to the daily cadmium intake. However the consumption of moose liver or kidneys significantly increased cadmium intake, with the study revealing that heavy consumers of moose organs have a relatively narrow safety margin below the levels which would probably cause adverse health effects.

In the 17th century, based on a question raised by the Bishop of Quebec, the Roman Catholic Church ruled that the beaver was a fish (beaver flesh was a part of the indigenous peoples' diet, prior to the Europeans' arrival) for purposes of dietary law. Therefore, the general prohibition on the consumption of meat on Fridays did not apply to beaver meat. This is similar to the Church's classification of other semiaquatic rodents, such as the capybara and muskrat.

== See also ==
- Aquatic animal
- Marine mammal
