= Water mouse =

Water mouse can refer to several types of not closely related semiaquatic rodents of superfamily Muroidea:

- Chibchanomys, two cricetid species from western South America;
  - Las Cajas water mouse (C. orcesi)
  - Chibchan water mouse (C. trichotis)
- Ethiopian water mouse or Ethiopian amphibious rat (Nilopegamys plumbeus), a murid;
- Rheomys, four cricetid species from Central America and Mexico;
  - Mexican water mouse (R. mexicanus)
  - Goldman's water mouse (R. raptor)
  - Thomas's water mouse (R. thomasi)
  - Underwood's water mouse (R. underwoodi)
- Xeromys myoides, a rodent native to Australia and Papua New Guinea
