= Water shrew =

Water shrew may refer to any of several species of semiaquatic red-toothed shrews:

- Asiatic water shrews (Chimarrogale spp.)
  - Malayan water shrew (C. hantu)
  - Himalayan water shrew (C. himalayica)
  - Sunda water shrew (C. phaeura)
  - Japanese water shrew (C. platycephala)
  - Chinese water shrew (C. styani)
  - Sumatran water shrew (C. sumatrana)
- Nectogale
  - Elegant water shrew (N. elegans)
- Neomys
  - Mediterranean water shrew (N. anomalus)
  - Eurasian water shrew (N. fodiens)
  - Transcaucasian water shrew (N. teres)
- Sorex:
  - Glacier Bay water shrew (S. alaskanus)
  - American water shrew (S. palustris)
  - Pacific water shrew or marsh shrew (S. bendirii)
