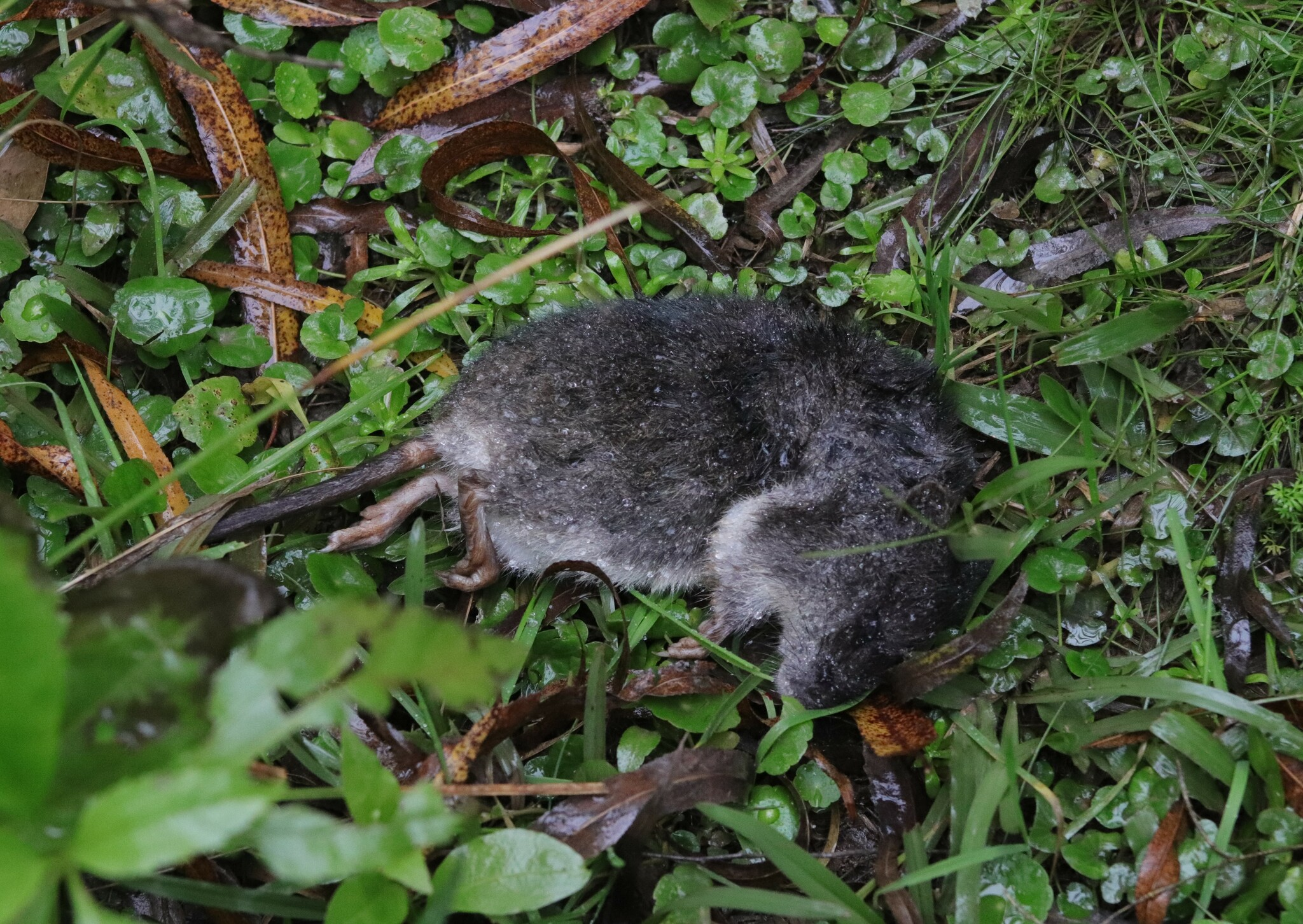
- Scapteromys aquaticus

Scientific classification
- Kingdom: Animalia
- Phylum: Chordata
- Class: Mammalia
- Order: Rodentia
- Family: Cricetidae
- Subfamily: Sigmodontinae
- Tribe: Akodontini
- Genus: Scapteromys; Waterhouse, 1837

Type species
- Mus tumidus Waterhouse, 1837

Species
- Scapteromys aquaticus Scapteromys meridionalis Scapteromys tumidus

= Scapteromys =

Scapteromys Temporal range: Late Pliocene to Recent

Genus of rodents

Scapteromys is a genus of South American rodents in the tribe Akodontini of family Cricetidae. Three species are known, found in northern Argentina, southern Brazil, Paraguay and Uruguay. They are as follows:

- Argentine swamp rat (Scapteromys aquaticus)
- Plateau swamp rat (Scapteromys meridionalis)
- Waterhouse's swamp rat (Scapteromys tumidus)

Species are semiaquatic, living in and near marshes and other bodies of water. They reach a body length of 15 to 20 cm and a tail length of 13–17 cm, and weigh 110-200 g. Fur color is dark gray on top and light gray on the underside. They are primarily crepuscular and nocturnal. Their diet consists mainly of insects; they also consume other invertebrates and plant material.

The three species differ in karyotype, with aquaticus having 2n = 32, tumidus 2n = 24 and meridionalis 2n = 34/36.
