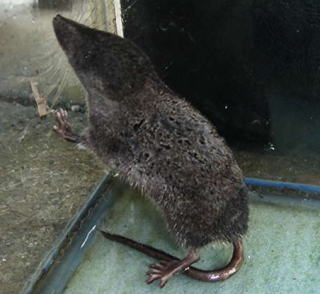

Conservation status
- Least Concern (IUCN 3.1)

Scientific classification
- Kingdom: Animalia
- Phylum: Chordata
- Class: Mammalia
- Order: Eulipotyphla
- Family: Soricidae
- Genus: Chimarrogale
- Species: C. platycephala

Binomial name
- Chimarrogale platycephala (Temminck, 1843)
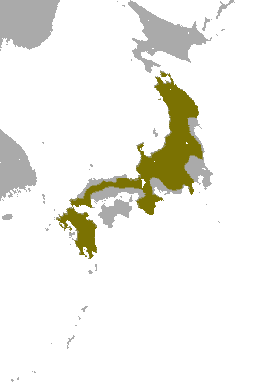
- Japanese water shrew range

Synonyms
- Sorex platycephalus (Temminck, 1843); Galemys platycephalus (A. Pomel, 1848); Chimarrogale platycephala O. Thomas, 1898; Chimarrogale platycephalus Hutterer, 2005

= Japanese water shrew =

Species of mammal

The Japanese water shrew (Chimarrogale platycephala), also called the flat-headed water shrew, is a species of mammal in the family Soricidae. It is endemic to the Japanese islands Honshu and Kyushu. They are considered extinct in Shikoku.

It is known in Japanese as kawa nezumi (カワネズミ; lit. 'river rat').

== Description ==
The Japanese water shrew is a very large shrew with a long tail, although the tail is shorter than the body length. The soft dense fur on the head, back, and sides is grayish black to grayish drab while the underparts are deep olive buff in summer. In winter head, back, and sides are blackish brown while the underparts are whitish. Guard hairs with silvery tips on head, back, and sides give the fur a silvery sheen. The ears are small, concealed in the fur, and (their openings) can be closed. Overall, body and skull are larger in animals from Honshu than from Kyushu and larger in males than in females. Their dental formula is:3.0.2.31.0.2.3 =28.

The Japanese water shrew on Honshu grows to a mean body length (including the head) of 12.5 cm (5 in) for females and 13.2 cm (5 in) for males. Mean tail length varies between 9.8 cm (4 in) for females and 10.3 cm (4 in) for males. Mean body weight ranges between 42.3 g (1 oz) for females and 49.3 g (2 oz) for males. These measurements are based on 80 animals (41 females and 39 males).

Water shrews on Kyushu seem to be overall smaller, but the following numbers have to be assessd critically considering that they are based on measurements of only 7 animals (1 female and 6 males). The only female measured had a body length of 11.2 cm (4 in) with a tail length of 8.2 cm (3 in). Her body weight was 25.0 g (1 oz). Male water shrews on Kyushu have a mean body length of 11.8 cm (5 in) and a mean tail length of 8.7 cm (3 in). Their mean body weight is 34.5 g (1 oz).

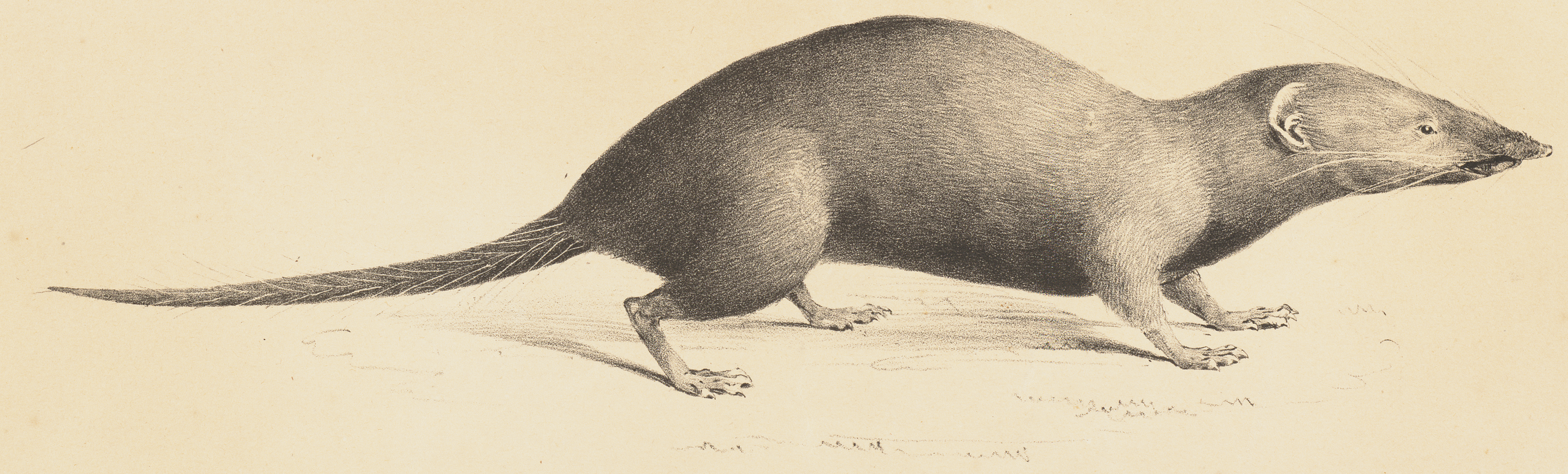
Illustration made between 1700 and 1880

== Distribution and habitat ==
This water shrew has been recorded in all prefectures of Honshu with the exception of Chiba Prefecture. On Kyushu they live in all prefectures, while no recent records exist from Shikoku. Fossils have been found on both Honshu and Shikoku ranging from the middle Pleistocene to the Holocene.

The Japanese water shrew inhabits mountain streams, small rivers and ponds. They have a preference for places with abundant shelters on riverbeds such as rocks or logs and water-eroded cavities on river banks. These water shrews occupy a home range that varies in length, with about 300 m (980 ft) for females and 600 m (2,000 ft) for males.

== Diet ==
The shrews prey on benthic organisms, such as aquatic insects, crabs, shrimp, and small fish. Specifically, they feed on insects of the orders Trichoptera (caddisflies), Ephemeroptera (mayflies), and Plecoptera (stoneflies), and the family Corydalidae (dobsonflies). They also consume frogs, salamanders, snails, crayfishes, earthworms, leeches, and spiders.

== Behaviour ==
Water shrews are capable at swimming and diving and go through several activity cycles in a day. They are known to sometimes "damage" fish in fish-farming ponds.

== Reproduction ==
No information is available on the mating system, gestation, and lactating period of the Japanese water shrew. There are two breeding seasons: February to June and October to December. The average number of embryos ranges from 1 to 6 (average is 4.2).

Mark and release surveys have led to an estimated maximum lifespan of more than 3 years.
