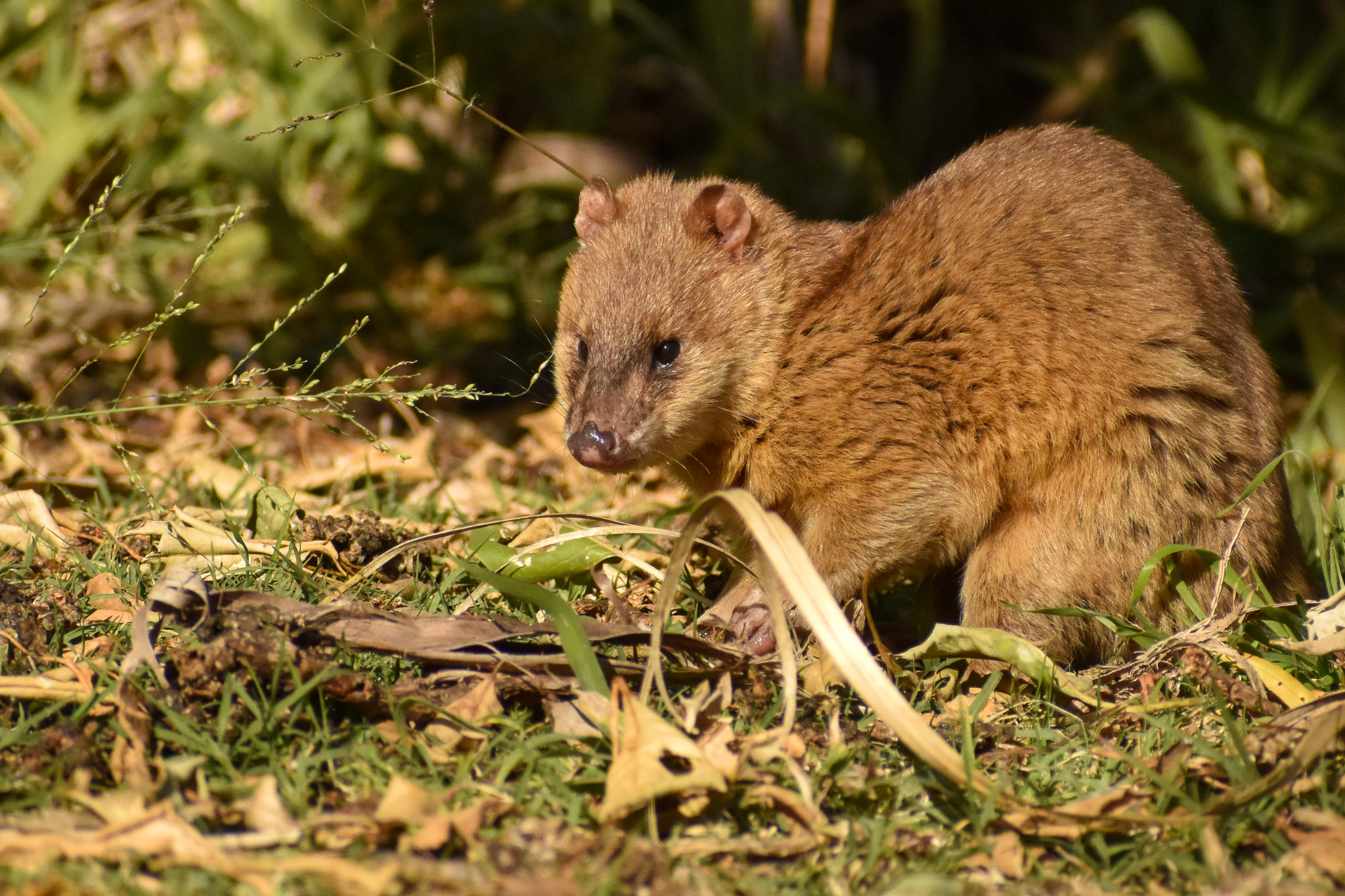

Conservation status
- Least Concern (IUCN 3.1)

Scientific classification
- Kingdom: Animalia
- Phylum: Chordata
- Class: Mammalia
- Infraclass: Marsupialia
- Order: Didelphimorphia
- Family: Didelphidae
- Tribe: Didelphini
- Genus: Lutreolina
- Species: L. crassicaudata

Binomial name
- Lutreolina crassicaudata Desmarest, 1804

Subspecies
- L. crassicaudata crassicaudata L. crassicaudata paranalis L. crassicaudata turneri
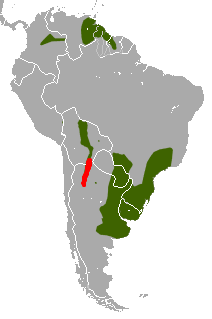
- Big lutrine opossum range (green)

= Big lutrine opossum =

Species of marsupial

The big lutrine opossum (Lutreolina crassicaudata), also called little water opossum, thick-tailed opossum and coligrueso, is a long-tailed, otter-like mammal native to grasslands of South America. It generally lives near water and is active at night, dawn or dusk. It eats mice, insects and crabs. Like all opossums, it is a marsupial and carries its young in a pouch.

== Description ==
The big lutrine opossum ("lutrine" means "otter-like" and "crass" meaning "thick, fat" and "cauda" meaning "tail") is a very peculiar opossum, having a long weasel-like body, short legs, small rounded ears, and dense reddish or yellowish fur. Nocturnal and crepuscular, they generally live in grasslands and savannas near water. They are terrestrial but are excellent swimmers and climbers.

== Distribution and habitat ==
The big lutrine opossum is distributed in Brazil, Argentina, Bolivia, Uruguay, Paraguay, Colombia and Guyana. Populations in the two last countries are isolated from the populations of all the other countries. It can be found in grasslands, savanna grassland, and gallery woodlands with permanent water bodies, in marshy or riparian habitats.

== Behavior and ecology ==
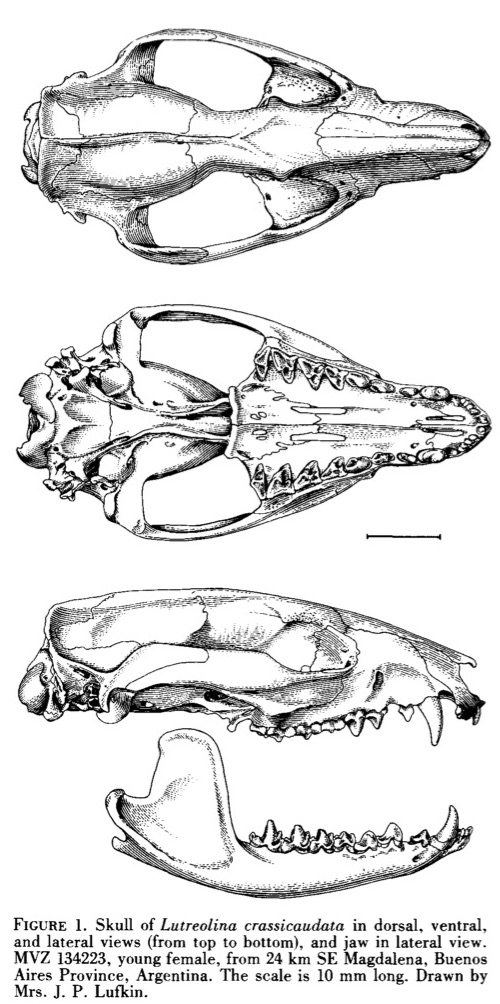
Lutreolina crassicaudata skull

The big lutrine opossum builds tight nests made of grass and reeds or utilize abandoned armadillo or viscacha burrows.

=== Diet ===
With a skull adapted for carnivory, the big lutrine opossum is carnivorous and insectivorous feeding on small rodents and lagomorphs, birds, insects, small crustaceans. It is considered to be the most carnivorous of all the members of the order Didelphimorphia. It preys on venomous snakes. Captive individuals have been observed eating butterfish mixed with meat, frogs, earthworms, shrimp and mice. Big lutrine opossums living close to urban areas scavenge through garbage, but this behavior is isolated and likely occurs due to necessity because there is less available prey in urban areas.

=== Reproduction ===
Breeding begins in September and carries on until April followed by approximately five months of anestrous, or time without estrus. Big lutrine opossums have two breeding periods per year resulting in litters of 7–11 offspring. Like most marsupials, litters are born into a pouch and are fed via lactation until the offspring is developed enough to leave the pouch. Gestation lasts approximately two weeks and young are weaned off mother's milk at around three months. The first litter is born in September and the second in December or January. The offspring from this breeding season reach sexual maturity at six months but do not begin reproducing until the following year. Males are heavier than females indicating sexual dimorphism likely caused by male-male competition for mates.

=== Locomotion ===
The big lutrine opossum is quadrupedal and extremely agile. It is primarily terrestrial but also an adept climber and swimmer. Its long body, proportionally short limbs, and no undulation of the vertebral column disqualifies it from being categorized as a specialized semi-aquatic mammal. Although it cannot be classified as a truly specialized mammal, it is a strong swimmer drawing power from the hind limbs as the forelimbs paddle. By employing a variety of gaits its locomotion abilities allows it to run, walk, climb, swim through all the different kinds of obstacles found in the grassy-woodland and marshy areas in which it lives. It can dive and swim with ease, expanding its prey base to aquatic invertebrates.

== Taxonomy ==
- Lutreolina crassicaudata crassicaudata, Brasil, Paraguay
- Lutreolina crassicaudata paranalis Argentina, Uruguay.
- Lutreolina crassicaudata turneri, Guiana, Venezuela and Colombia.

== Evolution ==
Fossils found in Minas Gerais, Brazil indicate that the big lutrine opossum emerged in the late Pleistocene epoch. Lutreolina fossils found in Tarija, Bolivia as well as samples uncovered across Argentina also indicate appearance of lutrine opossum ancestors during the late Pleistocene. For a short time in Argentina, the opossums were hunted for their pelts for fur trade and to line garments, but this market quickly declined because the color of the opossum pelts would fade over time.

Genetic and morphological studies indicate that the population in the Yungas, which was formerly considered a population of L. crassicaudata (with both species being grouped under the common name "lutrine opossum"), is in fact a distinct species, Massoia's lutrine opossum (Lutreolina massoia). As its name suggests, the big lutrine opossum is larger than Massoia's lutrine opossum.
