= Massoia's lutrine opossum =

Conservation status
- Least Concern (IUCN 3.1)

Scientific classification
- Kingdom: Animalia
- Phylum: Chordata
- Class: Mammalia
- Infraclass: Marsupialia
- Order: Didelphimorphia
- Family: Didelphidae
- Genus: Lutreolina
- Species: L. massoia

Binomial name
- Lutreolina massoia Martínez-Lanfranco, Flores, Jayat, & D'Elía, 2014
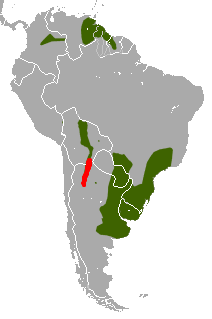
- Massoia's lutrine opossum range (red)

Species of opossum

Massoia's lutrine opossum (Lutreolina massoia) is a species of opossum native to South America.

== Taxonomy ==
It was formerly considered a disjunct population of the big lutrine opossum (L. crassicaudata), but a 2014 study determined it to be a distinct species and described it as such. It is possible that climatic changes in the past led to an expansion of vegetation in the Dry Chaco, allowing the ancestral Lutreolina to cross it, with the later aridification of the Chaco isolating both species and leading to their divergence.

This species was named after Argentine zoologist Elio Massoia, who made significant contributions to the knowledge of South American mammal diversity, and was among the first researchers to notice the distinctiveness of the Lutreolina populations of the Yungas.

== Distribution ==
It ranges from south-central Bolivia south to northern Argentina, where it is restricted to the Yungas region just east of the Andes. It has a different habitat from L. crassicaudata, being found primarily in lowland savanna grasslands. It seems to primarily use areas with dense ground cover and aquatic environments.

== Description ==
L. massoia is smaller in size than L. crassicaudata, and differs in the size and shape of the skull, as well as in the dentition.
