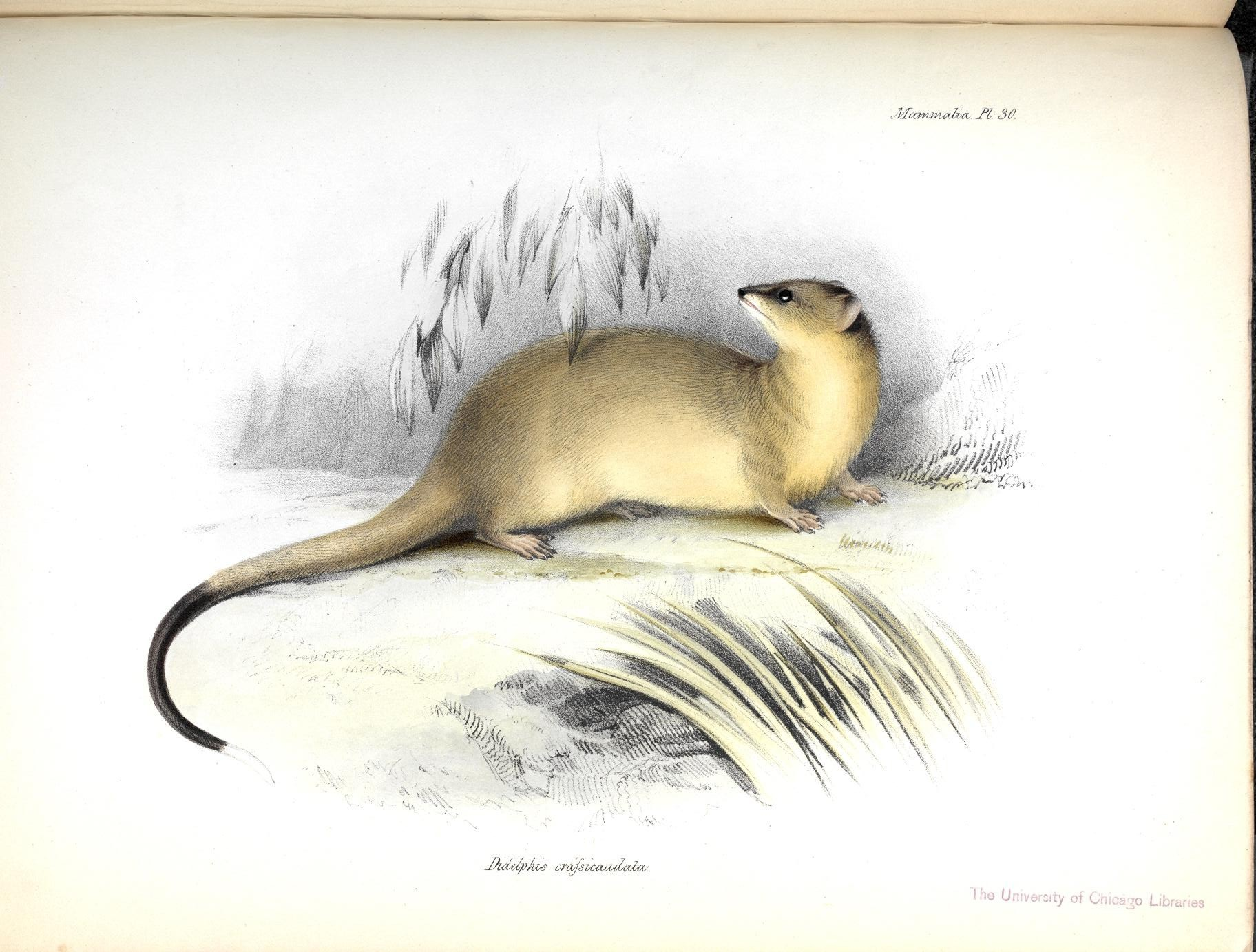
- Big lutrine opossum (L. crassicaudata)

Scientific classification
- Kingdom: Animalia
- Phylum: Chordata
- Class: Mammalia
- Infraclass: Marsupialia
- Order: Didelphimorphia
- Family: Didelphidae
- Tribe: Didelphini
- Genus: Lutreolina; Thomas, 1910

Type species
- Didelphis crassicaudata Desmarest, 1804

Species
- Lutreolina crassicaudata; Lutreolina massoia; †Lutreolina biforata; †Lutreolina materdei

= Lutreolina =

Lutreolina Temporal range: Miocene - Recent

Genus of marsupial

Lutreolina is a genus of opossum found in South America. Both extant species in this genus are known as lutrine opossums. They have an otter-like body plan and occasionally semiaquatic tendencies, hence the genus name Lutreolina, which is Latin for "otter-like".

Formerly, only one species, the big lutrine opossum (previously known as just the lutrine opossum) was recognized, but a 2014 study described a second species, Lutreolina massoia, on genetic and morphological grounds.

There are also two fossil species recognized, Lutreolina biforata (formerly placed in Hyperdidelphys) and Lutreolina materdei.
