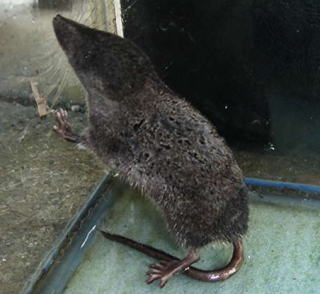
- Japanese water shrew (Chimarrogale platycephalus)

Scientific classification
- Domain: Eukaryota
- Kingdom: Animalia
- Phylum: Chordata
- Class: Mammalia
- Order: Eulipotyphla
- Family: Soricidae
- Tribe: Nectogalini
- Genus: Chimarrogale; Anderson, 1877

Type species
- Crossopus himalayicus

= Asiatic water shrew =

Asiatic water shrews

Genus of mammals

The Asiatic water shrews are the members of the genus Chimarrogale. They are mammals in the subfamily Soricinae of the family Soricidae. They are aquatic, with some species inhabiting streams. The genus contains the following species:

- Malayan water shrew (Chimarrogale hantu)
- Himalayan water shrew (Chimarrogale himalayica)
- Bornean water shrew (Chimarrogale phaeura)
- Japanese water shrew (Chimarrogale platycephalus)
- Chinese water shrew (Chimarrogale styani)
- Sumatran water shrew (Chimarrogale sumatrana)
