= Rheomys =

Scientific classification
- Domain: Eukaryota
- Kingdom: Animalia
- Phylum: Chordata
- Class: Mammalia
- Order: Rodentia
- Family: Cricetidae
- Subfamily: Sigmodontinae
- Subtribe: Ichthyomyina
- Genus: Rheomys; Thomas, 1906

Type species
- Rheomys underwoodi

Species
- Rheomys mexicanus Rheomys raptor Rheomys thomasi Rheomys underwoodi

Genus of rodents

Rheomys is a genus of Mexican and Central American semiaquatic rodents in the family Cricetidae.

It contains the following species:

- Mexican water mouse, Rheomys mexicanus
- Goldman's water mouse, Rheomys raptor
- Thomas's water mouse, Rheomys thomasi
- Underwood's water mouse, Rheomys underwoodi
