= Mexican water mouse =

Conservation status
- Endangered (IUCN 3.1)

Scientific classification
- Kingdom: Animalia
- Phylum: Chordata
- Class: Mammalia
- Order: Rodentia
- Family: Cricetidae
- Subfamily: Sigmodontinae
- Genus: Rheomys
- Species: R. mexicanus

Binomial name
- Rheomys mexicanus Goodwin, 1959

Species of rodent

The Mexican water mouse, Mexican fishing mouse or Goodwin's water mouse (Rheomys mexicanus), is a species of semiaquatic rodent in the family Cricetidae. It has a restricted range in the state of Oaxaca in southern Mexico, Threatened by deforestation and water pollution, it is listed as Endangered by the International Union for Conservation of Nature (IUCN).

== Taxonomy ==
The Mexican water mouse was first described as Rheomys mexicanus in 1959 by the American zoologist George Gilbert Goodwin. He was the assistant curator of mammals at the American Museum of Natural History in New York City, and went on a number of collecting expeditions, including one to Iran in 1938.

== Distribution ==
The species is endemic to Mexico and has a very restricted range in the state of Oaxaca on the Pacific slope of the mountains, being known from sites in the vicinity of San Pablo Guelatao, San José Lachiguirí, Unión Hidalgo and Tehuantepec.

== Ecology ==
This rodent is found in and near the headwater streams of rivers in tropical forested areas. Its natural history is poorly known, but it seems to rely on finding its food in the small streams among closed canopy forests in which it lives. Other members of Rheomys are also semiaquatic, with carnivorous diets and similar riparian habitats.

== Status ==
Rheomys mexicanus has a total area of occupancy of less than 5,000 km^{2} (2,000 mi^{2}), and within this distribution, it seems to have a fragmented range, being known from only four locations. It has a habitat requirement for pure, unpolluted water, and the quality and quantity of suitable habitat is declining. This habitat is under threat from deforestation and from water pollution, including from such human activities as household clothes-washing. As a result of these threats, the International Union for Conservation of Nature has listed the conservation status of this mouse as "endangered".
