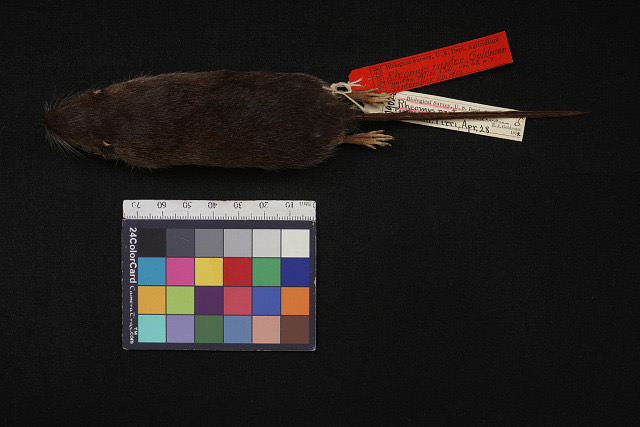

Conservation status
- Least Concern (IUCN 3.1)

Scientific classification
- Kingdom: Animalia
- Phylum: Chordata
- Class: Mammalia
- Infraclass: Placentalia
- Order: Rodentia
- Family: Cricetidae
- Subfamily: Sigmodontinae
- Genus: Rheomys
- Species: R. raptor

Binomial name
- Rheomys raptor Goldman, 1912

= Goldman's water mouse =

Species of rodent

Rheomys raptor, also known as the Goldman's water mouse or Goldman's Ichthyomyine, is a species of rodent in the family Cricetidae. This mouse is semiaquatic and its carnivorous diet includes invertebrates. The conservation status of the species is rated as "least concern" because of its sizable population and the presence of several protected areas within its range. However, deforestation and water pollution represent potential threats.

== Distribution and habitat ==
Rheomys raptor is found in Central America with sightings mainly in Costa Rica but has also been seen in eastern Panama. R. raptor lives in forests with a water source nearby, such as a fast-flowing stream, and inland wetlands. R. raptor has been identified in Costa Rican and Panamanian cloud forests at altitudes ranging from 1300 to 1600 meters.

== Parasites ==
Rheomys raptor is the first known species of its genus to harbor an ectoparasite, Hoplopleura janzeni. H. janzeni is a newly identified species of Hoplopleura, sucking lice, that was solely discovered on a female R. raptor located at the Monteverde Cloud Forest Reserve in Costa Rica.
