= Chinese water shrew =

Conservation status
- Least Concern (IUCN 3.1)

Scientific classification
- Kingdom: Animalia
- Phylum: Chordata
- Class: Mammalia
- Order: Eulipotyphla
- Family: Soricidae
- Genus: Chimarrogale
- Species: C. styani

Binomial name
- Chimarrogale styani de Winton, 1899
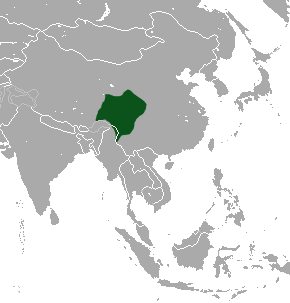
- Chinese water shrew range

Species of mammal

The Chinese water shrew (Chimarrogale styani) is a species of mammal in the family Soricidae. It is found in China, Myanmar, and possibly India.
