= Sumatran water shrew =

Conservation status
- Data Deficient (IUCN 3.1)

Scientific classification
- Kingdom: Animalia
- Phylum: Chordata
- Class: Mammalia
- Order: Eulipotyphla
- Family: Soricidae
- Genus: Chimarrogale
- Species: C. sumatrana

Binomial name
- Chimarrogale sumatrana (Thomas, 1921)
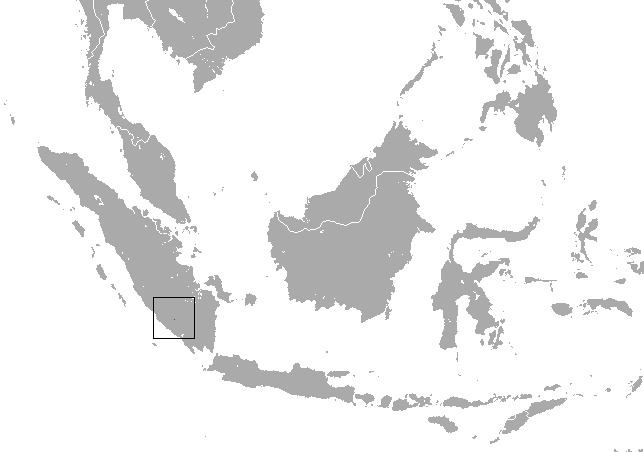
- Sumatran water shrew range

Species of mammal

The Sumatran water shrew (Chimarrogale sumatrana) is a red-toothed shrew found only in the Padang highlands of western Sumatra, Indonesia. Its natural habitats are streams in montane forests. The species is only known from a holotype, which is damaged, and was previously listed as critically endangered by IUCN. It is believed to be severely threatened by habitat loss.
