= Malayan water shrew =

Conservation status
- Near Threatened (IUCN 3.1)

Scientific classification
- Kingdom: Animalia
- Phylum: Chordata
- Class: Mammalia
- Order: Eulipotyphla
- Family: Soricidae
- Genus: Chimarrogale
- Species: C. hantu

Binomial name
- Chimarrogale hantu Harrison, 1958
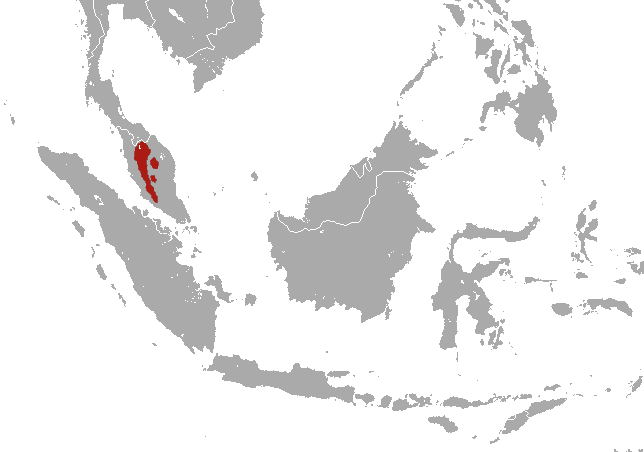
- Malayan water shrew range

Species of mammal

The Malayan water shrew (Chimarrogale hantu), also known as the hantu water shrew, is a red-toothed shrew recorded only from the Malaysian state of Selangor. It was listed as a critically endangered, but is now considered near threatened.

It gets its scientific name hantu from the Malay word for ghost.

== Anatomy ==
The Malayan water shrew has a white underside, a black coat along its top and sides and a fringe of bristles running along the surface of the tail and on the paws which act as swimming aids. The teeth have red tips. The Malayan water shrew can grow up to about 10 cm (3.9 in) in height and 20 cm (7.9 in) in length.

== Habitat ==
The Malayan water shrew lives in the Tropical Rainforests of Peninsula Malaysia. It lives mainly by fresh water lakes and rivers surrounded by vegetation and spends much of its time underwater. Underwater this shrew likes to stay in leafy areas to avoid predators and surprise its prey, which include fish, frogs and plants.
