= Bornean water shrew =

Conservation status
- Endangered (IUCN 3.1)

Scientific classification
- Kingdom: Animalia
- Phylum: Chordata
- Class: Mammalia
- Order: Eulipotyphla
- Family: Soricidae
- Genus: Chimarrogale
- Species: C. phaeura

Binomial name
- Chimarrogale phaeura Thomas, 1898
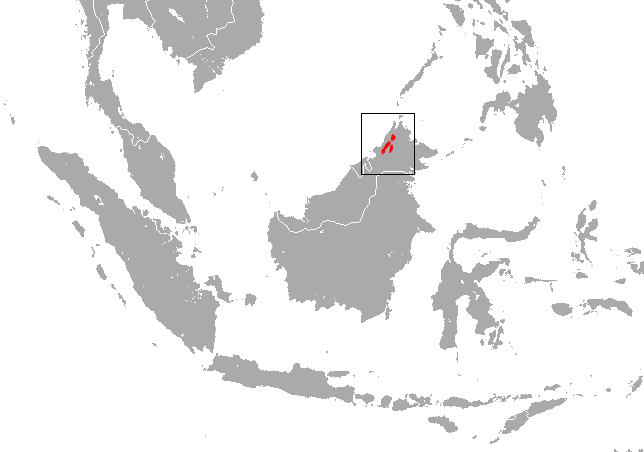
- Bornean water shrew range

Species of mammal

The Bornean water shrew (Chimarrogale phaeura) is a species of mammal in the family Soricidae. It is endemic to Malaysia. Its natural habitat is rivers.
