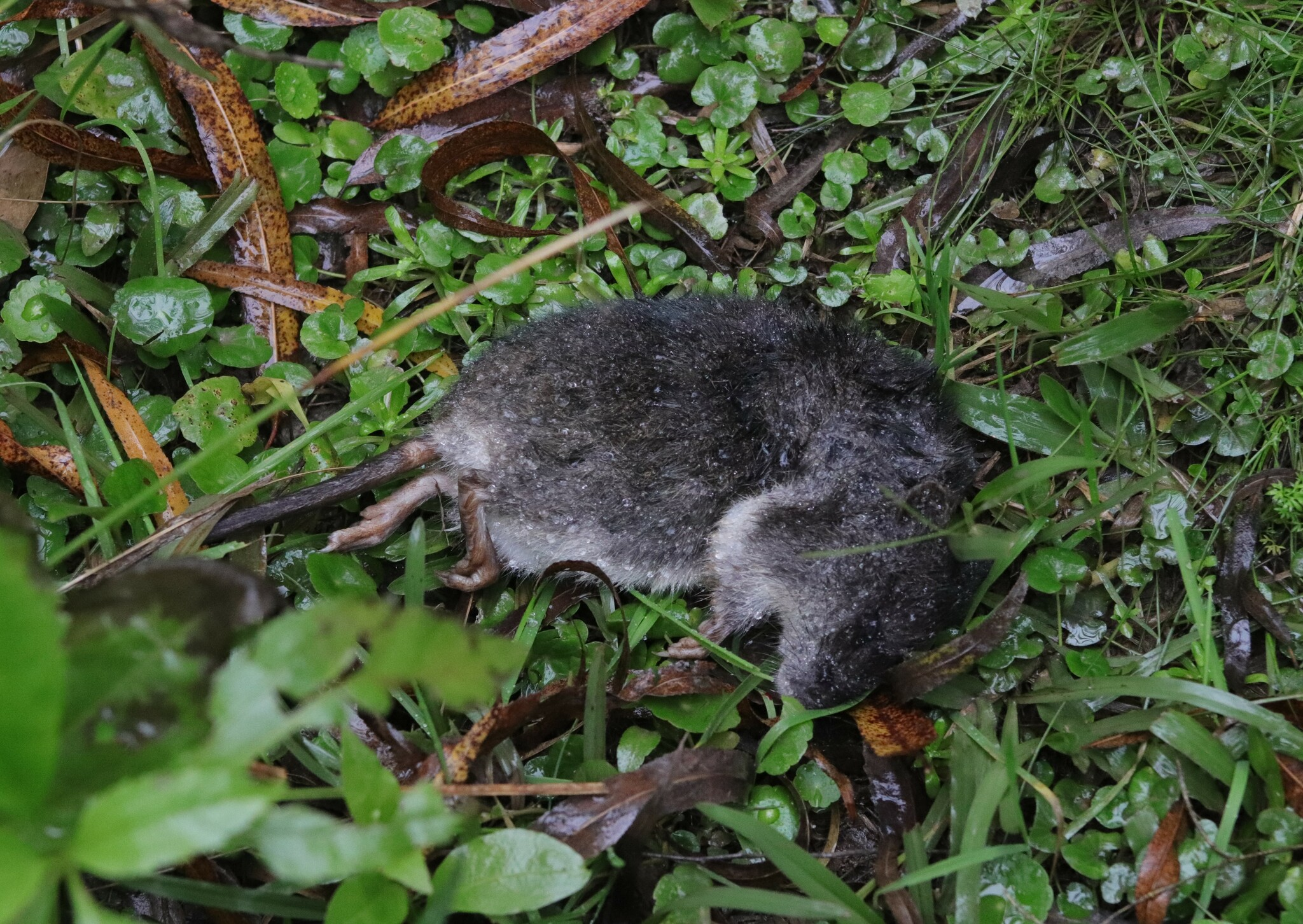

Conservation status
- Least Concern (IUCN 3.1)

Scientific classification
- Kingdom: Animalia
- Phylum: Chordata
- Class: Mammalia
- Order: Rodentia
- Family: Cricetidae
- Subfamily: Sigmodontinae
- Genus: Scapteromys
- Species: S. aquaticus

Binomial name
- Scapteromys aquaticus Thomas, 1920

= Argentine swamp rat =

Species of rodent

The Argentine swamp rat (Scapteromys aquaticus) is a semiaquatic rodent species from South America. It is found in northeastern Argentina and Paraguay, where it lives in freshwater marshes and along the southern coast of the Río de la Plata estuary, as well as in woodland. It is characterized by having stiff hairs on its otherwise naked tail, which are believed to help the animal swim. S. aquaticus is similar in build to members of the genus Rattus. "[It] has a relatively larger head, a stouter body, larger feet, and a relatively longer tail." The pelage along its back is "long and glossy" varying from brown to dark brown. It can have a grayish wash in some individuals. "The sides have a yellowish cast." The pelage in the abdominal region is typically an off white color. The forefeet are large for use in swimming and digging. All digits, including the pollex are equipped with a claw. Its karyotype has 2n = 32.

== Conservation ==
According to the IUCN Red List of Threatened Species in 2008 the Argentine swamp rat was classified as least concern because of "its wide distribution, presumed large population, and because it is unlikely to be declining at nearly the rate required to qualify for listing in a threatened category."

== Habitat ==
These rodents are found in low, flooded grasslands, salt marshes and any area with standing water. They are good swimmers and employ the aid of their "swimming fringe" and have also been observed diving.

== Distribution ==
Argentine swamp rats are found scattered through the Rio de la Plata basin and other areas in east-central Argentina, south coastal Brazil, southern Paraguay, and Uruguay.

== Biology and behavior ==
Argentine swamp rats eat mostly beetles and earthworms. They are active during both day and night. Females were found, on average, with between three and five young and breeding males were found year-round. There is no evidence that they dig burrows. Researchers have discovered young in shallow depressions in the ground covered by matted grass.
