= Glacier Bay water shrew =

Conservation status
- Data Deficient (IUCN 3.1)

Scientific classification
- Kingdom: Animalia
- Phylum: Chordata
- Class: Mammalia
- Order: Eulipotyphla
- Family: Soricidae
- Genus: Sorex
- Species: S. alaskanus

Binomial name
- Sorex alaskanus Merriam, 1900
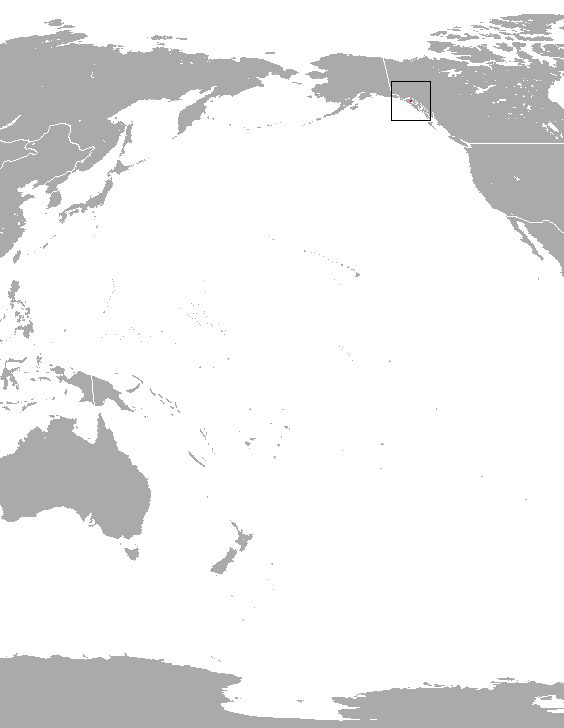
- Glacier Bay water shrew range

Species of mammal

The Glacier Bay water shrew (Sorex alaskanus) is a species of mammal in the family Soricidae. It is endemic to Alaska in the United States. It can swim underwater, and when it stops swimming, air trapped in its fur lets it float back up to the surface. Owing to small hairs on its feet, the water shrew can run across the water. Its fur is water resistant, although if it does get wet it returns to shore to dry itself with its hind feet. It eats aquatic fly nymphs and terrestrial invertebrates.
