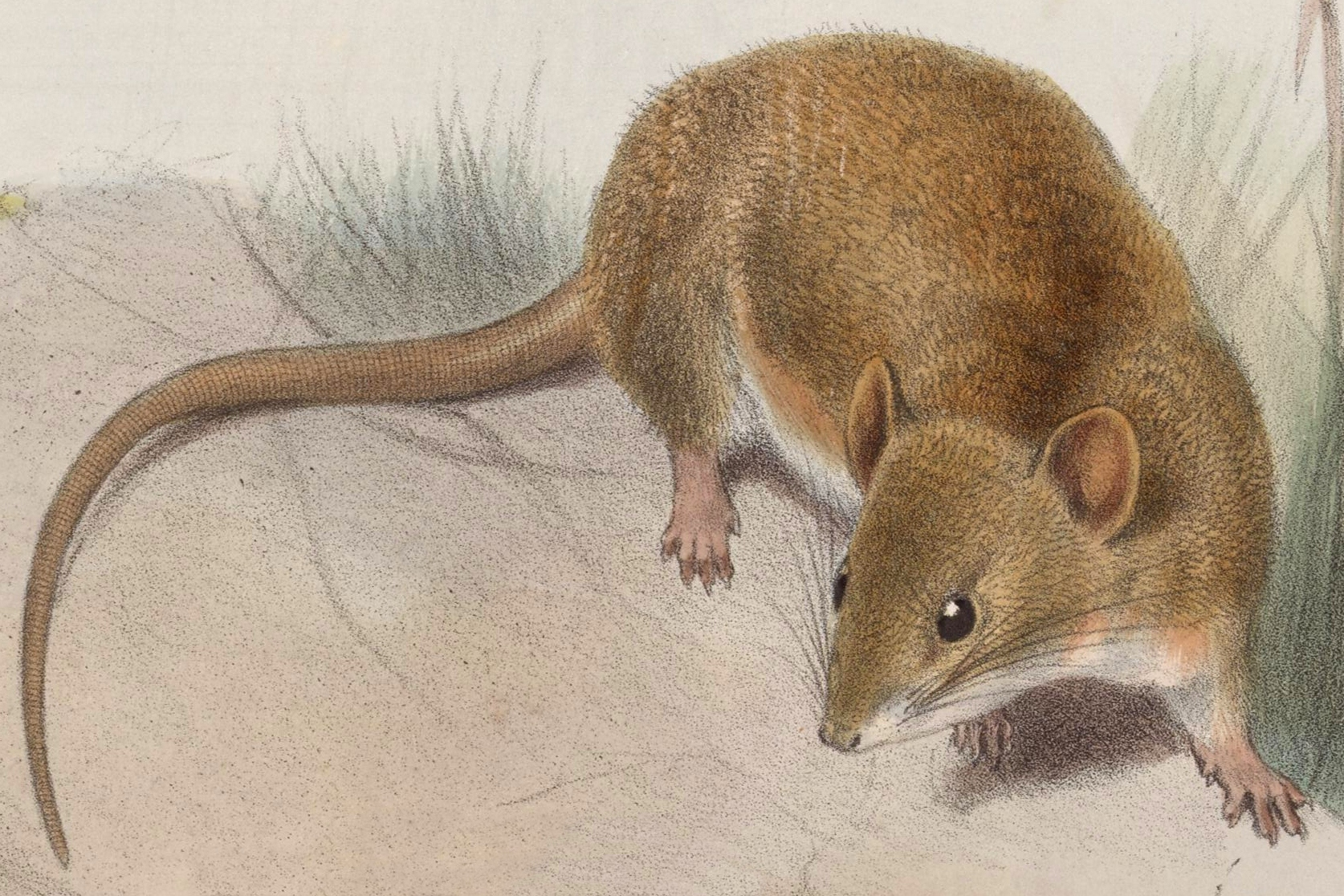

Conservation status
- Least Concern (IUCN 3.1)

Scientific classification
- Kingdom: Animalia
- Phylum: Chordata
- Class: Mammalia
- Infraclass: Placentalia
- Order: Rodentia
- Family: Cricetidae
- Subfamily: Sigmodontinae
- Genus: Oryzomys
- Species: O. couesi

Binomial name
- Oryzomys couesi (Alston, 1877) (Note: The date of publication of Alston's name is listed alternatively in the literature as 1876 or 1877. The name was proposed on p. 756 of the 1876 issue of the Proceedings of the Zoological Society of London, but the parts of this journal were not always published in the volume year. A 2005 review confirms that p. 756 of the 1876 volume was published in 1877.)
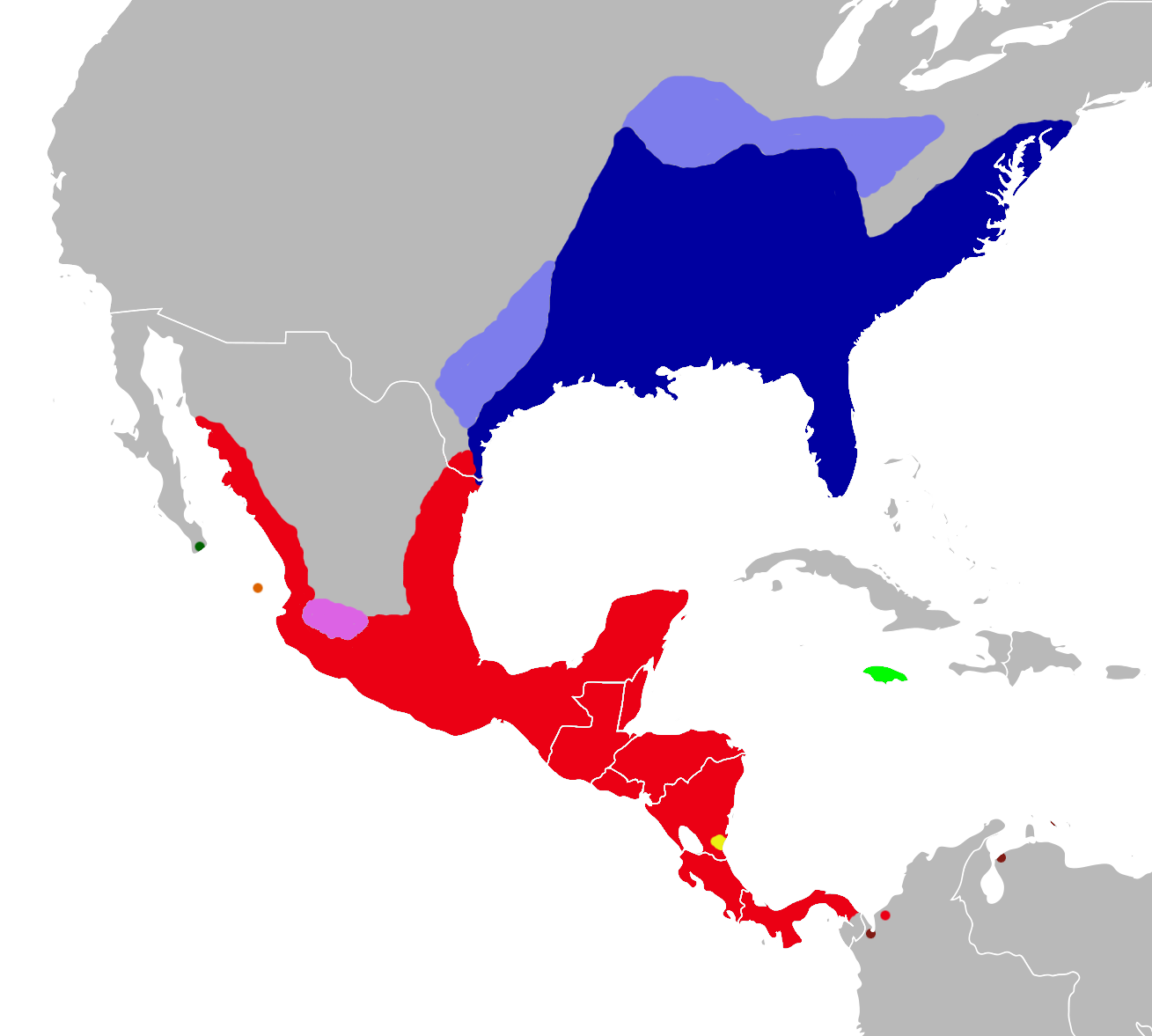
- Distribution of Oryzomys couesi (in red) and other species of Oryzomys.

Synonyms
- Hesperomys couesi Alston, 1877; Oryzomys couesi: Thomas, 1893; Oryzomys palustris couesi: Hall, 1960; and see below.

= Oryzomys couesi =

Oryzomys couesi Temporal range: Late Pleistocene to Recent

Semiaquatic rodent in the family Cricetidae

Oryzomys couesi, also known as Coues's rice rat, is a semiaquatic rodent in the family Cricetidae occurring from southernmost Texas through Mexico and Central America into northwestern Colombia. It is usually found in wet habitats, such as marshes, but also lives in drier forests and shrublands. Weighing about 43 to 82 g (1.5 to 2.9 oz), O. couesi is a medium-sized to large rat. The coarse fur is buff to reddish above and white to buff below. The hindfeet show some specializations for life in the water, such as reduced ungual tufts of hair around the digits. It has 56 chromosomes. There is much geographic variation in size, proportions, color, and skull features. Oryzomys couesi is active during the night and builds nests of vegetation that are suspended among reeds about 1 m (3.3 ft) above the ground. It is an excellent swimmer and dives well, but can also climb in vegetation. An omnivore, it eats both plant and animal food, including seeds and insects. It breeds throughout the year; females give birth to about four young after a pregnancy of 21 to 28 days. The species may be infected by several different parasites and by two hantaviruses.

The species was first described in 1877, the first of many related species from the region described until the 1910s. In 1918, Edward Alphonso Goldman consolidated most into the single species O. couesi and in 1960 Raymond Hall united this taxon with its United States relative, the marsh rice rat (O. palustris), into a single widespread species; subsequently, many related, localized species retained by Goldman were also included in this taxon. After studies of the contact zone in Texas, where O. couesi and the marsh rice rat meet, were published in 1979 and underscored the distinctness of the two, they were again regarded as separate. Since then, some of the peripheral forms of the group, such as O. antillarum from Jamaica and O. peninsulae from the Baja California Peninsula, have been reinstated as species. Nevertheless, O. couesi as currently constituted is likely a composite of several species; a 2010 study, using DNA sequence data, found evidence to recognize separate species from the Pacific and eastern sides of the distribution of O. couesi and two additional species from Panama and Costa Rica. Generally, O. couesi is common and of no conservation concern, and it is even considered a plague species in places, but some populations are threatened.

== Taxonomy ==
Oryzomys couesi and at least six more narrowly distributed species with peripheral distributions together form the O. couesi group within the genus Oryzomys. The eighth species of the genus, the marsh rice rat (O. palustris) is the only member of its own group (unless western populations are classified as a separate species, O. texensis). Oryzomys previously included many other species, which were reclassified in various studies culminating in contributions by Marcelo Weksler and coworkers in 2006 that removed more than forty species from the genus. All are placed in the tribe Oryzomyini ("rice rats"), a diverse assemblage of over a hundred species, and on higher taxonomic levels in the subfamily Sigmodontinae of the family Cricetidae, along with hundreds of other species of mainly small rodents.

=== History ===
Edward Alston first described Oryzomys couesi in 1877, using three specimens from Mexico and Guatemala. He named the animal Hesperomys couesi, placing it in the now-defunct genus Hesperomys, and noted similarities to the marsh rice rat (then called Hesperomys palustris) and two species now placed in Tylomys. The specific name, couesi, honors American naturalist Elliott Coues, who had done much work on North American rodents. In 1893, Oldfield Thomas wrote that the species, by then placed in the genus Oryzomys as Oryzomys couesi, had caused much confusion about its identity, because the three specimens (one from Cobán, Guatemala, and two from Mexico) used by Alston in fact belonged to two or three different species. He restricted the name couesi to the animal from Guatemala, and introduced the new name Oryzomys fulgens for one of the Mexican animals. Several other related species were described from the early 1890s onwards and in 1901 Clinton Hart Merriam united many of those into a palustris-mexicanus group of species, which also included the marsh rice rat.

Edward Alphonso Goldman revised North American Oryzomys in 1918 and consolidated many forms into a single species Oryzomys couesi, with ten subspecies distributed from southern Texas and western Mexico south to Costa Rica. He placed it in an Oryzomys palustris group with the marsh rice rat and several species with more limited distributions, which he regarded as related to O. couesi but distinctive enough to be classified as separate species. In the 1930s, a few more forms related to O. couesi were described. As then recognized, the ranges of the marsh rice rat, a United States species, and Oryzomys couesi meet in southern Texas. In 1960, Raymond Hall reviewed specimens from this contact zone and found no grounds on which to separate the two species; thus, he reduced O. couesi to a subspecies of the marsh rice rat. Other workers continued this lumping and by 1971 all other species Goldman had placed in the O. palustris group were classified under the marsh rice rat, together with Oryzomys azuerensis from Panama, described as a species in 1937.

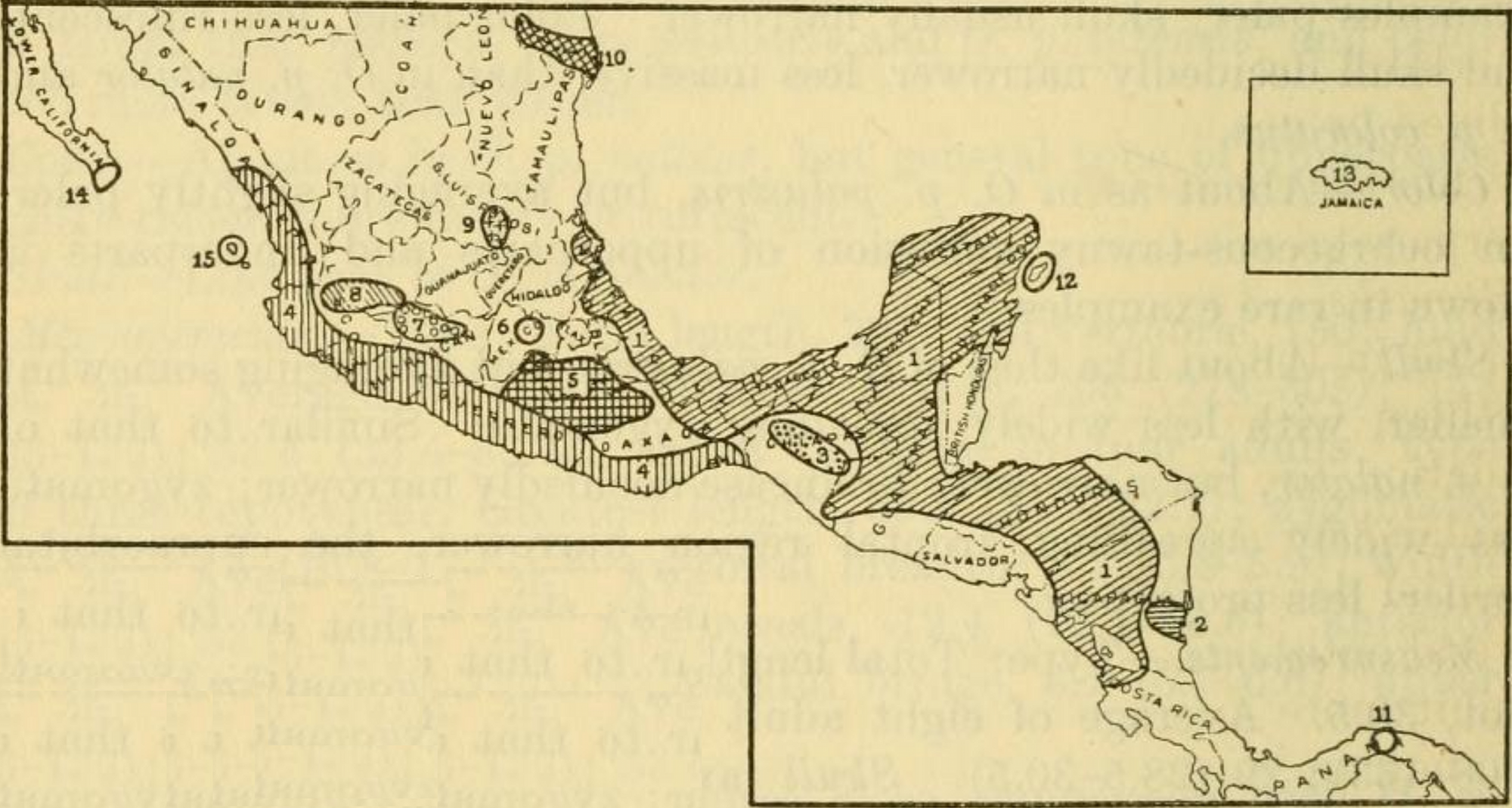
Distribution of Oryzomys couesi and related species according to Goldman (1918): 1, Oryzomys couesi couesi; 2, O. c. richmondi; 3, O. c. zygomaticus; 4, O. c. mexicanus; 5, O. c. aztecus; 6, O. c. crinitus; 7, O. c. regillus; 8, O. c. albiventer; 9, O. c. peragrus; 10, O. c. aquaticus; 11, O. gatunensis; 12, O. cozumelae; 13, O. antillarum; 14, O. peninsulae; 15, O. nelsoni.

Additional studies of the palustris–couesi contact zone in Texas published in 1979, using more specimens and characters, indicated that the two species are in fact easily distinguishable there; therefore, O. couesi has since been regarded as a species distinct from the marsh rice rat. Afterward, some of the other forms synonymized under O. couesi or O. palustris were resurrected as separate species—Oryzomys nelsoni from the Marías Islands, western Mexico, and Oryzomys antillarum from Jamaica. In 2009, Michael Carleton and Joaquin Arroyo-Cabrales reviewed western Mexican Oryzomys, reaffirmed the distinctness of O. nelsoni, and reinstated O. peninsulae from the tip of the Baja California Peninsula and O. albiventer from interior Mexico as species. Still, O. couesi included 22 synonyms, and Carleton and Arroyo-Cabrales wrote that further research on O. couesi and related species would certainly result in the recognition of additional species.

A 2010 study by Delton Hanson and colleagues used DNA sequence data from the mitochondrial gene cytochrome b (Cytb) and two nuclear markers, exon 1 of the interphotoreceptor retinoid-binding protein gene (Rbp3) and intron 2 of alcohol dehydrogenase gene 1 (Adh1-I2) to study relationships among populations of the marsh rice rat and O. couesi. The Cytb data placed all studied specimens of O. couesi in a clade sister to the marsh rice rat; the mean genetic distance between the two groups was 11.30%, much larger than the distance between sister species in the related genera Melanomys and Nectomys (7.48% and 7.52%, respectively). Within the O. couesi clade, two populations from Panama and Costa Rica were successively basal to the other specimens, which fell into two large subclades—one containing animals from the Pacific seaboard from western Mexico to El Salvador and the other containing rats from the eastern seaboard from Texas to Nicaragua. The Panamanian and Costa Rican populations differed by 6.53% to 11.93% from the others and the western and eastern subclades differed by 4.41% on average. Data from both of the slower-evolving nuclear markers Rbp3 and Adh1-I2 also placed examples of Oryzomys in two main clades, but did not recover the western and eastern groups of O. couesi as separate clades. In addition, Adh1-I2 placed the Costa Rican population within the marsh rice rat clade and placed some western O. couesi specimens closer to the marsh rice rat than to the O. couesi group. The combined dataset supported the western and eastern clades within O. couesi and placed the Costa Rican population marginally closer to the marsh rice rat than to O. couesi. Using the genetic species concept, the authors suggested that the four groups they found within O. couesi should be recognized as distinct species. If this suggestion is followed, the eastern subclade would retain the name Oryzomys couesi, the western group would be named Oryzomys mexicanus, and the appropriate names for the Panamanian and Costa Rican species remain unclear.

=== Western Mexico to El Salvador ===
Taxonomic synonyms
- Oryzomys bulleri J.A. Allen, 1897
- Oryzomys couesi lambi Burt, 1934
- Oryzomys mexicanus J.A. Allen, 1897
- Oryzomys rufus Merriam, 1901
- Oryzomys zygomaticus Merriam, 1901

Populations of Oryzomys couesi from Jalisco, western Mexico, east to El Salvador form a single Cytb clade, which Hanson and colleagues proposed to recognize as the species Oryzomys mexicanus. These animals differ by 4.4% from Oryzomys couesi in the strict sense, which occurs to the north and east, are separated by mountain ranges from the latter, harbor different species of hantavirus, and according to Merriam (1901) have more robust skulls, with larger molars, stronger zygomatic arches (cheekbones), and better developed ridges along the margins of the interorbital region of the skull (between the eyes). Within the "Oryzomys mexicanus" clade, Cytb sequence differences average 2.06% and western (Jalisco to Oaxaca) and eastern (Chiapas and El Salvador) groups form distinct subclades; Hanson and colleagues recognized these as different subspecies, mexicanus in the west and zygomaticus in the east.

As defined by Carleton and Arroyo-Cabrales in 2009, the subspecies Oryzomys couesi mexicanus occurs along the Pacific coast from central Sonora to southeastern Oaxaca and inland along rivers into central Michoacán, southern Morelos, southern Puebla, and northwestern Oaxaca. It usually lives below 1,000 m (3,300 ft) altitude, but has been found at 1,525 m (5,003 ft) in Jalisco. This distributional pattern is similar to that of other western Mexican rodents such as Sigmodon mascotensis, Hodomys alleni, Peromyscus perfulvus, and Osgoodomys banderanus and has been recognized as a distinct biogeographic zone in some reviews. O. c. mexicanus occurs close to three other Oryzomys species—O. albiventer, O. peninsulae, and O. nelsoni—which are larger and different in some proportions and details of coloration.

Joel Asaph Allen first described Oryzomys mexicanus as a full species in 1897 from specimens from Jalisco. In the same publication, he also described Oryzomys bulleri from nearby Nayarit, but he did not compare the two with each other. Merriam added a second species from Nayarit, Oryzomys rufus, in 1901, noting that it was smaller and more reddish than mexicanus. Goldman synonymized the three as O. couesi mexicanus in 1918 and in 2009 Carleton and Arroyo-Cabrales concurred, arguing that the differences between rufus and mexicanus were age-related and within the normal range of variation of the animal. Another subspecies, Oryzomys couesi lambi, was described by Burt in 1934 from central coastal Sonora, which extended the range of the species by 400 mi (640 km) at the time. This form is dark gray-brown, much darker than mexicanus, and has a shorter tail and weaker jugals. Carleton and Arroyo-Cabrales wrote that it is similar to mexicanus, but that further research is needed to determine whether it should be recognized as a subspecies. Large O. couesi from northern Sinaloa may also belong to this form. Goldman wrote that mexicanus was very similar to nominate couesi, but usually with paler fur; the upperparts are more buffy than in couesi and the underparts are usually white, but may be buffy, the normal color in couesi.

Oryzomys zygomaticus was first described by Merriam in 1901 as a separate species similar to mexicanus, but with the zygomatic arches broadly spreading and curved downward. Goldman, who reduced it to a subspecies of couesi, recorded it from southwestern Guatemala and nearby Chiapas and described it as slightly paler than O. c. couesi but darker than O. c. mexicanus. Three specimens from central El Salvador have Cytb sequences similar to those of zygomaticus, but in The Mammals of El Salvador (1961), Burt and Stirton recorded only the subspecies couesi from the country, while noting that specimens from some localities were slightly paler than others.

=== Interior Mexico ===
Taxonomic synonyms
- Oryzomys crinitus aztecus Merriam, 1901
- Oryzomys crinitus Merriam, 1901
- Oryzomys fulgens Thomas, 1893
- Oryzomys couesi regillus Goldman, 1915

Goldman grouped four subspecies of couesi from the interior plateaus of central Mexico together—albiventer, crinitus, aztecus, and regillus. Three of those (albiventer from Jalisco, crinitus from the Distrito Federal, and aztecus from Morelos) were described by Merriam in 1901, and Goldman had himself described regillus from Michoacán in 1915. According to Goldman, aztecus is pale and large-toothed, crinitus is large, dark and large-toothed, regillus is large and dark, and albiventer is large and relatively pale.

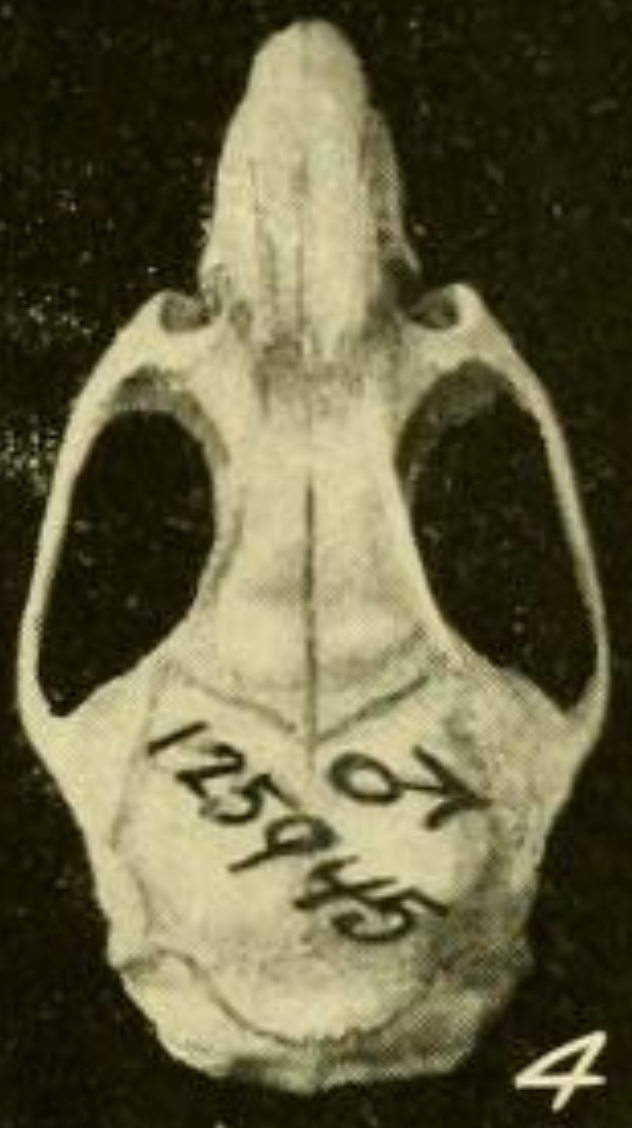
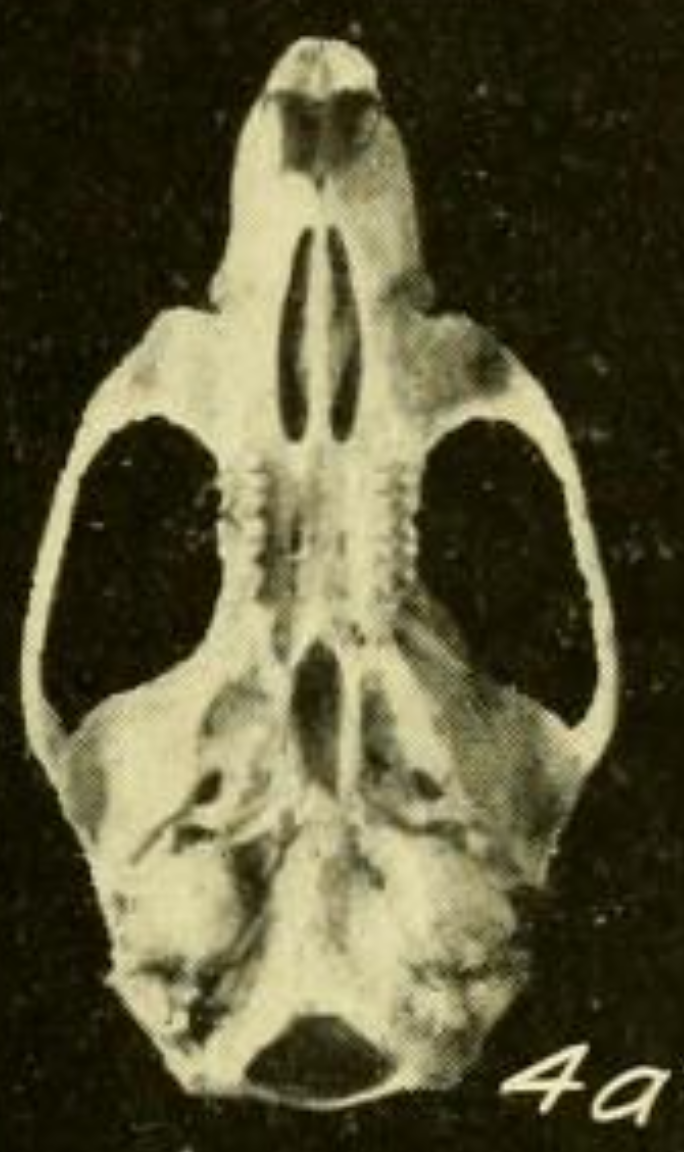
Skull of Oryzomys from Los Reyes, Michoacán (regillus Goldman, 1915)

In their 2009 review of western Mexican Oryzomys, Carleton and Arroyo-Cabrales classified Oryzomys albiventer as a separate species from lowland mexicanus on the basis of clear morphometric differentiation and offered some comments on the status of crinitus, regillus, and aztecus, including the holotypes of the three forms in their morphometric analyses. The holotypes of regillus and aztecus were at the upper end of the range of variation in their large series of mexicanus from the western lowlands, and crinitus clustered with specimens of O. peninsulae from the tip of the Baja California Peninsula. They suggested that regillus and aztecus may represent no more than robust upland populations of mexicanus, but could not exclude the possibility that they represent a different species. That crinitus, which occurs at over 2,000 m (6,600 ft) altitude in the Valley of Mexico, was the same species as peninsulae from the lowlands of the Baja California Peninsula they could not accept and they recommended further research to determine the relationships of crinitus. A specimen from inland Michoacán has Cytb data characteristic of mexicanus, but Hanson and colleagues did not have data for other interior Mexican Oryzomys.

The holotype of the species Oryzomys fulgens, which Thomas had described in 1893, has no more precise locality than "Mexico", but the Valley of Mexico has been suggested as its origin. It is a large, coarse-furred, bright reddish, long-tailed species with a broad skull with widely spreading zygomatic arches. Goldman wrote that it was similar to crinitus, but more intensely colored, and differed in the form of the interorbital region; he retained it as a separate species pending further investigations. Carleton and Arroyo-Cabrales noted that archival research may yet uncover the precise origin of O. fulgens, which could establish it as an older name for one of the other central Mexican Oryzomys.

=== Texas to Nicaragua ===
Taxonomic synonyms
- Oryzomys jalapae apatelius Eliot, 1904
- Oryzomys aquaticus J.A. Allen, 1891
- Hesperomys couesi Alston, 1877
- Oryzomys cozumelae Merriam, 1901 (Note: Merriam described Oryzomys cozumelae as new in both of his 1901 papers, but his Proceedings of the Biological Society of Washington article was published earlier (July 19) than the one in the Proceedings of the Washington Academy of Sciences (July 26); thus, the former is the original publication of this name.)
- Oryzomys goldmani Merriam, 1901
- Oryzomys jalapae J.A. Allen and Chapman, 1897
- Oryzomys mexicanus peragrus Merriam, 1901
- Oryzomys couesi pinicola Murie, 1932
- Oryzomys richardsoni J.A. Allen, 1910
- Oryzomys richmondi Merriam, 1901
- Oryzomys jalapae rufinus Merriam, 1901
- Oryzomys teapensis Merriam, 1901

Oryzomys populations from Texas to Nicaragua form a single Cytb clade, within which the average sequence divergence is 1.28%, and Hanson and colleagues proposed that the name Oryzomys couesi be restricted to this clade. These populations correspond to two subspecies recognized by Goldman (O. c. aquaticus and O. c. couesi) and an island form he retained as a species (O. cozumelae). Two other subspecies Goldman recognized, O. c. richmondi and O. c. peragrus, and a third, O. c. pinicola, that was described after Goldman's paper occur in the same region, but have not been studied genetically.

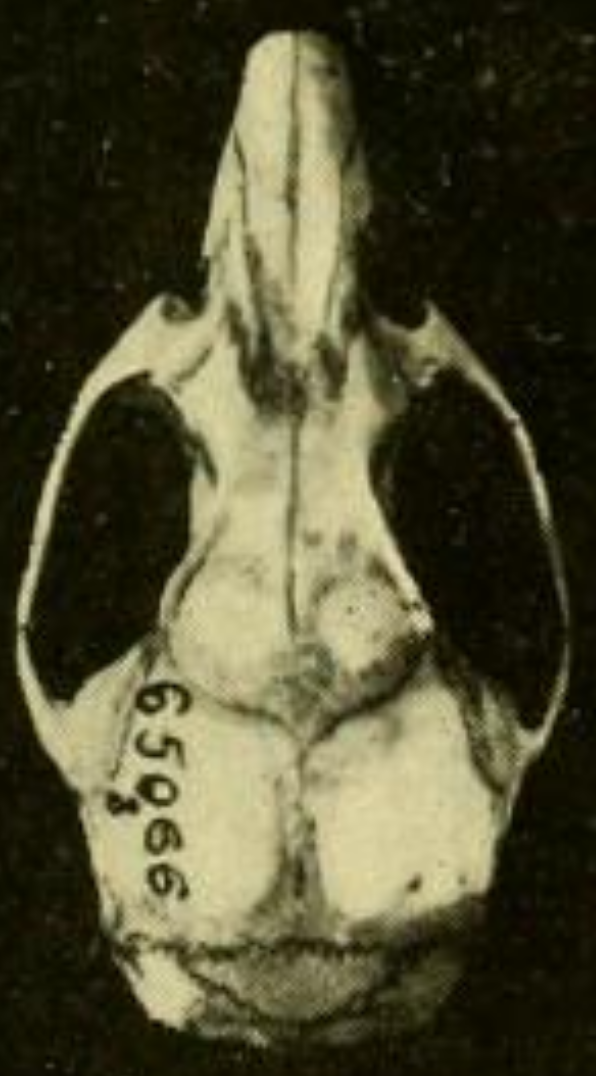
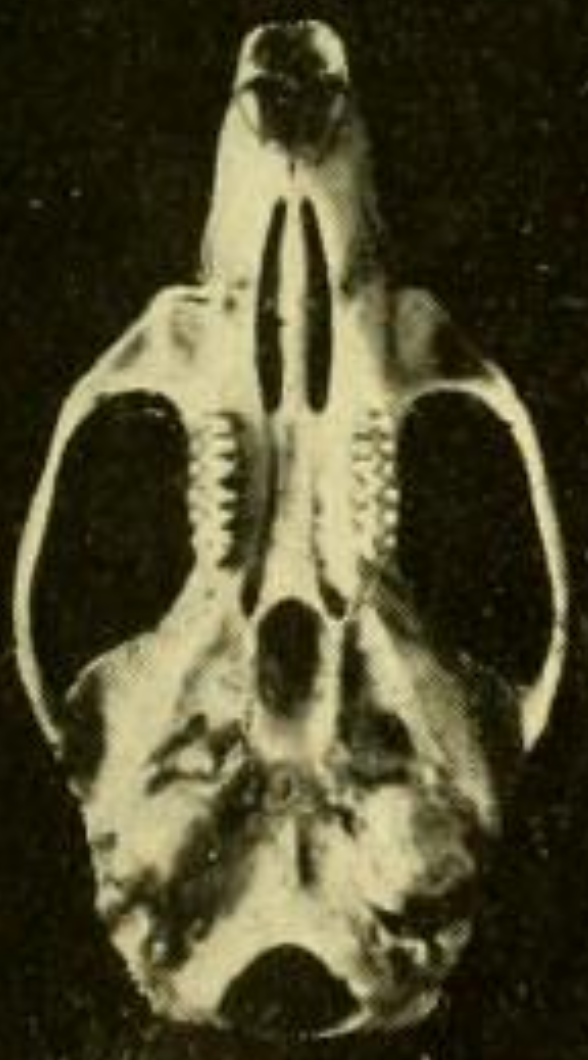
Skull of Oryzomys from Brownsville, Texas (aquaticus Allen, 1891)

The northernmost populations of Oryzomys couesi, those in southernmost Texas and nearby Tamaulipas, Mexico, are classified as the subspecies aquaticus, which was described as a separate species, Oryzomys aquaticus, in 1891. Here the range of O. couesi meets that of the marsh rice rat; in parts of Kenedy, Willacy and Cameron counties, Texas, and in far northeastern Tamaulipas, the two are sympatric (occur in the same places). In the contact zone, couesi occurs further inland, while the marsh rice rat lives along the coast. In experimental conditions, the two fail to interbreed and genetic analysis yields no evidence of gene flow or hybridization in the wild. Compared to populations further to the south, aquaticus is larger and paler and has a more robust skull. Specimens from Tamaulipas are slightly darker than those from Texas. The Cytb sequences of specimens of aquaticus form a separate group, but cluster among specimens of O. c. couesi from further south.

The form peragrus is known from further south in Mexico, in the Río Verde basin of San Luis Potosi, the state of Hidalgo, and far northern Veracruz. Late Pleistocene fossils of this form have been found in Cueva de Abre, Tamaulipas. According to Goldman, it is intermediate in color between O. c. aquaticus and O. c. couesi, but has a skull similar to that of aquaticus.

Goldman united populations ranging from northern Veracruz through eastern Mexico, Guatemala, Honduras, and Nicaragua south to far northwestern Costa Rica in the nominate subspecies, Oryzomys couesi couesi. He placed six other names as full synonyms of this form, which has its type locality in Guatemala—Oryzomys jalapae Allen and Chapman, 1897, from Veracruz; Oryzomys jalapae rufinus Merriam, 1901, from Veracruz; Oryzomys teapensis Merriam, 1901, from Tabasco; Oryzomys goldmani Merriam, 1901, from Veracruz; Oryzomys jalapae apatelius Eliot, 1904, from Veracruz; and Oryzomys richardsoni Allen, 1910, from Nicaragua. According to Goldman, individual variation within the subspecies is large, which has led to the large number of published synonyms, but populations from all parts of its range are essentially similar.

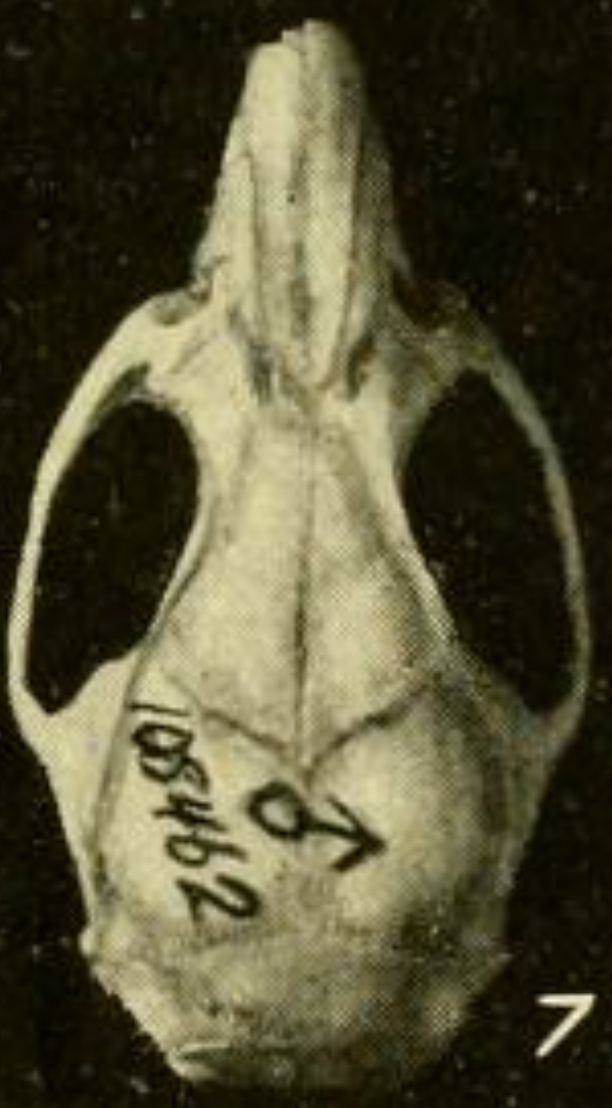
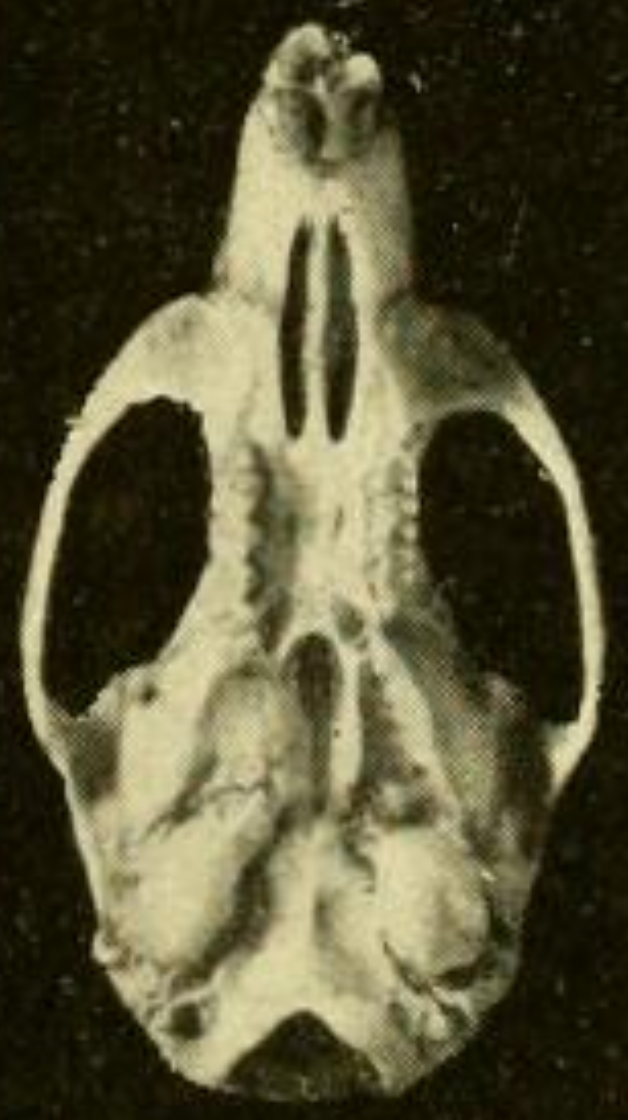
Skull of Oryzomys from Cozumel, Mexico (cozumelae Merriam, 1901)

The subspecies Oryzomys couesi pinicola was described in 1932 from a pine ridge in western British Honduras (now Belize); it is smaller and darker than nominate couesi, which also occurs in Belize, and has a more delicate skull. In 1901, Merriam described the Oryzomys of the island of Cozumel as a separate species, Oryzomys cozumelae, and Goldman kept it as such because of its large size, dark fur, and long tail. In 1965, however, Knox Jones and Timothy Lawlor judged the differences between cozumelae and mainland couesi trivial and found that cozumelae was inside the range of variation of mainland Oryzomys populations; accordingly, they demoted the island form to a subspecies. Mark Engstrom and colleagues, writing in 1989, reaffirmed this conclusion. For an island form, this population is highly genetically variable. In its Cytb sequence data, it falls among populations of nominate couesi. Oryzomys couesi is also found on Turneffe Atoll off the coast of Belize and Roatán off Honduras.

The Oryzomys of the eastern lowlands of Nicaragua was described as a separate species, Oryzomys richmondi, by Merriam in 1901, and Goldman retained it as a subspecies of O. couesi on the basis of its distinctly dark fur. In reviewing Nicaraguan Oryzomys in 1986, Jones and Engstrom did not keep richmondi as separate, because they thought the difference in color too small for the recognition of subspecies. Oryzomys dimidiatus, a small, dark Oryzomys with gray underparts, occurs with O. couesi in southeastern Nicaragua. According to Jones and Engstrom, rice rats from the island of Ometepe in Lake Nicaragua are distinctive in their large skull and small external measurements, with an especially short tail, soft fur that is orange-brown above and buffish below, and lack of sphenopalatine vacuities (openings in the roof of the mesopterygoid fossa, the gap behind the end of the bony palate). They considered that this population probably represented a separate subspecies, but declined to propose a new name because they had only one adult specimen. In Nicaragua, O. couesi occurs up to an altitude of 1,250 m (4,100 ft).

=== Costa Rica, Panama, and Colombia ===
Taxonomic synonyms
- Oryzomys azuerensis Bole, 1937
- Oryzomys gatunensis Goldman, 1912

Oryzomys from Costa Rica have historically been referred to O. c. couesi, but Hanson and colleagues found that two specimens from Refugio Nacional de Vida Silvestre Mixto Maquenque, northeastern Costa Rica, differed as much from other O. couesi (11.93% Cytb sequence divergence) as O. couesi differed from the marsh rice rat (11.30%). They suggested that these animals represented a species distinct from O. couesi, but were unable to resolve the correct name for the species because they could not examine samples of dimidiatus or richmondi.

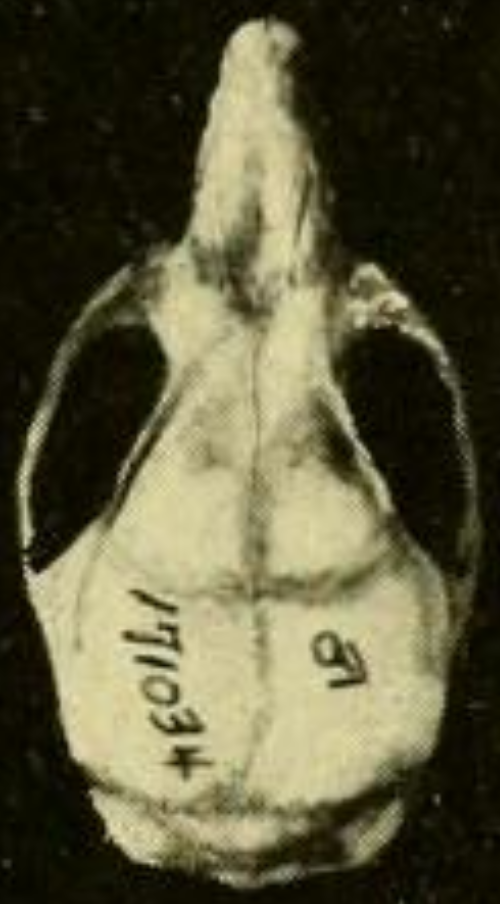
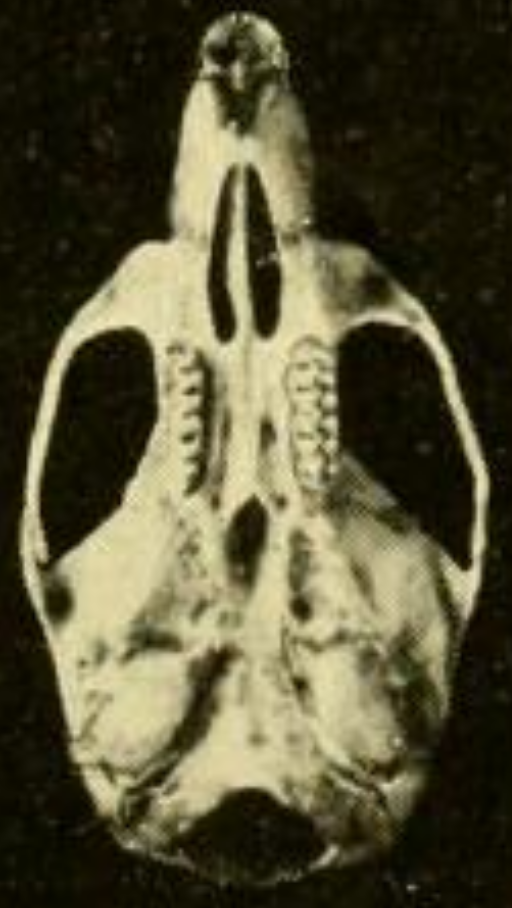
Skull of Oryzomys from Gatún, Panama (gatunensis Goldman, 1912)

Oryzomys is rare in Panama. Panamanian Oryzomys were first described by Goldman in 1912, who introduced the name Oryzomys gatunensis for a specimen from Gatún in the Canal Zone. In 1918, Goldman kept the animal as a separate species, remarking that it was similar to richmondi, but distinctive in the well-developed ridges along the margins of the interorbital region, the short interparietal bone (part of the roof of the braincase), and the long nasal bones. In 1937, Bole described another species of Panamanian Oryzomys, Oryzomys azuerensis from Paracoté, Veraguas Province. It is a brown form, lacking the reddish tones of nearby populations, and has a broad skull with a short rostrum (front part) and ridges on the interorbital region like those of gatunensis. Although Goldman recommended to him that gatunensis and azuerensis both be treated as subspecies of couesi, Bole described azuerensis as a species because it did not seem intermediate between the geographically closest forms, gatunensis and couesi, and was separated by a large gap from the nearest known populations of O. couesi in northwestern Costa Rica and southeastern Nicaragua. In a 1966 review of Panamanian mammals, Charles Handley reduced both gatunensis and azuerensis to subspecies of the marsh rice rat (in which O. couesi was included at the time), and when O. couesi was reinstated as a separate species these forms went with it. Specimens from near the type locality of azuerensis differ by about 7% in their Cytb sequences from other O. couesi, which suggests that they may represent a separate species. However, Hanson and colleagues did not reinstate azuerensis as a species, because they could not examine samples of gatunensis.

Oryzomys couesi was first reported from Colombia in 1987, when Philip Hershkovitz reported on its occurrence at Montería in Córdoba Department, northwestern Colombia. The Colombian specimen is ochraceous in color throughout and according to Hershkovitz almost identical to specimens from Guatemala, but distinctive in that the upper lip is white. He suggested that O. couesi may also be discovered in the Pacific lowlands of the Chocó in western Colombia.

=== Common names ===
Several common names have been proposed for Oryzomys couesi and the synonyms currently associated with it. Eliot in 1905 and Goldman in 1918 gave separate common names for each of the species and subspecies they recognized. Many authors have used "Coues' Rice Rat" or some variation thereof for O. couesi, but "Coues' Oryzomys" has also been used.

== Description ==
Measurements of different populations of Oryzomys couesi
Population	n (Note: Number of specimens measured.)	Total length	Tail	Hindfoot
Western Mexico to El Salvador
San José de Guaymas, Sonora (lambi) (Note: Only averages available.)	4	227	113	29
Escuinapa, Sinaloa (mexicanus)	10	251.4 (239–273)	137.4 (127–165)	28.9 (27–35)
Jalisco (mexicanus)	58	245.7 (195–301)	132.3 (102–160)	30.2 (26–34)
Nayarit (mexicanus)	62	244.8 (210–288)	125.1 (105–150)	30.5 (27–33)
Nenton, Guatemala (zygomaticus)	1	290	152	33
El Salvador	87	190–304	109–194	25–33
Interior Mexico
Morelos (aztecus)	3	307 (297–318)	161 (154–170)	34 (33–35)
Mexico City (crinitus)	2	307, 280	161, 148	37, 35
Michoacán (regillus)	3	308 (285–320)	168 (155–180)	35 (34–36)
Unknown (fulgens)	1	311	151	37.5 (Note: With claws.)
Texas to Nicaragua
Brownsville, Texas (aquaticus)	5	297 (283–310)	161 (138–180)	34.5 (32–38)
Rio Verde, San Luis Potosí (peragrus)	3	281 (265–294)	157 (143–167)	34 (33–35)
Orizaba, Veracruz (couesi)	7	263 (248–294)	148 (139–174)	33.1 (32–34.5)
Tumbala, Chiapas (couesi)	4	252 (242–265)	130 (127–135)	30.7 (30–31)
El Cayo, Belize (pinicola)	18	108 (96–128) (Note: Head and body length instead of total length.)	122 (107–146)	27 (24.6–29)
Cozumel (cozumelae)	6	306 (285–327)	172 (163–177)	34.3 (33–35.5)
Yaruca, Honduras (couesi)	10	267.5 (255–280)	138 (130–145)	29.1 (28–32)
San Antonio, Nicaragua (couesi)	25	264.9 (242–292)	135.6 (127–150)	28.8 (27–31)
Southeastern Nicaragua (richmondi)	10	275.8 (255–295)	137 (124–151)	30.9 (29–33.5)
Isla de Omotepe, Nicaragua	1	260	121	30
Costa Rica, Panama, and Colombia
Azuero, Panama (azuerensis)	1	203	107.5	30
Gatún, Panama (gatunensis)	1	224	115	31.5
Measurements are in millimeters and are in the form "average (minimum–maximum)", except where there are only one or two measured specimens.

O. couesi is a medium-sized to large rat with coarse fur that is buff to reddish above, becoming paler towards the sides and cheeks and darker on the rump and face. The underparts are white to buff. The fur is shorter, brighter, and more intense in color than in the marsh rice rat. The snout ends bluntly and the moderately large eyes show reddish eyeshine. The small ears are black on the outside and the inside is covered with short, gray to buff or red hairs. The long tail is dark brown above and white to light brown below. The feet are long and stout. On the forefeet, the ungual tufts (tufts of hair on the digits) are present. Many of the pads on the hindfeet are reduced, as are the ungual tufts, and small interdigital webs may be present in at least some specimens. Some of these traits are common adaptations to life in the water in oryzomyines. As in most other oryzomyines, females have eight mammae. Head and body length is 98 to 142 mm (3.9 to 5.6 in), tail length is 107 to 152 mm (4.2 to 6.0 in), hindfoot length is 27 to 33 mm (1.1 to 1.3 in), ear length is 13 to 18 mm (0.51 to 0.71 in), and body mass is 43 to 82 g (1.5 to 2.9 oz). Studies in Texas and El Salvador found that males are slightly larger than females.

The stomach has the characteristic pattern of sigmodontines (unilocular-hemiglandular): it is not split in two chambers by an incisura angularis and the front part (antrum) is covered by a glandular epithelium. The gall bladder is absent, a synapomorphy (shared-derived character) of Oryzomyini. The karyotype includes 56 chromosomes and a fundamental number of 56 autosomal arms (2n = 56, FNa = 56). The autosomes include 26 pairs of acrocentric chromosomes, with a long and a very short arm, and one medium-sized submetacentric pair, with one arm shorter than the other. The X chromosome is either acrocentric, with a long and a short arm, or subtelocentric, with a long and a vestigial arm. The form of the sex chromosomes has been used to distinguish the marsh rice rat from Oryzomys couesi, but there are no consistent differences between the two.

As is characteristic of Sigmodontinae, Oryzomys couesi has a complex penis, with the baculum (penis bone) ending in three cartilaginous digits at its tip. The outer surface of the penis is mostly covered by small spines, but there is a broad band of nonspinous tissue. The papilla (nipple-like projection) on the dorsal (upper) side of the penis is covered with small spines, a character Oryzomys couesi shares only with Oligoryzomys and the marsh rice rat among oryzomyines examined. On the urethral process, located in the crater at the end of the penis, a fleshy process (the subapical lobule) is present; it is absent in all other oryzomyines with studied penes except the marsh rice rat and Holochilus brasiliensis.

=== Skull ===
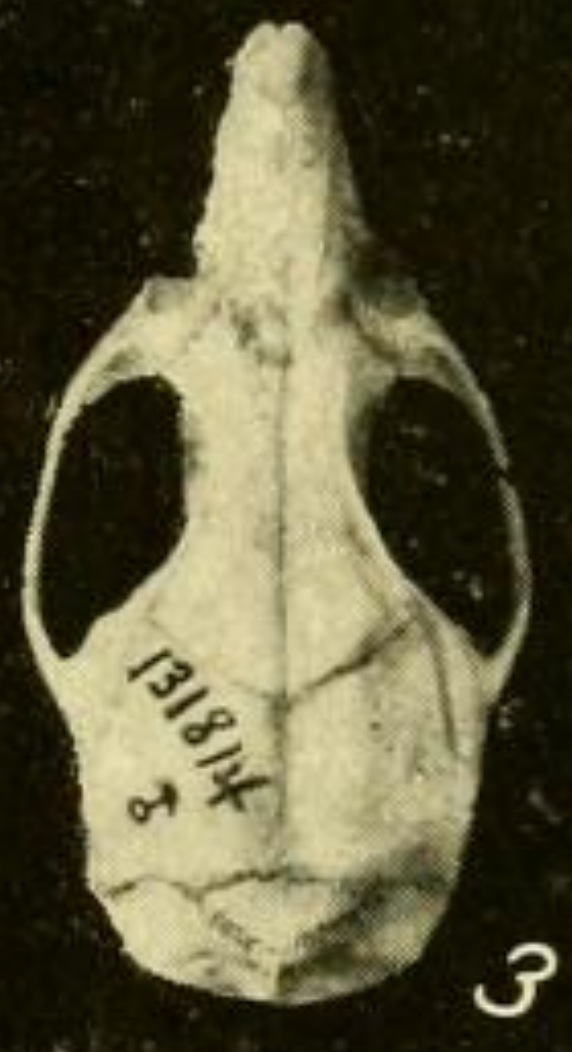
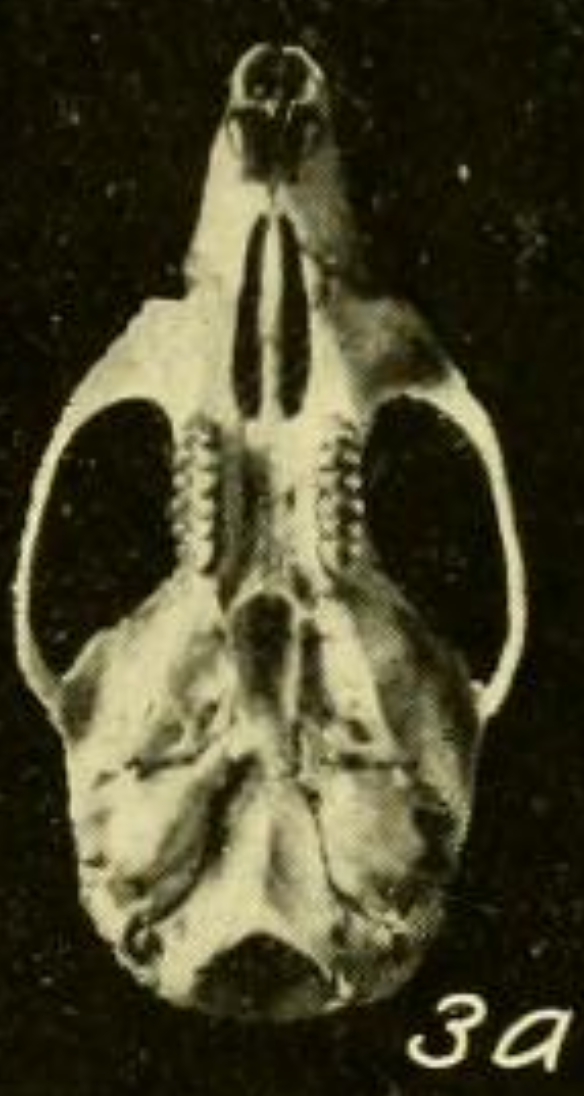
Skull of Oryzomys from Yaruca, Honduras (couesi Alston, 1877)

The nasal and premaxillary bones do not extend back beyond the point where the lacrimal, frontal, and maxillary bones meet. The zygomatic plate, the flattened front part of the zygomatic arch, is broad and develops a notch at its front end. The plate's back margin is located before the first upper molar. The jugal bone, part of the zygomatic arch, is reduced, as usual in oryzomyines. The sphenopalatine foramen, a foramen (opening) at the side of the skull above the molars, is small; it is much larger in the marsh rice rat. The narrowest part of the interorbital region is towards the front and the edges are lined by prominent shelves. The parietal bones extend to the sides of the braincase. The interparietal bone is narrow and wedge-shaped, so that the parietal and squamosal bones meet extensively.

The incisive foramina, openings in the front part of the palate, reach backward between the molars. The palate is long, extending substantially beyond the third molars, the usual condition in oryzomyines. The back part, near the third molars, is usually perforated by prominent posterolateral palatal pits, which are recessed into fossae (depressions). Sphenopalatine vacuities are usually absent, but have been reported in some populations. There is no alisphenoid strut, an extension of the alisphenoid bone that in some oryzomyines separates two foramina in the skull. The condition of the arteries in the head is highly derived. The subsquamosal fenestra, an opening in the back part of the skull determined by the shape of the squamosal bone, is present. The squamosal lacks a suspensory process that contacts the tegmen tympani, the roof of the tympanic cavity, a defining character of oryzomyines. There are some openings in the mastoid bone.

In the mandible (lower jaw), the mental foramen, an opening just before the first molar, opens sidewards, not upwards as in a few other oryzomyines. The upper and lower masseteric ridges, which anchor some of the chewing muscles, join at a point below the first molar and do not extend forward beyond that point. The capsular process, a raising of the bone of the back of the mandible that houses the back end of the incisor, is large.

=== Teeth ===
The dental formula is 1.0.0.31.0.0.3 × 2 = 16 (one upper and one lower incisor and three upper and three lower molars on each side of the jaws), as usual in muroid rodents. The upper incisors are opisthodont, with the chewing edge located behind the vertical plane of the teeth. The molars are bunodont, with the cusps higher than the connecting crests, and brachydont, low-crowned, as in most other oryzomyines. Many accessory crests, including the mesoloph on the upper molars and the mesolophid on the lower molars, are present, another trait O. couesi shares with most but not all other oryzomyines. The flexi and flexids (valleys between the cusps and crests) at the labial (outer) side of the molars are closed by cingula (ridges).

On the first and second upper molars, the flexi do not extend to the midline of the molars. The anterocone, the front cusp of the upper first molar, is not divided in two by an indentation at its front (anteromedian flexus). A crest, the anteroloph, is present behind the labial cuspule. As in most oryzomyines, the upper molars all have one root on the inner (lingual) side and two on the outer (labial) side; in addition, the first upper molar usually has another small labial root.

On the first lower molar, the labial and lingual conules of the anteroconid, the frontmost cusp, are separated by an anteromedian fossette. The second lower molar bears a crest, the anterolophid, before the two cusps, the protoconid and metaconid, that form the front edge of the molar in some other oryzomyines. There is a distinct ridge (anterolabial cingulum) at the outer front (anterolabial) edge of the molar, before the protoconid. The third lower molar also bears an anterolophid and an anterolabial cingulum. The first lower molar has large roots at the front and back of the tooth and two smaller ones in between, at the labial and lingual side. The second and third lowers molars have two large roots, one at the front and one at the back.

=== Postcranial skeleton ===
As usual in oryzomyines, there are twelve ribs. The first rib articulates with both the last cervical (neck) and first thoracic (chest) vertebrae, a synapomorphy of the Sigmodontinae. Anapophyses, processes at the back of a vertebra, are absent from the fifth lumbar. Between the second and third caudal vertebrae, hemal arches (small bones) are present with a spinous back border. The entepicondylar foramen is absent, as in all members of the Sigmodontinae; if present, as in some other rodents, this foramen perforates the distal (far) end of the humerus (upper arm bone).

== Ecology and behavior ==
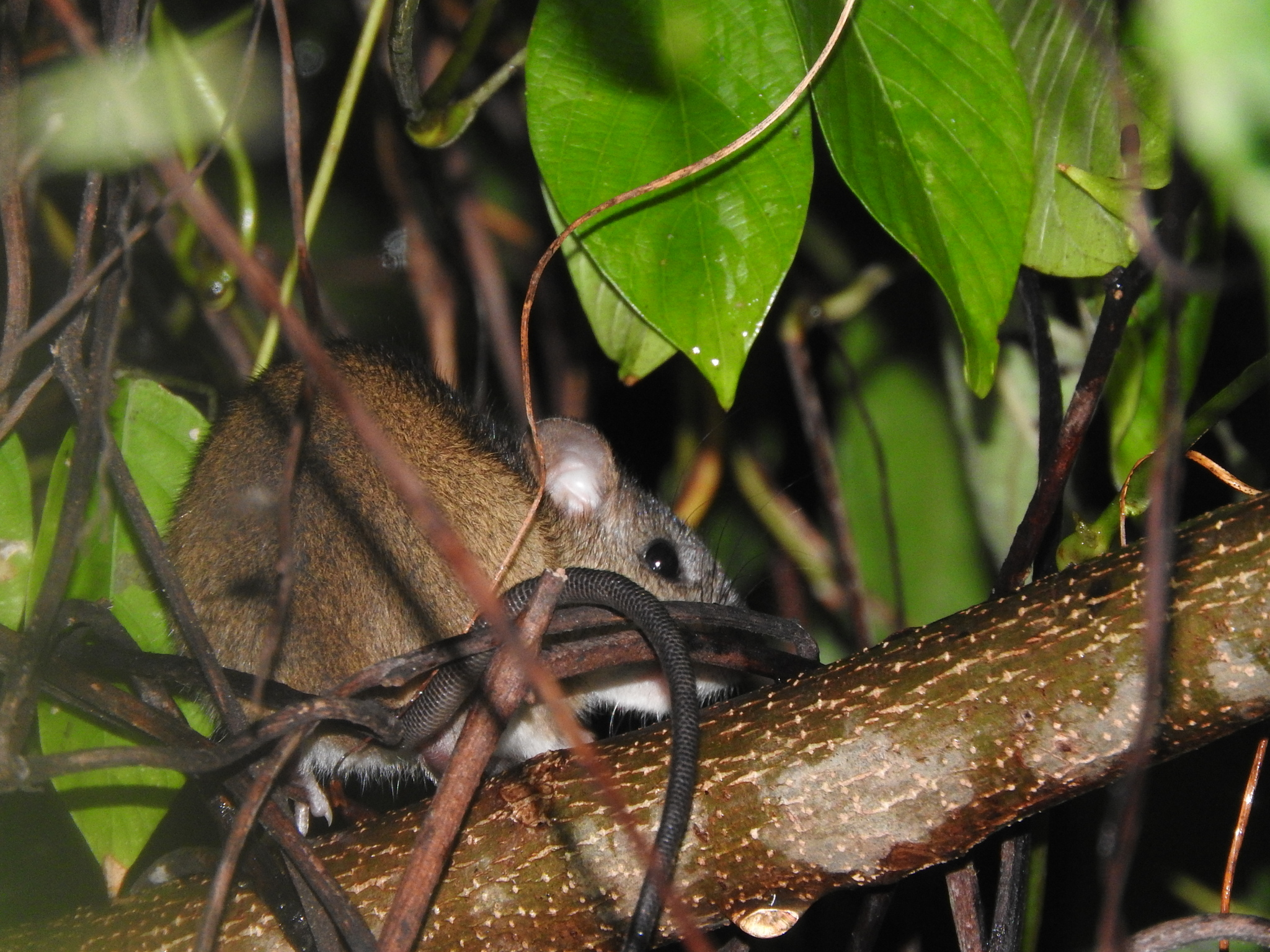
O. couesi under vegetation

The distribution of Oryzomys couesi extends from southern Texas and central Sonora, but not the central plateau of Mexico, through Central America south and east to northwestern Colombia; see under "Taxonomy" for details. The species has also been found in late Pleistocene cave deposits in Mexico and Honduras. It is common in watery habitats, such as marshes and small streams, but also occurs in forests and shrublands with sufficient cover. In addition, it is found in sugarcane and rice fields. In Texas, it occurs in marsh vegetation along resacas (oxbow lakes) and in Veracruz, it has even been found on the dry coastal plain among shrubs. It occurs from 2,300 m (7,500 ft) altitude down to sea level. On Cozumel, the proportion of juveniles and females is higher near roads that function as habitat edges. Cozumel rice rats rarely cross roads, which may isolate subpopulations on the island.

Oryzomys couesi lives on the ground and is semiaquatic, spending much time in the water, as Alston in his original description already recognized, but is also a good climber. A study in Costa Rica found that O. couesi is an excellent swimmer, diving well and using its tail to propel itself. It is probably able to forage underwater, which may help differentiate its niche from that of the ecologically similar cotton rat Sigmodon hirsutus, which also swims well, but does not dive. When disturbed, O. couesi will enter the water and swim away. It is primarily active during the night. Oryzomys couesi builds globular nests of woven vegetation suspended among reeds, about 1 m (3.3 ft) above the water or the ground; in Texas, larger individuals make larger nests. It does not usually make its own runways in vegetation, but may use those of other rodents, such as cotton rats.

Population densities range from 5 to 30 per ha (2 to 12 per acre). On Cozumel, density is around 14.5 to 16.5 per ha (5.9 to 6.7 per acre), but shows large seasonal variation. In western Mexico, one study found densities of 3 per ha (1.2 per acre) in cloud forest and 1 per ha (0.4 per acre) in a disturbed area. In 24 hours, male Texas O. couesi move up to 153 m (502 ft) and females up to 126 m (413 ft). The diet includes both plant material, including seeds and green parts, and animals, including small fish, crustaceans, snails, insects like ants and beetles, and other invertebrates. It probably breeds around the year and after a pregnancy of 21 to 28 days, the female produces litters of two to seven young, with an average of 3.8, according to Reid's Mammals of Central America & Southeast Mexico. In 28 pregnant females from Nicaragua, litter size varied from one to eight, averaging 4.4. The young become reproductively active when seven weeks old and the life cycle is short.

The introduced snake Boa constrictor preys on O. couesi on Cozumel. Parasites recorded on O. couesi in Veracruz include unidentified ticks, mites, fleas, and fly larvae. The flea Polygenis odiosus was found on an Oryzomys couesi from Cozumel. Out of ten O. couesi in San Luis Potosí, five each were infected by the nematode worms Hassalstrongylus musculi and H. bocqueti, with about 25 worms per rat, and two were infected by one or two cestodes of the genus Raillietina. The mites Eubrachylaelaps circularis and Gigantolaelaps boneti have been found on Oryzomys couesi in Oaxaca, the sucking louse Hoplopleura oryzomydis in Nicaragua, the mites Laelaps oryzomydis, Echinonyssus microchelae, Ornithonyssus bacoti, Prolistrophorus frontalis, and Prolistrophorus bakeri in Colima, and the apicomplexan Eimeria couesii in Mexico. The species is infected by two hantaviruses—Catacamas virus in Honduras and Playa de Oro virus in western Mexico—which are related to the Bayou virus infecting the marsh rice rat, a common cause of hantavirus infections in the United States. No hantavirus infections in humans have been linked to O. couesi hantaviruses, however. Chiapas O. couesi easily survive experimental infection with several arboviruses, including the Venezuelan equine encephalitis virus, suggesting that the species may serve as a reservoir for that virus.

== Conservation status ==
The IUCN lists Oryzomys couesi as "Least Concern", because it is a widely distributed, common species with broad habitat tolerance that occurs in many protected areas. Habitat destruction, such as drainage of wetlands, may threaten some populations. In many areas, it is so common that it is considered a plague species. Populations even persist in the Valley of Mexico, as evidenced by a photograph published in 2006. However, the species is listed as threatened in Texas, where its distribution is very limited, because of habitat loss. In 1979, Benson and Gehlbach estimated the size of the Texas population to be about 15,000. A 2001 study predicted that climate change would drive the Texas population to extinction, because no suitable habitats would continue to exist. The Cozumel population has declined substantially since the mid-1980s, perhaps due to habitat disturbance and predation by introduced species.

== Literature cited ==
- Allen, J.A. 1891. Notes on new or little-known North American mammals, based on recent additions to the collection of mammals in the American Museum of Natural History. Bulletin of the American Museum of Natural History 3:263–310.
- Allen, J.A. 1897. Further notes on mammals collected in Mexico by Dr. Audley C. Buller, with descriptions of new species. Bulletin of the American Museum of Natural History 9:47–57.
- Allen, J.A. 1910. Additional mammals from Nicaragua. Bulletin of the American Museum of Natural History 28:87–115.
- Allen, J.A. and Chapman, F.M. 1897. On a collection of mammals from Jalapa and Las Vigas, state of Vera Cruz, Mexico. Bulletin of the American Museum of Natural History 9:197–208.
- Alston, E.R. 1877 ["1876"]. On two new species of Hesperomys. Proceedings of the Zoological Society of London 1876(4):755–757.
- Alston, E.R. 1882. Biologia centrali-americana. Mammalia. R.H. Porter, 220 pp.
- Baker, R.H. 1951. Mammals from Tamaulipas, Mexico. University of Kansas Publications, Museum of Natural History 5:207–215.
- Barnard, W.P., Ernst, J.V. and Stevens, R.O. 1971. Eimeria palustris sp. n. and Isospora hammondi sp. n. (Coccidia: Eimeriidae) from the marsh rice rat, Oryzomys palustris (Harlan). The Journal of Parasitology 57(6):1293–1296. (subscription required)
- Benson, D.E. and Gehlbach, F.R. 1979. Ecological and taxonomic notes on the rice rat (Oryzomys couesi) in Texas. Journal of Mammalogy 60(1):225–228. (subscription required)
- Bole, B.J. Jr. 1937. Annotated list of the mammals of the Mariato River District of the Azuero Peninsula. Scientific Publications of the Cleveland Museum of Natural History 7:140–196.
- Burt, W.H. 1934. A new rice rat (Oryzomys) from Sonora, Mexico. Proceedings of the Biological Society of Washington 47:107–108.
- Burt, W.H. and Stirton, R.A. 1961. The mammals of El Salvador. Miscellaneous Publications of the Museum of Zoology, University of Michigan 117:1–69.
- Cameron, G.N. and Scheel, D. Getting warmer: Effect of global climate change on distribution of rodents in Texas. Journal of Mammalogy 82(3):652–680. (subscription required)
- Carleton, M.D. and Arroyo-Cabrales, J. 2009. Review of the Oryzomys couesi complex (Rodentia: Cricetidae: Sigmodontinae) in Western Mexico. Bulletin of the American Museum of Natural History 331:94–127.
- Carleton, M.D. and Musser, G.G. 1984. Muroid rodents. pp. 289–379 in Anderson. S. and Jones, J.K. Jr. (eds.). Orders and families of Recent mammals of the world. John Wiley and Sons, New York, 686 pp.
- Chu, Y.-K., Owen, R.D., Sánchez-Hernández, C., Romero-Almarez, M. de L. and Jonsson, C.B. 2008. Genetic characterization and phylogeny of a hantavirus from Western Mexico. Virus Research 131:180–188. (subscription required)
- Cook, W.M., Timm, R.M. and Hyman, D.E. 2001. Swimming ability in three Costa Rican dry forest rodents. Revista de Biología Tropical 49(3–4):1177–1181.
- Dalquest, W.W. and Roth, E. 1970. Late Pleistocene mammals from a cave in Tamaulipas, Mexico. The Southwestern Naturalist 15(2):217–230. (subscription required)
- Deardorff, E.R., Forrester, N.L., Travassos da Rosa, A.P., Estrada-Franco, J.G., Navarro-Lopez, R., Tesh, R.B. and Weaver, S.C. 2009. Experimental infection of potential reservoir hosts with Venezuelan equine encephalitis virus, Mexico. Emerging Infectious Diseases 15(4):519–525.
- Deardorff, E.R., Forrester, N.L., Travassos da Rosa, A.P., Estrada-Franco, J.G., Navarro-Lopez, R., Tesh, R.B. and Weaver, S.C. 2010. Short report: Experimental infections of Oryzomys couesi with sympatric arboviruses from Mexico. American Journal of Tropical Medicine and Hygiene 82(2):350–353.
- Dickinson, E.C. 2005. The Proceedings of the Zoological Society of London, 1859–1900: an exploration of breaks between calendar years of publication. Journal of Zoology 266(4):427–430. (subscription required)
- Duff, A. and Lawson, A. 2004. Mammals of the World: A checklist. New Haven: A & C Black, 312 pp. ISBN 0-7136-6021-X
- Eckerlin, R.P. 2005. Fleas (Siphonaptera) of the Yucatan Peninsula (Campeche, Quintana Roo, and Yucatan), Mexico. Caribbean Journal of Science 41(1):152–157.
- Eliot, D.G. 1904. Descriptions of apparently new species and subspecies of mammals and a new generic name proposed. Field Columbian Museum Zoological Series 3:263–270.
- Eliot, D.G. 1905. A checklist of mammals of the North American continent, the West Indies and the neighboring seas. Field Columbian Museum Zoological Series 6:1–761.
- Emerson, K.C. 1971. Records of a collection of Mallophaga and Anoplura from Nicaraguan mammals. Journal of the Kansas Entomological Society 44(3):332–334. (subscription required)
- Engstrom, M.D., Schmidt, C.A., Morales, J.C. and Dowler, R.C. 1989. Records of mammals from Isla Cozumel, Quintana Roo, Mexico. The Southwestern Naturalist 34(3):413–415. (subscription required)
- Estébanes-González, M.L. and Cervantes, F.A. 2005. Mites and ticks associated with some small mammals in Mexico. International Journal of Acarology 31(1):23–37. (subscription required)
- Estébanes-González, M.L., Sánchez-Hernández, C., Romero-Almaraz, M. de L. and Schnell, G.D. 2011. Ácaros parásitos de roedores de Playa de Oro, Colima, México. Acta Zoológica Mexicana 27(1):169–176 (in Spanish).
- Fuentes-Montemayor, E., Cuarón, A.D., Vázquez-Domínguez, E., Benítez-Malvido, J., Valenzuela-Galván, D. and Andresen, E. 2009. Living on the edge: roads and edge effects on small mammal populations. Journal of Animal Ecology 78:857–865. (subscription required)
- Genoways, H.H. and Jones, J.K. Jr. 1971. Second specimen of Oryzomys dimidiatus. Journal of Mammalogy 52:833–834.
- Goldman, E.A. 1912. Descriptions of twelve new species and subspecies of mammals from Panama. Smithsonian Miscellaneous Collections 56(36):1–11.
- Goldman, E.A. 1915. Five new rice rats of the genus Oryzomys from Middle America. Proceedings of the Biological Society of Washington 27:127–130.
- Goldman, E.A. 1918. The rice rats of North America. North American Fauna 43:1–100.
- Haiduk, M.W., Bickham, J.W. and Schmidly, D.J. 1979. Karyotypes of six species of Oryzomys from Mexico and Central America. Journal of Mammalogy 60(3):610–615. (subscription required)
- Hall, E.R. 1960. Oryzomys couesi only subspecifically different from the marsh rice rat, Oryzomys palustris. The Southwestern Naturalist 5(3):171–173. (subscription required)
- Hall, E.R. and Dalquest, W.W. 1963. The mammals of Veracruz. University of Kansas Publications, Museum of Natural History 14:165–362.
- Handley, C.O. Jr. 1966. Checklist of the mammals of Panama. pp. 753–795 in Wenzel, R.L. and Tipton, V.J. (eds.). Ectoparasites of Panama. Chicago: Field Museum of Natural History, xii + 861 pp.
- Hanson, J.D., Indorf, J.L., Swier, V.J. and Bradley, R.D. 2010. Molecular divergence within the Oryzomys palustris complex: evidence for multiple species (abstract only). Journal of Mammalogy 91(2):336–347.
- Harris, W.P. Jr. 1943. A list of mammals from Costa Rica. Occasional Papers of the Museum of Zoology, University of Michigan 476:1–15.
- Hershkovitz, P. 1987. First South American record of Coues' marsh rice rat, Oryzomys couesi. Journal of Mammalogy 68(1):152–154. (subscription required)
- Hooper, E.T. and Musser, G.G. 1964. The glans penis in Neotropical cricetines (Family Muridae) with comments on classification of muroid rodents. Miscellaneous Publications of the University of Michigan Museum of Zoology 123:1–57.
- Jones, J.K. Jr. and Engstrom, M.D. 1986. Synopsis of the rice rats (genus Oryzomys) of Nicaragua. Occasional Papers, The Museum, Texas Tech University 103:1–23.
- Jones, J.K. Jr. and Lawlor, T.E. 1965. Mammals from Isla Cozumel, México, with description of a new species of harvest mouse. University of Kansas Publications, Museum of Natural History 16:409–419.
- Jones, J.K. Jr., Carter, D.C. and Webster, W.D. 1983. Records of mammals from Hidalgo, Mexico. The Southwestern Naturalist 28(3):378–380. (subscription required)
- Kays, R.W. and Wilson, D.E. 2000. Mammals of North America. Princeton and Oxford: Princeton University Press, 240 pp. ISBN 0-691-07012-1
- Koopman, K.F. 1959. The zoogeographical limits of the West Indies. Journal of Mammalogy 40(2):236–240. (subscription required)
- Linzey, A. V.; Timm, R.; Woodman, N.; Matson, J. & Samudio, R. (2017) [errata version of 2016 assessment]. "Oryzomys couesi". IUCN Red List of Threatened Species. 2016 e.T15592A115128044.
- Medellín, X.L. and Medellín, R.A. 2006. Oryzomys couesi (Alston, 1877). pp. 709–710 in Ceballos, G. and Oliva, G. (eds.). Los mamíferos silvestres de México. Mexico City: Comisión Nacional para el Conocimiento y Uso de la Biodiversidad and Fondo de Cultura Económica, 986 pp. ISBN 978-970-9000-30-6
- Merriam, C.H. 1901a. Six new mammals from Cozumel Island, Yucatan. Proceedings of the Biological Society of Washington 14:99–104.
- Merriam, C.H. 1901b. Synopsis of the rice rats (genus Oryzomys) of the United States and Mexico. Proceedings of the Washington Academy of Sciences 3:273–295.
- Milazzo, M.L., Cajimat, M.N., Hanson, J.D., Bradley, R.D., Quintana, M., Sherman, C., Velásquez, R.T. and Fulhorst, C.F. 2006. Catacamas virus, a hantaviral species naturally associated with Oryzomys couesi (Coues' oryzomys) in Honduras. American Journal of Tropical Medicine and Hygiene 75(5):1003–1010.
- Murie, A. 1932. A new Oryzomys from a pine ridge in British Honduras. Occasional Papers of the Museum of Zoology, University of Michigan 245:1–3.
- Murie, A. 1935. Mammals from Guatemala and British Honduras. Miscellaneous Publications of the Museum of Zoology, University of Michigan 26:1–30.
- Musser, G.G. and Carleton, M.D. 2005. Superfamily Muroidea. pp. 894–1531 in Wilson, D.E. and Reeder, D.M. (eds.). Mammal Species of the World: a taxonomic and geographic reference. 3rd ed. Baltimore: The Johns Hopkins University Press, 2 vols., 2142 pp. ISBN 978-0-8018-8221-0
- Platt, S.G., Rainwater, T.R., Miller, B.W. and Miller, C.M. 2000. Notes on the mammals of Turneffe Atoll, Belize. Caribbean Journal of Science 36(1–2):166–168.
- Poole, A.J. and Schantz, V.S. 1942. Catalog of the type specimens of mammals in the United States National Museum, including the Biological Surveys collection. Bulletin of the United States National Museum 178:1–705.
- Reid, F. 2006. A Field Guide to Mammals of North America, North of Mexico. 4th ed. Houghton Mifflin Harcourt, 579 pp. ISBN 978-0-395-93596-5
- Reid, F. 2009. A Field Guide to the Mammals of Central America and Southeast Mexico. 2nd edition. Oxford University Press US, 346 pp. ISBN 978-0-19-534322-9
- Sánchez H., J., Ochoa G., J. and Voss, R.S. 2001. Rediscovery of Oryzomys gorgasi (Rodentia: Muridae) with notes on taxonomy and natural history. Mammalia 65:205–214. (subscription required)
- Schmidly, D.J. and Davis, W.B. 2004. The mammals of Texas. 2nd edition. University of Texas Press, 501 pp. ISBN 978-0-292-70241-7
- Schmidt, C.A. and Engstrom, M.D. 1994. Genic variation and systematics of rice rats (Oryzomys palustris species group) in southern Texas and northeastern Tamaulipas, Mexico. Journal of Mammalogy 75(4):914–928. (subscription required)
- Thomas, O. 1893. Notes on some Mexican Oryzomys. Annals and Magazine of Natural History (6)11:402–405.
- Underwood, H.T., Owen, J.G. and Engstrom, M.D. 1986. Endohelminths of three species of Oryzomys (Rodentia: Cricetidae) from San Luis Potosi, Mexico. The Southwestern Naturalist 31(3):410–411. (subscription required)
- Vázquez, L.B., Medellín, R.A. and Cameron, G.N. 2000. Population and community ecology of small rodents in montane forest of western Mexico. Journal of Mammalogy 81(1):77–85. (subscription required)
- Vega, R., Vázquez-Domínguez, E., Mejía-Puente, A. and Cuaro, A.D. 2004. Unexpected high levels of genetic variability and the population structure of an island endemic rodent (Oryzomys couesi cozumelae). Biological Conservation 137:210–222. (subscription required)
- Weksler, M. 2006. Phylogenetic relationships of oryzomyine rodents (Muroidea: Sigmodontinae): separate and combined analyses of morphological and molecular data. Bulletin of the American Museum of Natural History 296:1–149.
- Weksler, M., Percequillo, A.R. and Voss, R.S. 2006. Ten new genera of oryzomyine rodents (Cricetidae: Sigmodontinae). American Museum Novitates 3537:1–29.
- Woodman, N. 1995. Morphological variation between Pleistocene and Recent samples of Cryptotis (Insectivora: Soricidae) from the Yucatan Peninsula, Mexico. Journal of Mammalogy 76(1):223–231. (subscription required)
- Woodman, N. and Croft, D. 2005. Fossil shrews from Honduras and their significance for late glacial evolution in body size (Mammalia: Soricidae: Cryptotis). Fieldiana Geology 51:1–30.
