= Playa de Oro virus =

Virus classification
- (unranked): Virus
- Realm: Riboviria
- Kingdom: Orthornavirae
- Phylum: Negarnaviricota
- Class: Bunyaviricetes
- Order: Elliovirales
- Family: Hantaviridae
- Genus: Orthohantavirus
- Species: incertae sedis
- Virus: Playa de Oro virus

Species of virus

Playa de Oro virus (OROV) is a probable species of orthohantavirus found in the rodents Oryzomys couesi and Sigmodon mascotensis in the Mexican state of Colima. The former is thought to be the main host. The sequences of parts of the virus's RNA-based genome have been determined; they differ by 7–10% in amino acid composition and 22–24% in nucleotide composition from closely related viruses.

Playa de Oro virus was identified as a new species in 2008 and is most closely related to Bayou virus, Catacamas virus, Muleshoe virus, and Black Creek Canal virus, found in other species of Oryzomys and Sigmodon. Catacamas virus is found in a different population of Oryzomys couesi, and the presence of different viruses in these two species has been used as an argument for classifying the two populations of the host as separate species.

== History and occurrence ==
Playa de Oro virus was first identified in rodents collected in 2004 as part of a survey of wild mammals at Playa de Oro in Manzanillo, Colima, western Mexico. The discovery was published in 2008 by Yong-Kyu Chu and colleagues. Among 600 small mammals, antibodies against the hantavirus Sin Nombre virus were found in 23 individuals (out of 358 studied) of Oryzomys couesi, a rice rat that was the most common species found, six (out of 87) of the cotton rat Sigmodon mascotensis, and one (out of 77) of the pygmy mouse Baiomys musculus. In addition, twelve O. couesi and one S. mascotensis yielded hantavirus RNA. Viruses were found in males more often than in females. Because the amino acid sequences in sequenced parts of the virus's genome differed by as much as 7 to 10% from closely related hantaviruses, Chu and colleagues identified the virus found at Playa de Oro as a new species, called Playa de Oro virus or OROV. Although the authors could not prove that the virus fulfilled all the criteria for identifying a new virus species, they argued that it was likely that it did fulfill those criteria. It is currently treated as a probable species in the genus Hantavirus.

== Virology ==
Hantaviruses have a genome that consists of three segments of single-stranded, negative-sense RNA (see RNA virus: Replication), called the large (L), medium (M), and small (S) segments. The entire S segment and a fragment of the M segment have been sequenced.

The S segment consists of 1953 bases, of which 1287 (starting at position 43) code for the nucleocapsid protein. In addition, a second 192-base open reading frame occurs in the middle of this sequence (starting at position 122), as in several other hantaviruses. Among three specimens of O. couesi, the sequence in this segment differed by only 1%, and all changes were silent mutations. The amino acids of the S segment differ by 7 to 10% from those of the related hantaviruses Bayou virus (BAYV; from the marsh rice rat, Oryzomys palustris), Catacamas virus (CATV; from a Honduras population of Oryzomys couesi), and Black Creek Canal virus (BCCV; from the hispid cotton rat, Sigmodon hispidus). The nucleotide sequence differs by 24% from those viruses.

Among 1537-base fragments of the sequence of the M segment, several variable sites were observed, including some non-silent mutations. The sequence differs by 8 to 10% from BAYV, CATV, and BCCV in terms of amino acids and by 22% in terms of nucleotides.

=== Epidemiology and effects ===
Because OROV occurs frequently in Oryzomys couesi, Chu and colleagues suggested that it is the primary host of the virus and that infections in Sigmodon mascotensis are the result of spillover between these two rodent species, which occur closely together. Hantavirus pulmonary syndrome, the disease caused by hantaviruses such as Sin Nombre virus, has never been reported in Mexico, but antibodies against hantaviruses have been found in human blood samples in Yucatán and various wild rodents are known to be reservoirs of hantavirus species. Thus, there is a potential risk of OROV infection in humans. Before the discovery of OROV, one hantavirus species had been identified in Mexico—El Moro Canyon virus from the small rodent Reithrodontomys megalotis.

=== Relationships ===
According to phylogenetic analyses based on the sequences of both the S and M segments, OROV is most closely related to the clade formed by BAYV, CATV, BCCV, and Muleshoe virus (MUL; from the hispid cotton rat). In 2009, Piet Maes and colleagues proposed that the closely related BAYV, BCCV, and MUL be united into a single species. Chu and colleagues were surprised to find that the same species, Oryzomys couesi, harbored different viruses (OROV and CATV), though noted that the subspecies infected by the two viruses were different. In 2010, Delton Hanson and colleagues suggested on the basis of various lines of evidence, including the presence of different hantaviruses, that western Mexican populations of Oryzomys couesi represent a different species, Oryzomys mexicanus.
