= Catacamas virus =

Virus classification
- (unranked): Virus
- Realm: Riboviria
- Kingdom: Orthornavirae
- Phylum: Negarnaviricota
- Class: Bunyaviricetes
- Order: Elliovirales
- Family: Hantaviridae
- Genus: Orthohantavirus
- Species: Orthohantavirus bayoui
- Virus: Catacamas virus

Type of virus

Catacamas virus is a single-stranded, enveloped novel RNA virus in the genus Orthohantavirus of the family Hantaviridae isolated in Oryzomys couesi near the town of Catacamas in eastern Honduras. It is a member virus of the species Orthohantavirus bayoui.

== Natural reservoir ==
Catacamas virus was isolated from Oryzomys couesi and none of 41 other rodents that were also trapped near the town of Catacamas. The finding represents the first time a hantavirus species has been found in Honduras.

== Virology ==
Analysis of nucleotide and amino acid sequence data indicated that this hantaviral strain is phylogenetically most closely related to Bayou virus which is associated with the marsh rice rat (Oryzomys palustris) in the southeastern United States.

== See also ==
- Playa de Oro virus
