= Muleshoe virus =

Virus classification
- (unranked): Virus
- Realm: Riboviria
- Kingdom: Orthornavirae
- Phylum: Negarnaviricota
- Class: Bunyaviricetes
- Order: Elliovirales
- Family: Hantaviridae
- Genus: Orthohantavirus
- Virus: Muleshoe virus

Species of virus

Muleshoe virus (MULEV) is a novel, single-stranded, enveloped, negative-sense RNA orthohantavirus.

== Natural reservoir ==
Muleshoe virus was isolated from two cotton rats (Sigmodon hispidus) in Deaf Smith County, Texas in 1995 following a fatal case of hantavirus pulmonary syndrome in a child. The field investigation yielded the novel Muleshoe virus. The source of HPS in the child was determined to be Sin Nombre virus.

== Virology ==
The complete genomic sequence was determined for MULEV and found to be phylogenetically closest in structure to Bayou virus.

== See also ==
- Hantavirus pulmonary syndrome
- Hantavirus hemorrhagic fever with renal syndrome
- 1993 Four Corners hantavirus outbreak
