= Muroid molar =

Type of tooth in rodents

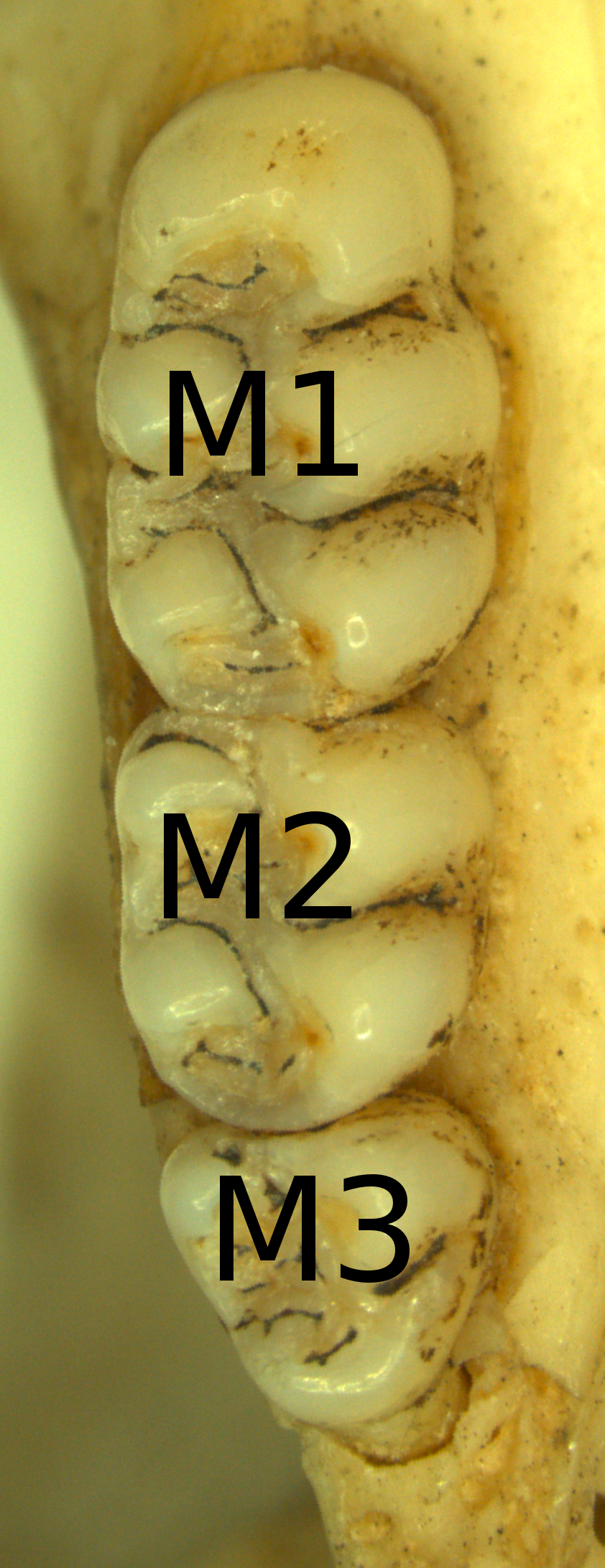
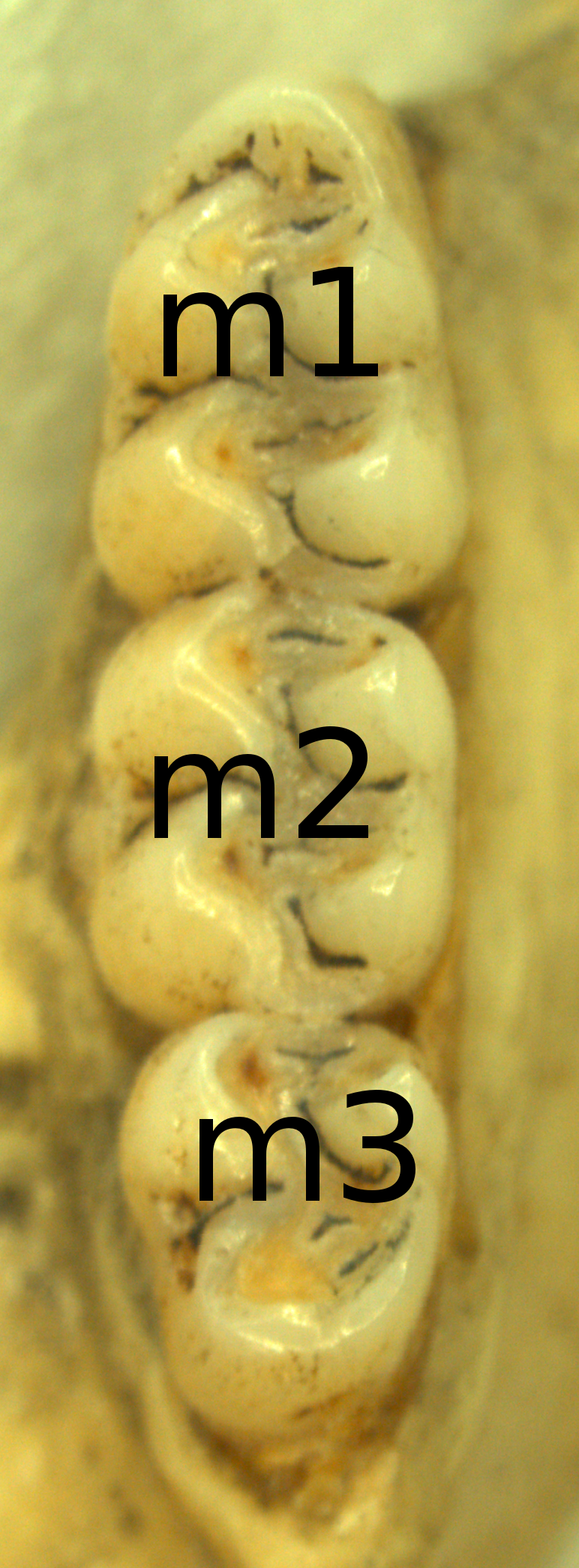
Upper (left) and lower (right) molar row of Megalomys desmarestii, showing commonly used nomenclature for the molars.

Rodents of the superfamily Muroidea, which includes mice, rats, voles, hamsters, bamboo rats, and many other species, generally have three molars in each quadrant of the jaws. A few of the oldest species retain the fourth upper premolar, and some living species have lost the third and even the second molars. Features of the molar crown are often used in muroid taxonomy, and many different systems have been proposed to name these features.

== Description ==
Muroids are most closely related to the Dipodidae, a smaller group of rodents that includes the jerboas and birch mice. Jerboas have a dental formula of 1.0.0–1.31.0.0.3 × 2 = 16–18, including incisors in the upper and lower jaws, three molars in the upper and lower jaw, and in most species a small premolar (the fourth upper premolar, P4) in the upper jaw only. In contrast, all muroids lack the P4, but some species of Pappocricetodon from the Eocene of Asia, one of the earliest known muroids, do have a P4. Some have suggested that the first molar in muroids is in fact a retained deciduous premolar, but this hypothesis has been discredited. Several species have lost the M3 and/or m3, and four species of the New Guinea murine genus Pseudohydromys have also lost the M2 and m2, so that they only have four minute molars.

== Nomenclature ==
In 1977, Reig noted that eleven distinct nomenclatures had been proposed for the features of "cricetid" (generalized muroid) molars, by Schaub, Viret, Winge, Wood and Wilson, Hershkovitz, James, Vandebroek, Fahlbusch, Alker, Vorontzov, and Mein and Freudenthal. He concluded that none of these were satisfactory and proceeded to propose another, "unifying" nomenclature. Additional nomenclatures have been proposed for the Murinae and for other, smaller groups.

== Ontogeny ==
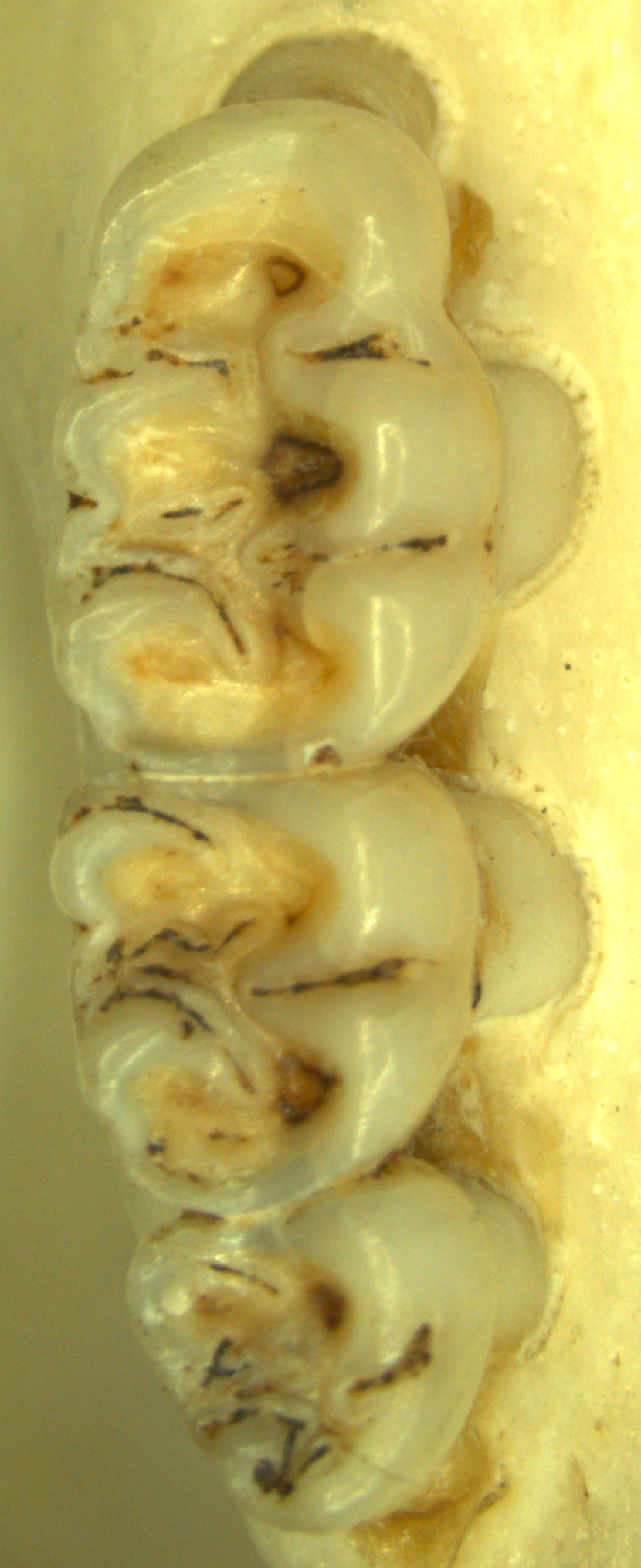
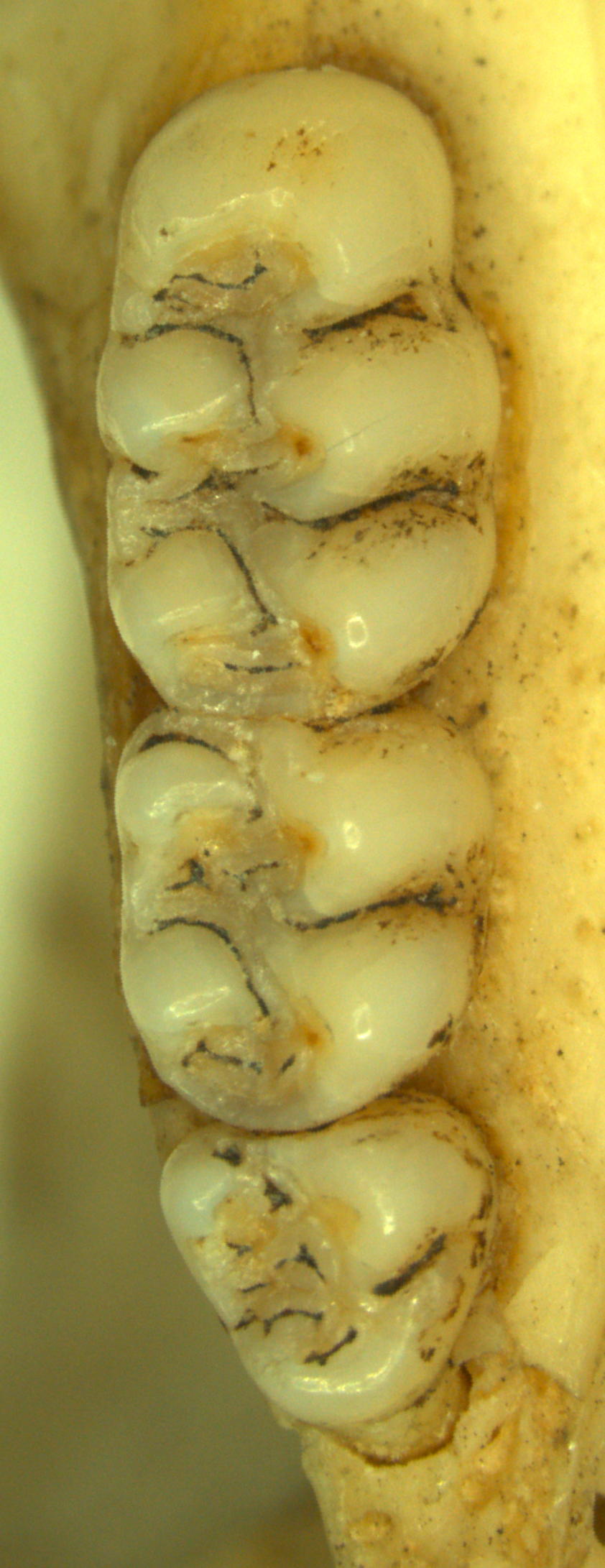
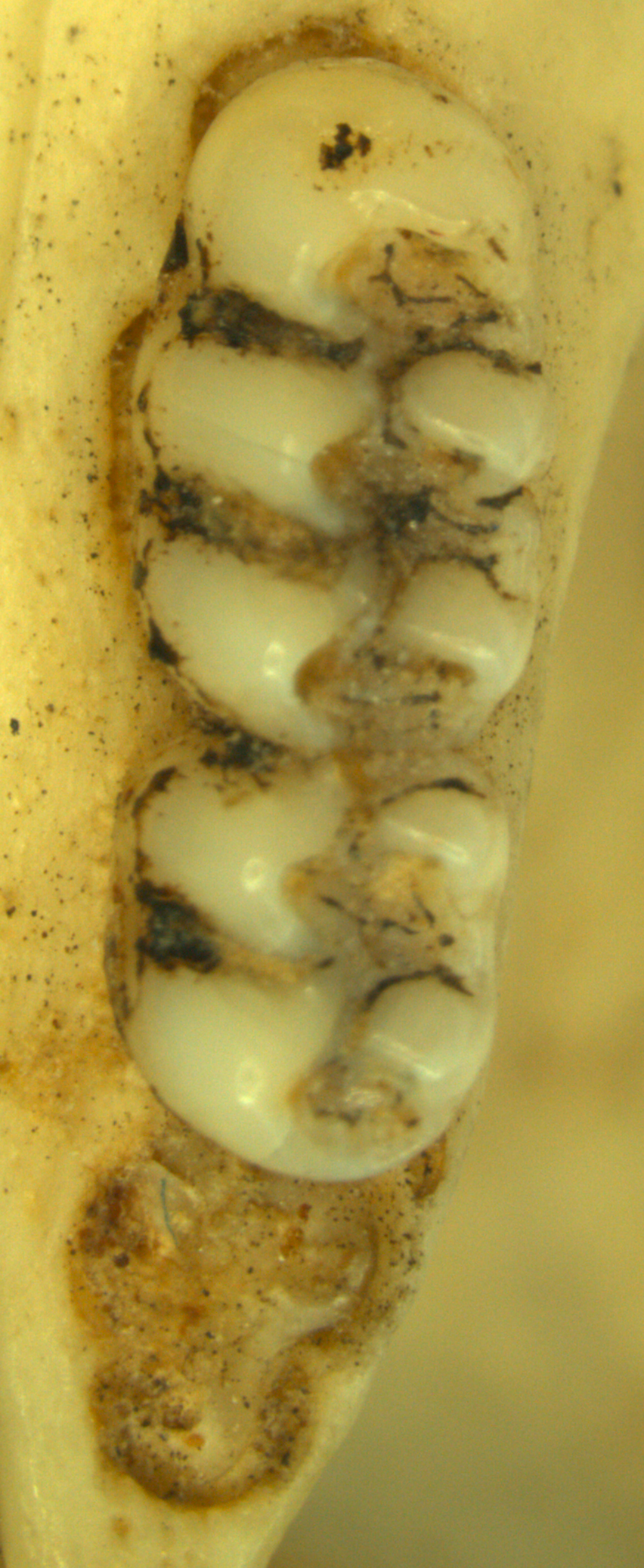
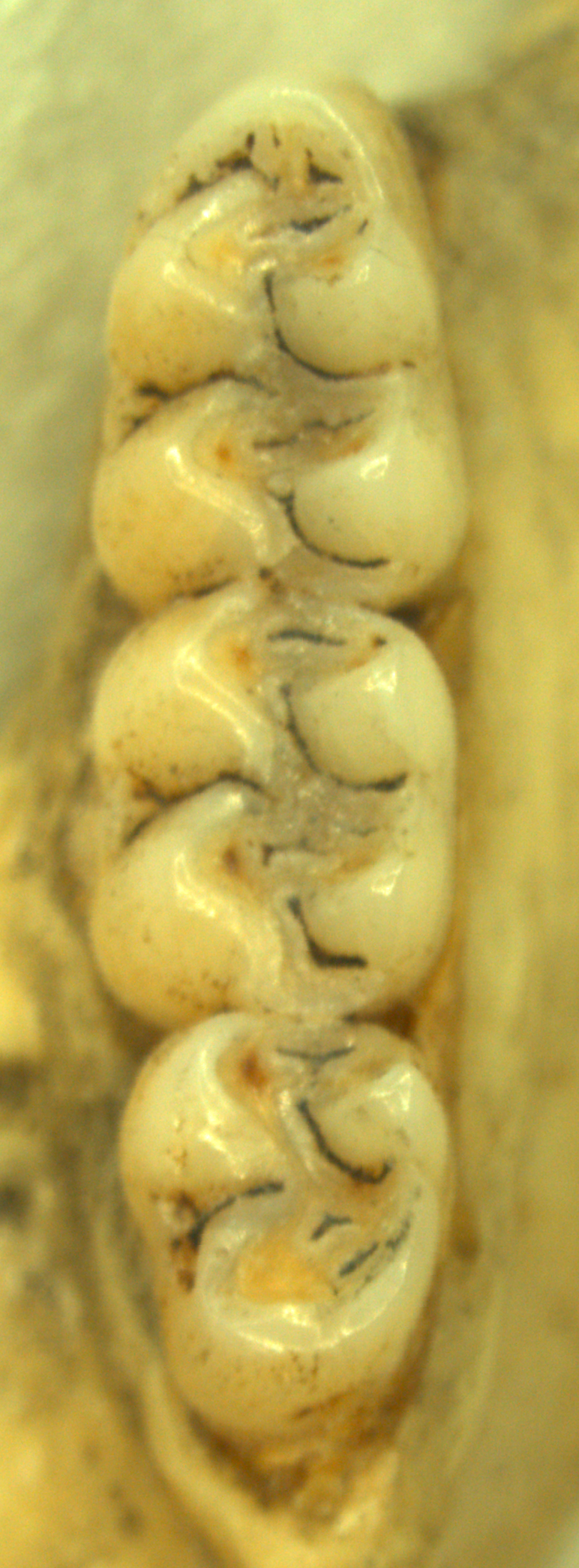
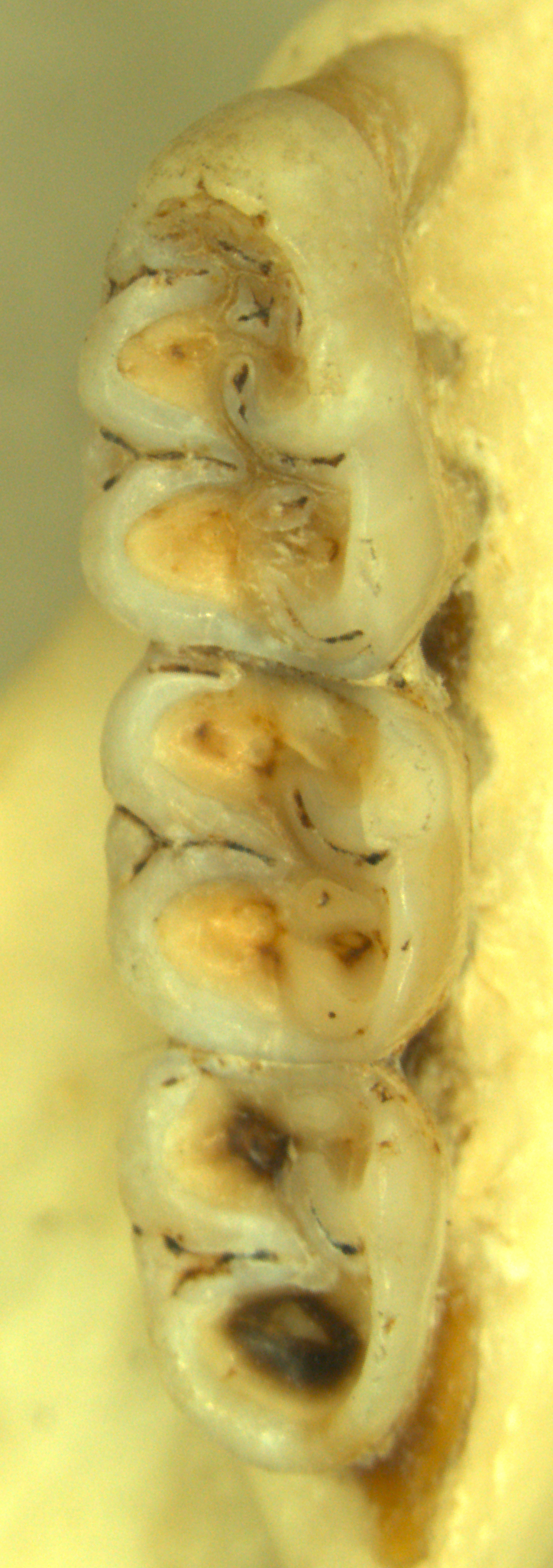
Ontogeny of the molars in Megalomys desmarestii. From left to right: Left upper molar row of an older animal, left upper molar row of a younger animal, right upper molar row of the same young animal with the M3 not yet erupted, left lower molar row of the older animal, left lower molar row of the younger animal.

Muroids are often considered adult when the third molar has erupted. After the molars erupt, wear progressively obliterates the distinct features of the molar crown.

== Literature cited ==
- Carleton, M.D. and Musser, G.G. 1984. Muroid rodents. Pp. 289–379 in Anderson. S. and Jones, J.K. Jr. (eds.). Orders and families of Recent mammals of the world. John Wiley and Sons, New York, 686 pp.
- Carleton, M.D. and Musser, G.G. 2005. Order Rodentia. Pp. 745–752 in Wilson, D.E. and Reeder, D.M. (eds.). Mammal Species of the World: a taxonomic and geographic reference. 3rd ed. Baltimore: The Johns Hopkins University Press, 2 vols., 2142 pp. ISBN 978-0-8018-8221-0
- Ellerman, J.R. 1940. The families and genera of living rodents. Volume I. Rodents other than Muridae. London: Printed by order of the Trustees of the British Museum, 689 pp.
- Emry, R.J. 2007. The middle Eocene North American myomorph rodent Elymys, her Asian sister Aksyiromys, and other Eocene myomorphs (subscription required). Bulletin of Carnegie Museum of Natural History 39:141–150.
- Helgen, K.M. and Helgen, L.E. 2009. Biodiversity and biogeography of the moss-mice of New Guinea: a taxonomic revision of Pseudohydromys (Muridae: Murinae). Bulletin of the American Museum of Natural History 331:230–313.
- Musser, G.G. and Newcomb, C. 1983. Malaysian murids and the giant rat of Sumatra. Bulletin of the American Museum of Natural History 174:327-598.
- Reig, O.A. 1977. A proposed unified nomenclature for the enamelled components of the molar teeth of the Cricetidae (Rodentia) (subscription only). Journal of Zoology, London 181:227–241.
- Voss, R.S. 1991. An introduction to the neotropical muroid rodent genus Zygodontomys. Bulletin of the American Museum of Natural History 210:1–113.
- Zijlstra, J.S., Hoek Ostende, L.W. van den and Due, R.A. 2008. Verhoeven's giant rat of Flores (Papagomys theodorverhoeveni, Muridae) extinct after all? Contributions to Zoology 77(1):25–31.
