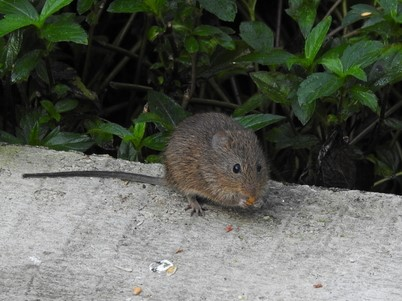

Conservation status
- Least Concern (IUCN 3.1)

Scientific classification
- Kingdom: Animalia
- Phylum: Chordata
- Class: Mammalia
- Order: Rodentia
- Family: Cricetidae
- Subfamily: Sigmodontinae
- Genus: Sigmodon
- Species: S. mascotensis

Binomial name
- Sigmodon mascotensis J. A. Allen, 1897

= Jaliscan cotton rat =

Species of rodent

The Jaliscan cotton rat or Mexican cotton rat (Sigmodon mascotensis) is a species of rodent in the family Cricetidae. It is found only in Mexico. They commonly have brown fur with white fur on the belly. They are ground-dwelling and prefer open habitats.

== Distribution and habitat ==
The Mexican cotton rat is endemic to Mexico and is distributed along the western coast of the country. This area is located in the tropical deciduous forest biome, and the Mexican cotton rat prefers to reside in the open, grassy areas with dense areas of ground-level vegetation and little to no trees. However, these rats will occupy a variety of habitats when their populations grow in size. The Mexican cotton rat coexists cooperatively with other similar rodents in the ecosystem.

== Phylogeny ==
The Mexican cotton rat belongs to the family Cricetidae in the order Rodentia. While it used to be considered a subspecies of Sigmodon hispidus (Hispid cotton rat), the Mexican cotton rat was designated as its own species after an ancestral karyotype study. The Mexican cotton rat and the Hispid cotton rat can be distinguished chromosomally as well as by different skull characteristics.

== Hantavirus ==
Hantavirus is spread to humans through exposure to rodent fecal matter or by rodent bites and can become fatal. Different species of rodents can carry different strains of hantavirus. The Mexican cotton rat has been found to be one of the more prevalent carriers of hantavirus due its high amount of hantaviral antibodies. The hantavirus that the Mexican cotton rat carries is a unique genotype of this virus, which is also carried by Oryzomys couesi (Coues's rice rat).
