= Bayou virus =

Virus classification
- (unranked): Virus
- Realm: Riboviria
- Kingdom: Orthornavirae
- Phylum: Negarnaviricota
- Class: Bunyaviricetes
- Order: Elliovirales
- Family: Hantaviridae
- Genus: Orthohantavirus
- Species: Orthohantavirus bayoui
- Virus: Bayou virus

Member viruses
- Bayou virus Louisiana; Catacamas virus

Synonyms
- Bayou hantavirus; Bayou orthohantavirus

Species of virus

Bayou virus (BAYV) is a species of Orthohantavirus comprising enveloped and spherical viruses. It was first identified in 1993 in Louisiana and later confirmed by other investigators. BAYV was recognized as a distinct form of hantavirus disease, now known as hantavirus pulmonary syndrome (HPS). It now represents the second most common hantavirus in the United States behind the Sin Nombre virus. In 1996, the marsh rice rat, which is seen in marshes in the southeast and mountain streams in the northeast, was identified as the natural reservoir of the virus. Although the virus was first identified in Louisiana, it is widespread throughout the Southeastern United States. This hantavirus disease is known as a severe and sometimes fatal respiratory disease, and HPS has a case-rate fatality of almost 50%.

== Discovery and identification ==
=== Early investigations ===
The initial identification of BAYV arose from surveillance of unexplained cases of hantavirus pulmonary syndrome (HPS) in Louisiana. Initial investigations of BAYV were conducted on lung tissue samples from infected individuals, where hantavirus-specific RNA sequences and antibodies were detected through serological techniques. In order to detect HPS antibodies, scientists used a μ-capture enzyme-linked immunosorbent assay (ELISA) and immunoglobulin (Ig) G ELISA with a Sin Nombre virus (SN) nucleocapsid protein as the antigen target. Other significant assays were completed with recombinant-expressed viral N antigens, which were conducted using immunoblot and Western Blot formats and completed as confirmatory tests. The immunoblot assay included five membrane-bound antigens, including SN virus N and G1, recombinant-expressed Seoul virus N, and synthetic peptides of SN N and G1.

=== Rodent collection and processing ===
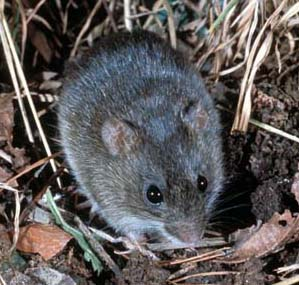
Oryzomys palustris (Marsh rice rat) in vegetation

In addition to cases in the Southeastern United States, two BAY virus-HPS cases were seen in Texas in Jefferson County. This study included rodent samples collected using Sherman live traps and used to collect marsh rice rats from Jefferson County and the neighboring Orange County. Heart blood samples from the mice were taken and screened by a recombinant SN virus N antigen ELISA. In addition to the heart blood samples, rodent lung, kidney, and spleen samples were used to make RNA using a standard set of partially nested primers in the viral S segment to complete reverse transcription-polymerase chain reaction (RT-PCR) to analyze the RNA sequence. The PCR products were then used to complete phylogenetic trees from the informative sequences using PAUP 3.1 software.

=== CDC's role and field studies ===
Following the initial discovery of BAYV in 1993, a large field study was conducted in the Southeastern marshes in the United States, leading to the identification of BAYV in marsh rice rat populations. These results from their field study confirmed an established unique pattern of BAYV confined mainly to the southeastern U.S., which contrasts with Sin Nombre virus, as it is more widespread in the southwestern U.S.

In 1993 the CDC conducted studies on Sin Nombre virus, which caused 11 cases of HPS in Arizona and 18 cases in New Mexico, along with 1-5 cases spread across 12 other states in the western U.S. Through their field studies they found that from western HPS cases in May 1993 to December 1993 cases ranged from ages 12 to 69 years old, with a mean age of 31. They found 23 out of 53 (43%) of individuals infected were female, while 30 out of 53 (57%) were male. Approximately 49% of cases were seen in American Indians, 42% in non-Hispanic whites, 8% in Hispanics, and 2% in non-Hispanic blacks. At the time of the Sin Nombre study, they had not yet identified BAYV as a hantavirus.

The eventual identification of BAYV as a distinct hantavirus species with a different region of infection emphasized the need for the CDC to increase geographically tailored surveillance programs across all areas in the U.S.

=== Historical cases and geographic expansion ===
Although BAYV was discovered in Louisiana in 1993, retrospective analyses and seroprevalence surveys suggest that HPS cases could be potentially linked to BAYV and may have occurred as early as the 1980s. Though HPS in the U.S. can be attributed to three different hantaviruses (Sin Nombre virus, Seoul virus, and BAYV), the cases linked to the southeastern U.S. indicate a link to BAYV. The analysis of the first 100 U.S. cases identified showed that the disease was distributed in 21 states and had gone unrecognized since at least 1959. HPS outbreaks were seen between 1950-1953 during the Korean War, as more than 3,000 United Nations soldiers fell ill with Korean hemorrhagic fever, a hantavirus disease that sees hundreds of cases per year. The first HPS case in the United States occurred in 1993 in New Mexico, where 33% of cases would be identified. The source of HPS was confirmed when the hantavirus associated with HPS was isolated from a deer mouse in the home of someone confirmed to have HPS. Following virus isolation and PCR conducted on both the lung material from the mice and Vero E6 cell cultures were obtained, and the PCR sequences were found to be identical, confirming the identity of the hantavirus. Historical case studies provide insights into how BAYV may have spread from Louisiana to other southeastern states, mirroring the distribution patterns of marsh rice rats across different wetland habitats.

== Transmission and reservoir ecology ==
=== Transmission mechanisms ===
BAYV transmission occurs primarily through aerosolized particles from infected rodents' bodily fluids, particularly urine, feces, and saliva. Humans mostly become infected when they breathe in these particles, especially in enclosed spaces where the virus can become concentrated. This means an individual could come into contact with hantavirus through breathing in hantavirus-contaminated air when cleaning up after rodents, touching contaminated objects to the nose or mouth, being bitten or scratched by infected rodents, or eating hantavirus-contaminated food. Other significant risk factors include living near wetland areas, engaging in agricultural activities, and performing tasks that disturb rodent habitats. The Andes virus, a hantavirus found in South America, has even been found to spread through person-to-person transmission, raising concern about hantavirus evolution in the U.S. A hantavirus infection does not always mean HPS will arise, but the majority of hantaviruses in North, Central, and South America cause HPS.

=== Reservoir host: The marsh rice rat ===
The marsh rice rat, a semi-aquatic rodent, is the primary reservoir for BAYV. High levels of BAYV antibodies in marsh rice rat populations highlight the virus's endemic presence in these animals, which can carry BAYV asymptomatically throughout their lifespans. However, in the HPS cases in the southwestern U.S., the primary reservoir was deer mice, another semiaquatic rodent found in grasslands. Still, it can also be found in dry areas like deserts or alpine habitats. Adapted to wetland environments, these marsh rice rats are prevalent in marshes, swamps, and coastal wetlands in the southeastern U.S. Aside from wetlands, they can also be found in rural areas in streams, crops, or even dark, moist areas of homes, which is one of the leading causes of human interaction with the hantavirus. Because they are nocturnal and typically burrow and build nests in grassy vegetation, dark and shaded areas next to homes or agricultural crops can become an ideal location for marsh rice rats.

=== Ecological impacts and habitat requirements ===
The ecology of marsh rice rats and their habitats plays a crucial role in BAYV transmission. As semi-aquatic rodents, these rats thrive in moist, vegetated areas, often near human populations that have encroached on wetland habitats. As mentioned above, these rodents are also nocturnal, so they require a burrowing or overgrown habitat where they can rest undisturbed during the majority of the day. One of the biggest threats to the marsh rice rat is habitat loss, as more and more wetlands are overtaken by development, causing a strain on the marsh rice rat population. Because of this requirement, they can find themselves in tall wetlands, where they are both protected and undisturbed. Seasonal changes, especially flooding and temperature shifts, affect rat population density and, consequently, BAYV transmission rates. The rise in temperature shifts and breeding schedule results in the highest numbers, and BAYV transmission rates occur in the summer months. Marsh rice rats breed many times from March to October, with a gestation period of about 25 days, usually resulting in a litter of 3-5 young. Due to the breeding and gestation time, the population peaks during the summer.

=== Role of other species in transmission dynamics ===
While marsh rice rats are the primary host, rodent species like deer mice may occasionally harbor BAYV. However, they do not maintain the virus's lifecycle like other hantaviruses. Due to the diversity within wetland ecosystems, ecological studies have explored whether predators like snakes and raptors that feed on marsh rice rats might influence BAYV spread through prey population dynamics. Through these studies, they have found that snakes, birds, and pets cannot carry or be infected by a hantavirus.

== Molecular biology and genomic insights ==
=== Genomic structure of BAYV ===
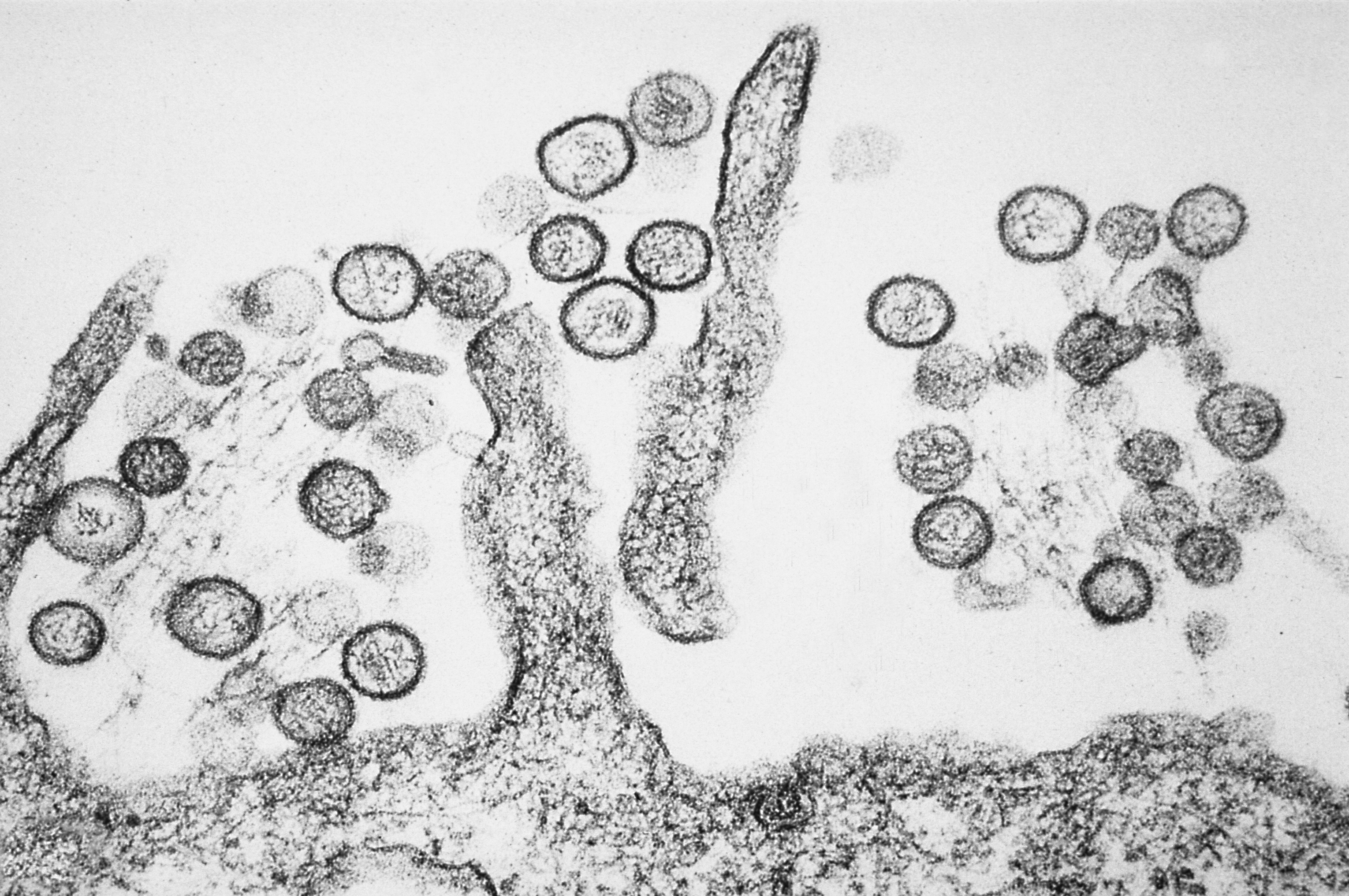
Transmission electron micrograph of Sin Nombre virus

BAYV's RNA genome consists of three segments: S (small), M (medium), and L (large). The small segment. (S) of the RNA genome encodes the nucleocapsid proteins (N), which is the most abundant viral protein following infection as the nucleocapsid plays an essential role in intracellular transportation, viral assembly, viral attachment to host cell proteins, and regulating the interferon response in infected cells by inhibiting the IFN-beta promoter. The medium genome segment (M) encodes for the glycoproteins (Gn and Gc), which are involved in binding to the target cell receptor and viral entry and can help modulate immune responses. The large genome segment (L) encodes for an RNA-dependent RNA polymerase, which is essential in carrying out replication and transcription of the genome. Due to each genome segment being critical to the virus's survival and pathogenicity, mutations in any segment could influence its pathogenicity, host specificity, and survival in general.

=== Mechanisms of viral replication and cell entry ===
Orthohantaviruses targets endothelial cells, primarily within rodent lung tissue, by binding to cellular receptors through its glycoproteins (Gn and Gc). This interaction begins with the surface glycoproteins Gn and Gc, with target endothelial cells or macrophages with Beta-3 integrin on their surface. This binding initiates endocytosis, enabling the virus to replicate within the host cell, and eventually activates the host immune response. This immune response, especially by macrophages and CD8 T cells, may be involved in the pathogenesis that leads to respiratory failure, as the virus will cause the host cell to secrete a wide array of inflammatory cytokines. Activated macrophages secrete proinflammatory cytokines such as TNF-α, interleukin-1 (IL-1), and IL-6. The excess of these cytokines produced by macrophages and activated hantavirus-specific T cells upon antigen recognition on infected pulmonary endothelial cells is probably critical for HPS pathogenesis.

=== Evolution and genetic variability ===
Genetic analyses of BAYV and hantavirus samples from different geographic regions, like the southeast or southwestern U.S., show some variability, indicating regional adaptation. This regional adaptation of the virus may be based on its reservoir (marsh rice rat vs. deer mice) and the habitats it can withstand, as marsh rice rats reside in warmer, more moist climates, and deer mice can reside in cooler, drier habitats as well. These adaptations may result from selective pressures within distinct marsh rice rat populations or deer mice populations throughout the changing seasons. Evolutionary studies suggest that BAYV diverged from other hantaviruses millions of years ago, adapting to its rodent host through gradual mutations. The difficulty in isolation of hantaviruses from rodents or humans, coupled with the required safety measures associated when working with biosafety level 3 or 4 (BSL-3, BSL-4), can make it hard to conduct several in-depth studies on BAYV's evolution and genetic variability.

== Pathogenesis and immunological response ==
=== Mechanisms of host cell damage ===
Upon infection, BAYV primarily damages the endothelium via the interaction of the Gc and Gn glycoprotein with the host cell's surface cell receptors. This interaction can lead to endocytosis in specific host cells, allowing the hantavirus to overtake the target cell and complete viral replication. BAYV's ability to damage the endothelium in the lungs leads to increased blood vessel permeability, resulting in fluid leakage into the lungs. This causes the hallmark symptoms of HPS, including shortness of breath, coughing, and chest tightness as the liquid builds up in the lungs. The virus may also affect the heart and kidneys via further endothelial disruption in blood vessels, leading to systemic complications in severe cases.

=== Cytokine response and immune evasion ===
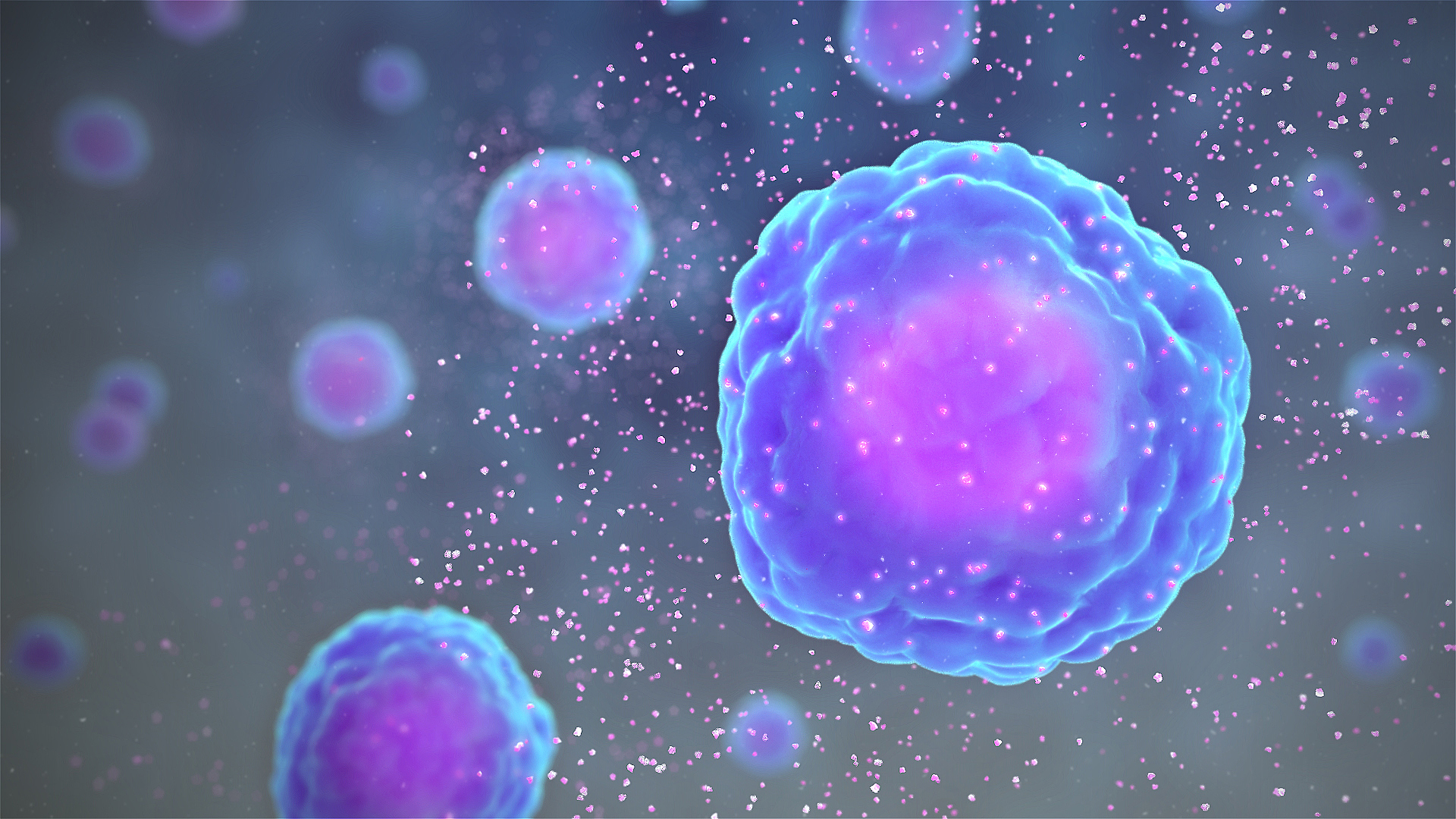
3D animation of cytokine secretion

BAYV infection triggers a robust immune response characterized by cytokine release, often associated with severe proinflammatory responses. The immune response by macrophages and other CD8 T cells will secrete proinflammatory cytokines, including tumor necrosis factor-alpha (TNF-α), interleukin-1 (IL-1), and IL-6. CD4 T cells, after antigen recognition, differentiate into at least two types of helper T cells, including T helper 1 (Th1) and Th2 cells. Th1 cells produce gamma interferon (IFN-γ) and TNF-β (or lymphotoxin-α), responsible for cell-mediated immunity, and IL-12 regulates this differentiation. Th2 cells produce IL-4 and IL-5 and promote humoral and allergic responses. Pro- and anti-inflammatory Th1 and Th2 cytokines associated with 21 HPS patients infected showed very high levels of IL-6 for fatal HPS cases. The associated IL-6 levels were correlated negatively with arterial blood pressure in patients, suggesting that IL-6 has a vital role in inhibiting cardiac function and inducing hypotension in HPS, emphasizing IL-6 potential role in hallmark HPS symptoms of chest tightness and damage to the heart via disruption of endothelial cells in blood vessels. This "cytokine storm" from CD8 and C4 T cells and other B cells exacerbates lung tissue damage and leads to respiratory distress. BAYV is able to employ these immune evasion strategies, like down-regulating immunosuppressive signaling pathways, allowing it to persist in the host and contribute to the severity of symptoms and pathogenicity.

== Symptoms and clinical presentation ==
=== Initial symptoms or prodromal phase ===
BAYV and other hantavirus infections begin in the first few days and have general symptoms, including fever, fatigue, headache, chills, and dizziness. Gastrointestinal symptoms, such as nausea, vomiting, diarrhea, and abdominal pain, are also seen during the initial stages. The non-specific symptoms make early diagnosis of the virus difficult.

=== Progression to the cardiopulmonary phase ===
Within 4-10 days of infection, patients may begin to experience severe respiratory symptoms as the infection progresses. These symptoms can include cough, shortness of breath, tightness of the chest, and rapid onset of pulmonary edema. Fluid buildup in the lungs caused by vascular leakage via viral disruption of endothelial blood vessel cells can lead to respiratory failure if untreated.

=== Multi-organ involvement and complications ===
In addition to lung involvement, BAYV infection can affect the heart, kidneys, and liver, leading to complications such as acute kidney injury and systemic inflammatory response syndrome (SIRS). This is due to the Hantavirus' ability to infect a range of endothelial cells. Studies have shown that, in rare cases, BAYV may contribute to myocarditis, an inflammation of the heart muscle, through the "cytokine storm" they induce. SIRS or myocarditis further complicates treatment and recovery and can lead to an even higher case fatality.

=== Case studies and clinical observations ===
Several well-documented cases of BAYV infection offer insights into its clinical progression. Studies like the CDC's of the 1993 Hantavirus outbreak in the western U.S. have contributed vastly to today's knowledge of the virus's epidemiology, viral mechanisms, and potentially more efficient treatments. Reviewing these case studies, clinicians have observed varying incubation periods, symptom severity, and outcomes, suggesting potential factors influencing disease course, including age, pre-existing conditions, and genetic predisposition.

== Diagnosis ==
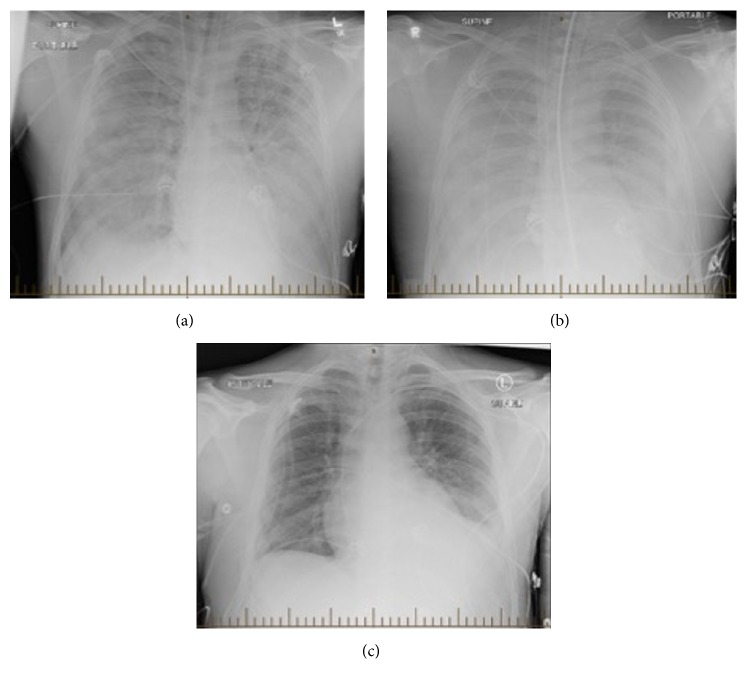
Radiographic progression of hantavirus pulmonary syndrome in patient.

Molecular Diagnostic Techniques

Diagnosis primarily relies on molecular methods, such as reverse transcription-polymerase chain reaction (RT-PCR), which can detect hantavirus RNA in blood or tissue samples. Molecular diagnostics are essential due to BAYV's genetic similarity to other hantaviruses, which makes serological distinction challenging. Additionally, the early symptoms of HPS are non-specific and general, making the genetic diagnostic techniques even more critical.

=== Serological testing and emerging technologies ===
Serological assays to detect hantavirus antibodies are commonly used but have limitations in distinguishing BAYV from related Sin Nombre virus or other hantaviruses. Emerging technologies, such as CRISPR-based diagnostics, promise to improve specificity in distinguishing between hantavirus strains, potentially enabling faster and more accurate diagnosis. The faster, more precise diagnostic could significantly impact treatment as the severity of HPS symptoms increases very quickly.

=== Challenges in differential diagnosis ===
BAYV's non-specific early symptoms can be misdiagnosed as influenza, COVID-19, or bacterial pneumonia. Differential diagnosis often requires detailed patient history, including recent exposure to rodent habitats, which the patient may not be aware of. Point-of-care and other quick molecular diagnostic tests for hantavirus are under development, which could improve rapid diagnosis in rural areas, typically where most hantavirus cases are found.

== Treatment and management ==
=== Current supportive treatment protocols ===
There is currently a hantavirus vaccine that protects humans against hantavirus infections. The first vaccine was developed in 1990, and was initially used to fight the Hantaan River virus, which causes one of the most severe forms of Hantavirus Hemorrhagic fever with renal syndrome (HFRS). The vaccine, with the market name of Hantavax, has also been used for other hantaviruses like Seoul virus. However, it has not been seen effective for BAYV at this time. In severe cases, supportive care, including oxygen therapy, fluid management, and mechanical ventilation, is at the forefront of the BAYV treatment. Close monitoring of respiratory function and kidney parameters is critical, as BAYV can lead to multi-organ failure.

=== Experimental therapies and clinical trials ===
Research into antiviral agents, including ribavirin and favipiravir, has shown mixed results, and efficacy in BAYV cases remains under investigation. Ribavirin and favipiravir were thought to provide efficacious treatments as they are both used to treat proinflammatory viruses, including Hepatitis C and SARS-Cov-2, where they have been found to induce antiviral therapies. Immunomodulatory treatments, such as corticosteroids, may help reduce inflammation, although their benefits for HPS are still unclear.

=== Investigating monoclonal antibody therapies ===
Recent advancements in monoclonal antibody therapies have led to the exploration of these treatments for BAYV. By targeting specific viral proteins, like the glycoproteins (Gn or Gc), these antibodies could potentially neutralize the virus, limiting its spread and reducing its severity. Further clinical trials are needed to evaluate these therapies' safety and efficacy for hantavirus infections.

== Prevention and control ==
=== Personal preventative measures ===
Preventing BAYV infection involves reducing rodent exposure and implementing hygiene measures in affected areas. As mentioned previously, major risk factors include living near wetland areas, engaging in agricultural activities, and performing tasks that disturb rodent habitats. Trying to limit these significant risk factors will provide the preventative measures needed. If these risk factors are unavoidable, guidelines include wearing protective masks and gloves when cleaning areas where rodents may have been and sealing homes to prevent rodent entry.
