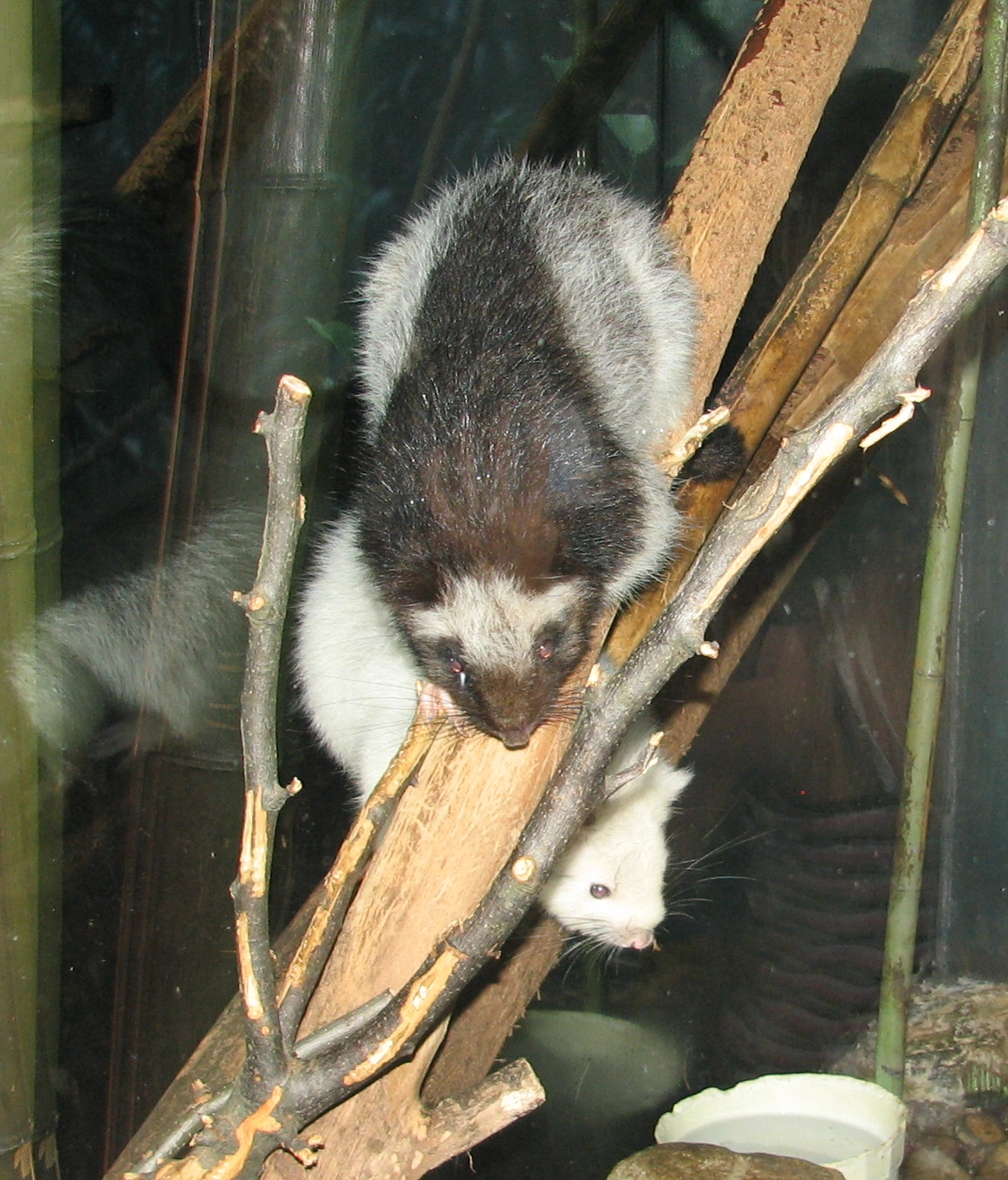
- Northern Luzon slender-tailed cloud rat (Phloeomys pallidus) at the Cincinnati Zoo

Scientific classification
- Kingdom: Animalia
- Phylum: Chordata
- Class: Mammalia
- Infraclass: Placentalia
- Order: Rodentia
- Family: Muridae
- Subfamily: Murinae
- Tribe: Phloeomyini; Alston, 1876

Genera
- Batomys Thomas, 1895; Carpomys Thomas, 1895; Crateromys Thomas, 1895; Musseromys Heaney et al., 2009; Phloeomys (Waterhouse, 1839)

Diversity
- 21 species

= Cloud rat =

Cloud rats Temporal range: Middle pleistocene - Recent

Tribe of mammals

The cloud rats or cloudrunners are a tribe (Phloeomyini) of arboreal and nocturnal herbivorous rodents endemic to the cloud forests of the Philippines. They belong to the family Muridae and include five genera: Batomys (hairy-tailed rats), Carpomys (dwarf cloud rats), Crateromys (bushy-tailed cloud rats), Musseromys (Luzon tree mice), and Phloeomys (giant cloud rats). They range in size from as large as 50 cm (20 in) to as small as 74 mm (2.9 in). Cloud rats are threatened by habitat loss and illegal hunting. Several species are endangered or critically endangered.

== Description ==
Cloud rats are characterized by long furry or hairy tails and short hind limbs with grasping feet. They spend most of their time in the canopy of cloud forests, hence the name "cloud rat" or "cloudrunner". They are believed to be entirely herbivorous, primarily eating leaves, buds, bark, fruits, and seeds. Their ecology and behavior are poorly known. Cloud rats belonging to the genera Batomys, Crateromys, and Phloeomys are typically large, with the largest species being Phloeomys pallidus (reaching up to 2.7 kg (6.0 lb) in weight) and Crateromys schadenbergi (reaching up to 1.5 kg (3.3 lb) in weight). They measure from around 20 to 50 cm (7.9 to 19.7 in) in length. Members of the genera Carpomys and Batomys are smaller, with a maximum weight of 165 g (0.364 lb) and 225 g (0.496 lb), respectively. The smallest are members of the recently described genus Musseromys, with a recorded weight of only 15.5 g (0.034 lb) and body lengths of only 74 to 84 mm (2.9 to 3.3 in).

== Conservation ==
Several species of cloud rats are classified as endangered or critically endangered by the IUCN. Cloud rats are primarily threatened with habitat loss and human encroachment due to the extensive deforestation of the Philippines. Larger species of cloud rats (Phloeomys and Crateromys spp.) are also hunted for food, usually by hunter-gatherer tribes in the mountains of the Philippines. In some areas, they are the most commonly hunted species, and hundreds of animals are estimated to be killed annually. Hunting or possession of wildlife is illegal in the Philippines, under Republic Act 9147 (the Wildlife Protection and Conservation Law of 2001), but enforcement still remains problematic.

Several zoos keep and breed cloud rats in captivity; including the London Zoo, Prague Zoo, Central Park Zoo, Bronx Zoo, Wingham Wildlife Park, Chester Zoo, and the Jerusalem Biblical Zoo.

== Taxonomy ==
The cloud rat clade (the "Phloeomys division", sensu Musser & Carleton, 2005), now treated as the tribe Phloeomyini (LeCompte et al., 2008), includes the closely related genera Batomys (hairy-taled rats), Carpomys (dwarf cloud rats), Crateromys (bushy-tailed cloud rats), Musseromys (Luzon tree mice), and Phloeomys (giant cloud rats). They belong to the subfamily Murinae of the family Muridae (rats and mice).

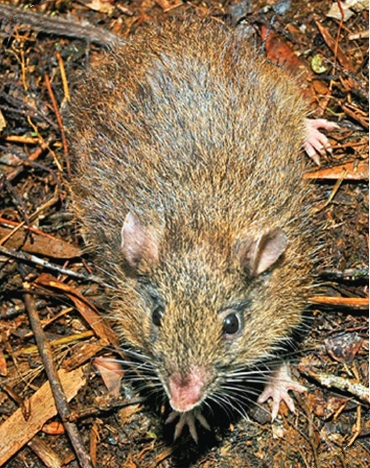
Hamiguitan hairy-tailed rat (Batomys hamiguitan) from Mount Hamiguitan in southeastern Mindanao

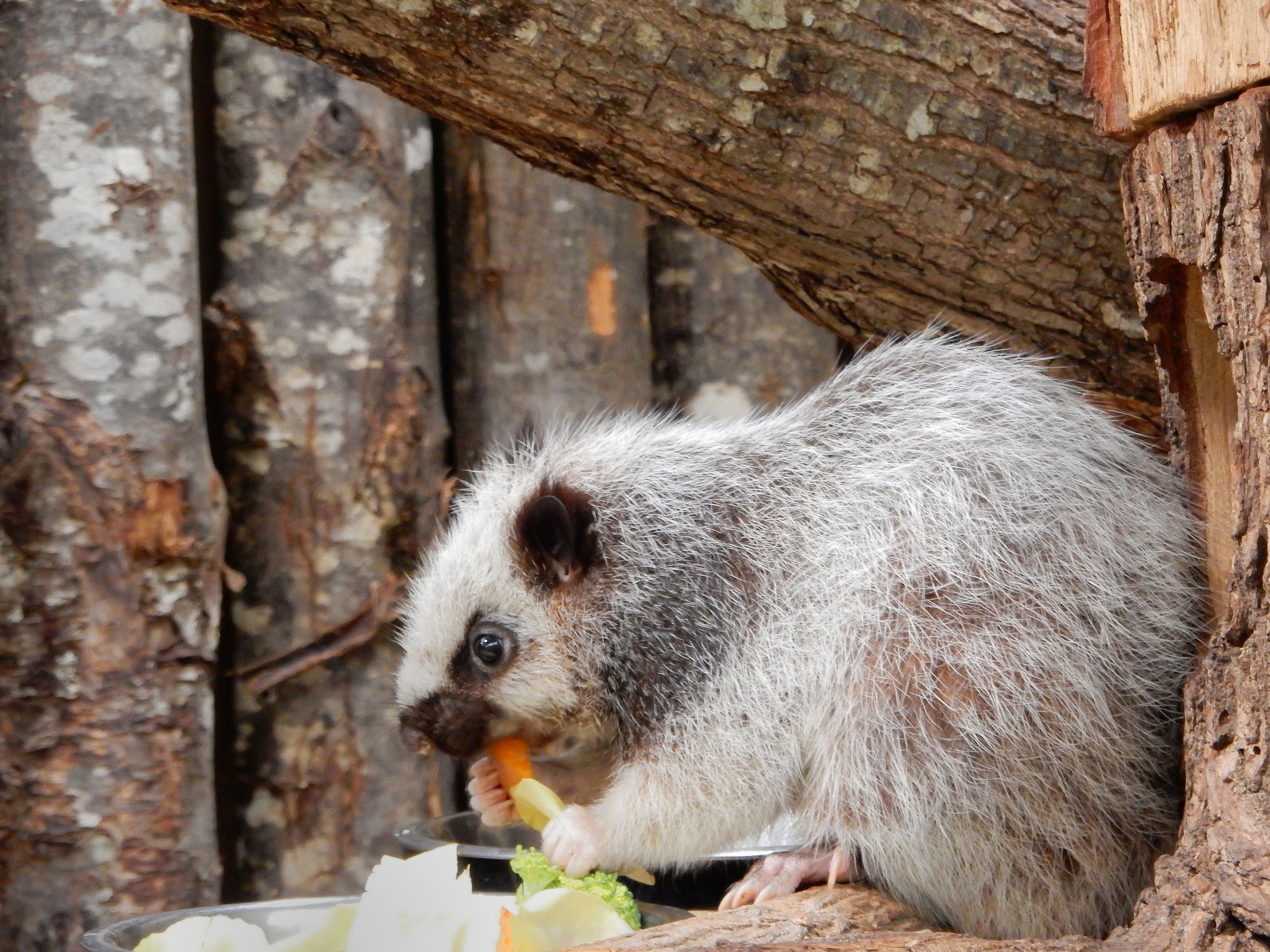
Northern Luzon giant cloud rat (Phloeomys pallidus) in Jardin des plantes in Paris

Note: Extinct species known only from fossils are marked with †

- Tribe Phloeomyini
  - Batomys Thomas, 1895 - Hairy-tailed rats
    - Batomys dentatus Miller, 1911 - Large-toothed hairy-tailed rat
    - Batomys granti Thomas, 1895 - Luzon hairy-tailed rat
    - Batomys hamiguitan Balete, Heaney, Rickart, Quidlat & Ibanez, 2008 - Hamiguitan hairy-tailed rat
    - Batomys russatus Musser, Heaney & Tabaranza Jr., 1998 - Dinagat hairy-tailed rat
    - Batomys salomonseni (Sanborn, 1953) - Mindanao hairy-tailed rat
    - Batomys uragon Balete, Rickart, Heaney & Jansa, 2015
    - †Batomys cagayanensis Ochoa et al, 2021
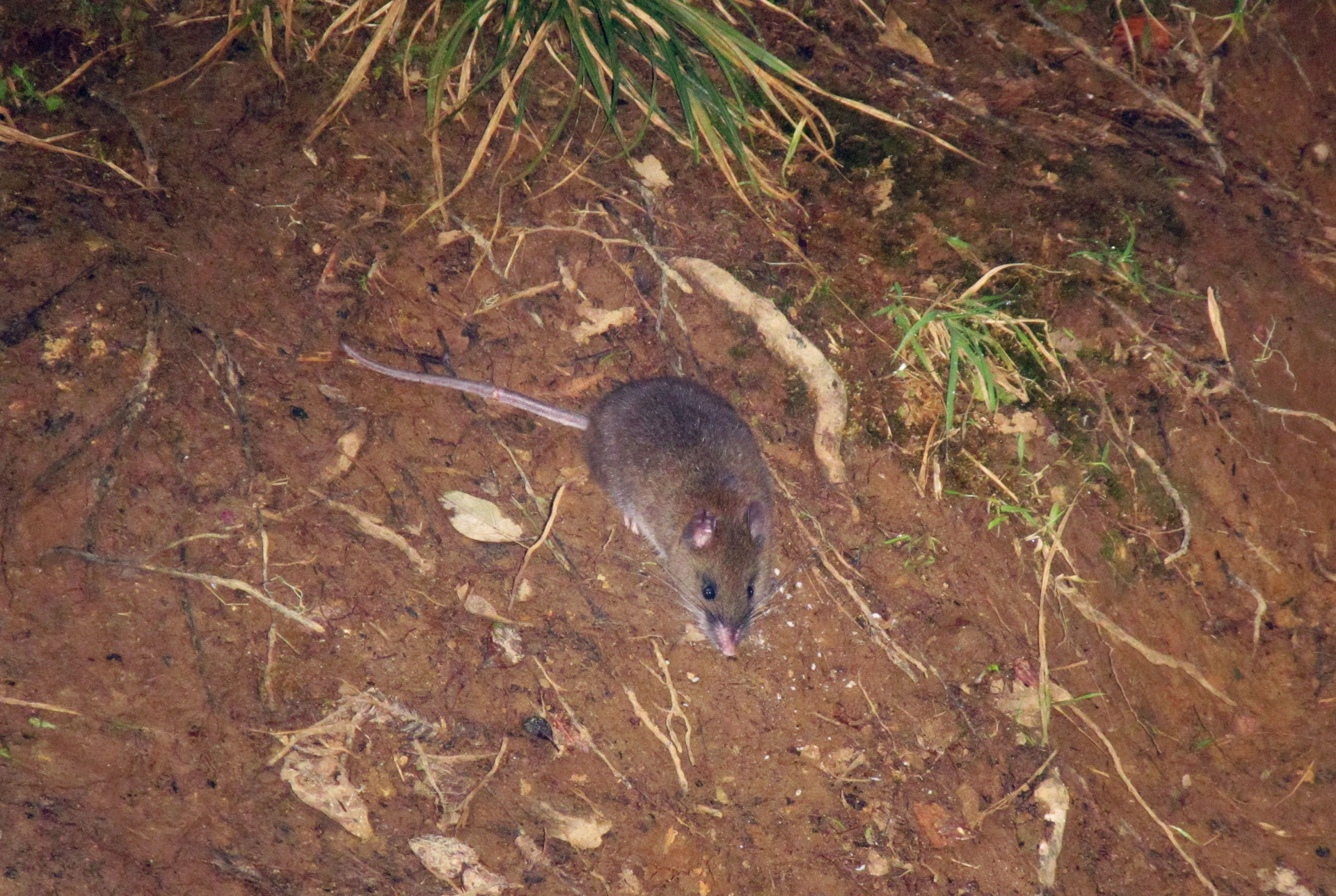
      Short-footed dwarf cloud rat (Carpomys melanurus) from Mt. Pulag in northern Luzon
  - Carpomys Thomas, 1895 - Dwarf cloud rats
    - Carpomys melanurus Thomas, 1895 - Dwarf cloud rat, short-footed Luzon tree rat
    - Carpomys phaeurus Thomas, 1895 - White-bellied Luzon tree rat
    - †Carpomys dakal Thomas, 1895
  - Crateromys Thomas, 1895 - Bushy-tailed cloud rats
    - Crateromys australis Musser, Heaney & Rabor, 1985 - Dinagat Island cloud rat, rediscovered in 2012
    - Crateromys schadenbergi (Meyer, 1895) - Giant bushy-tailed cloud rat
    - Crateromys paulus Musser & Gordon, 1981 - Ilin Island cloud rat, collected in 1981 through a dead specimen
    - Crateromys heaneyi Gonzales & Kennedy, 1996 - Panay bushy-tailed cloud rat
    - †Crateromys ballik Ochoa et al., 2021
  - Musseromys Heaney et al., 2009 - Luzon tree mice
    - Musseromys anacuao Heaney et al., 2014
    - Musseromys beneficus Heaney et al., 2014
    - Musseromys gulantang Heaney et al., 2009 - Banahaw tree mouse
    - Musseromys inopinatus Heaney et al., 2014
  - Phloeomys (Waterhouse, 1839) - Giant cloud rats
    - Phloeomys pallidus Nehring, 1890 - Northern Luzon slender-tailed cloud rat
    - Phloeomys cumingi (Waterhouse, 1839) - Southern Luzon slender-tailed cloud rat

== See also ==
- Apomys (earthworm mice)
- List of threatened species of the Philippines
