= Ungual tuft =

In mammals, ungual tufts are tufts of hairs at the base of claws of the forefeet and hindfeet. Their presence has been used as a character in cladistic studies of the Cricetidae, a large family of rodents.

== Rice rats ==
Members of the tribe Oryzomyini ("rice rats"), in the Cricetidae subfamily Sigmodontinae, normally have ungual tufts, but they may be reduced or absent in semiaquatic species (i.e. those adapted to life in the water). Lundomys molitor, Nectomys apicalis, the marsh rice rat (Oryzomys palustris), and species of Holochilus lack ungual tufts on their forefeet. On the hindfeet, most species have well-developed ungual tufts only on the second to fifth toes, but Sooretamys angouya and Eremoryzomys polius also have thick tufts on the first toe. Pseudoryzomys simplex, Mindomys hammondi, Nectomys squamipes, Sigmodontomys alfari, Oryzomys couesi, the marsh rice rat, and species of Melanomys have sparse ungual tufts only, and Lundomys molitor, Nectomys apicalis, Sigmodontomys aphrastus, and species of Holochilus have very reduced tufts or lack them entirely.

== Other examples ==
Among other South American cricetids, Abrothrix lanosus has white ungual tufts that are shorter than the claws. Akodon paranaensis has long ungual tufts. Calomys cerqueirai has silvery tufts on the second through fifth digits of the forefeet and all digits of the hindfeet. Abrawayaomys has long, dense ungual tufts. The Tylomyinae are characterized by the presence of ungual tufts on their hindfeet.

White ungual tufts are also present in the Philippine murine genus Batomys. B. hamiguitan and B. russatus have short tips, not extending to the tips of the claws, but those of B. granti and B. salomonseni have tufts longer than the claws. The Malagasy Monticolomys has long ungual tufts, extending beyond the claws, whereas the related Macrotarsomys has shorter tufts. The Brazilian spiny rat Phyllomys sulinus has long, light gray ungual tufts.

The tenrec Microgale jobihely has long, dark brown ungual tufts. The opossum Monodelphis handleyi has short ungual tufts.

== Bibliography ==
- Balete, D.S., Heaney, L.R., Rickart, E.A., Quidlat, R.S. and Ibanez, J.C. 2008. A new species of Batomys (Mammalia: Muridae) from eastern Mindanao Island, Philippines. Proceedings of the Biological Society of Washington 121(4):411–428.
- Bonvicino, C.R., de Oliveira, J.A. and Gentile, R. 2010. A new species of Calomys (Rodentia: Sigmodontinae) from southeastern Brazil. Zootaxa 2336:19–35.
- Carleton, M.D. and Goodman, S.M. 1996. Systematic studies of Madagascar's endemic rodents (Muroidea: Nesomyinae): a new genus and species from the central highlands. Fieldiana Zoology 85:231–256.
- Christoff, A.U., Fagundes, V., Sbalqueiro, I.J., Mattevi, M.S. and Yonenaga-Yassuda, Y. 2000. Description of a new species of Akodon (Rodentia: Sigmodontinae) from southern Brazil. Journal of Mammalogy 81(3):838–851.
- Feijoo, M., D'Elía, G., Pardiñas, U.F.J. and Lessa, E.P. 2010. Systematics of the southern Patagonian-Fueguian endemic Abrothrix lanosus (Rodentia: Sigmodontinae): Phylogenetic position, karyotypic and morphological data (subscription required). Mammalian Biology 75:122–137.
- Goodman, S.M., Raxworthy, C.J., Maminirina, C.P. and Olson, L.E. 2006. A new species of shrew tenrec (Microgale jobihely) from northern Madagascar. Journal of Zoology 270:384–398.
- Leite, Y.L.R., Christoff, A.U. and Fagundes, V. 2008. A new species of Atlantic Forest tree rat, genus Phyllomys (Rodentia, Echimyidae) from southern Brazil. Journal of Mammalogy 89:845–851.
- Musser, G.G. and Carleton, M.D. 2005. Superfamily Muroidea. Pp. 894–1531 in Wilson, D.E. and Reeder, D.M. (eds.). Mammal Species of the World: a taxonomic and geographic reference. 3rd ed. Baltimore: The Johns Hopkins University Press, 2 vols., 2142 pp. ISBN 978-0-8018-8221-0
- Pardiñas, U.F.J., Teta, P. and D'Elía, G. 2009. Taxonomy and distribution of Abrawayaomys (Rodentia: Cricetidae), an Atlantic Forest endemic with the description of a new species. Zootaxa 2128:39–60.
- Solari, S. 2007. New species of Monodelphis (Didelphimorphia: Didelphidae) from Peru, with notes on M. adusta (Thomas, 1897). Journal of Mammalogy 88:319–329.
- Weksler, M. 2006. Phylogenetic relationships of oryzomyine rodents (Muroidea: Sigmodontinae): separate and combined analyses of morphological and molecular data. Bulletin of the American Museum of Natural History 296:1–149.
