= Carpomys dakal =

Carpomys dakal Temporal range: Late Pleistocene to Holocene, 0.067–0.002 Ma

Scientific classification
- Kingdom: Animalia
- Phylum: Chordata
- Class: Mammalia
- Order: Rodentia
- Family: Muridae
- Genus: Carpomys
- Species: †C. dakal

Binomial name
- †Carpomys dakal Ochoa, Mijares, Piper, Reyes, & Heaney, 2021

Prehistoric cloud rat

Carpomys dakal, the Sierra Madre giant cloud rat, is an extinct species of cloud rat from the Late Pleistocene of Luzon, the Philippines. Its remains are known from Callao Cave in the northern part of the island, dating to about 67,000 years ago, with the most recent remains dating from 2,000-4,000 years ago.

== Description ==
Compared to other species in the genus Carpomys, C. dakal was considerably larger, similar in weight to cloud rats in the genus Phloeomys. "Dakal" means large in many languages of Northern Luzon, including in the Ibanag and Atta lamguages.

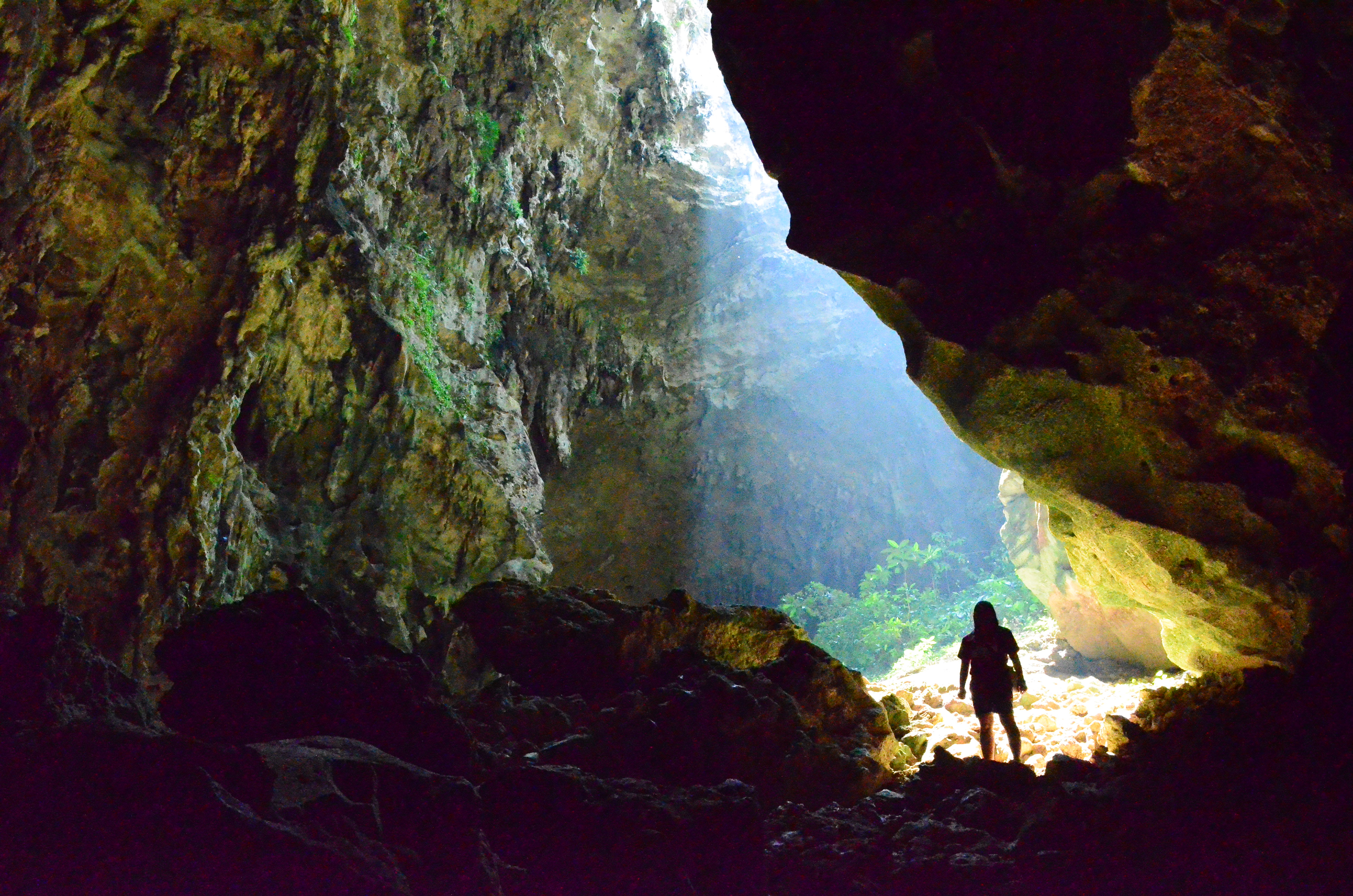
Callao Cave, where fossils of C. dakal were found

C. dakal lived alongside two other species of cloud rats, Crateromys ballik and Batomys cagayanensis, as well as the archaic human Homo luzonensis.

== Extinction ==
C. dakal went extinct due to human interventions such as hunting and deforestation, as well as the arrival of invasive species to the island. Due to its big size among cloud rats, hunting it would have been worthwhile.
