= Dwarf cloud rat =

Dwarf cloud rat may refer to:

- the genus Carpomys, especially:
  - Carpomys melanurus
