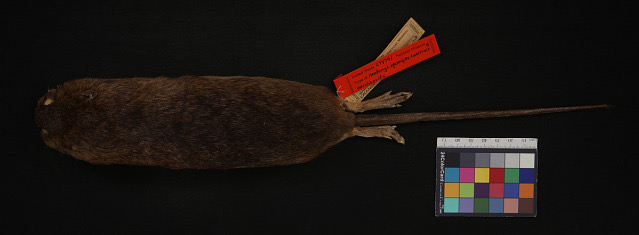

Conservation status
- Least Concern (IUCN 3.1)

Scientific classification
- Kingdom: Animalia
- Phylum: Chordata
- Class: Mammalia
- Infraclass: Placentalia
- Order: Rodentia
- Family: Cricetidae
- Subfamily: Sigmodontinae
- Genus: Nectomys
- Species: N. rattus

Binomial name
- Nectomys rattus (Pelzeln, 1883)

Synonyms
- Nectomys mattensis Thomas, 1903; Nectomys melanius Thomas, 1910; Nectomys parvipes Petter, 1979

= Nectomys rattus =

Species of rodent

Nectomys rattus, the small-footed bristly mouse, Amazonian nectomys, Amazonian mouse, or common water rat is a species of rodent in the genus Nectomys of family Cricetidae. It is found in Brazil, Colombia, French Guiana, Guyana, Suriname, and Venezuela, where it lives in a variety of habitats including lowland tropical rainforest, cerrado and caatinga. It is mainly found in areas close to water. It was recognized as distinct only in 2000 and its limits with other Nectomys, including Nectomys apicalis and Nectomys squamipes, remain unclear.

== Literature cited ==
- Catzeflis, F.; Patton, J.L.; Percequillo, A.; Bonvicino, C.R.; Weksler, M. (2017) [errata version of 2016 assessment]. "Nectomys rattus". IUCN Red List of Threatened Species. 2016 e.T14474A115122209.
- Musser, G. G.; Carleton, M. D. (2005). "Superfamily Muroidea". In Wilson, D. E.; Reeder, D. M. (eds.). Mammal Species of the World: A Taxonomic and Geographic Reference (3rd ed.). Johns Hopkins University Press. p. 1133. ISBN 978-0-8018-8221-0. OCLC 62265494.
