= Batomys uragon =

Conservation status
- Least Concern (IUCN 3.1)

Scientific classification
- Kingdom: Animalia
- Phylum: Chordata
- Class: Mammalia
- Order: Rodentia
- Family: Muridae
- Genus: Batomys
- Species: B. uragon

Binomial name
- Batomys uragon Balete et al., 2015

Species of rodent

Batomys uragon (proposed common name Mount Isarog hairy-tailed rat) is a species of cloud rat endemic to the Philippines. It was first discovered in 1988, and the full description was published in 2015, in the Proceedings of the Biological Society of Washington. It is so far found only on Luzon, the largest island in the Philippines. The first specimen was collected from Mount Isarog at the southern side of the island. Other 14 specimens were later collected. It is the fourth species of mammal (so far known) living only on that mountain. The new species was described by Danilo S. Balete, Eric A. Rickart, Lawrence R. Heaney, and Sharon A. Jansa. It was classified as new species based on DNA analyses and structural descriptions (morphometric analyses). It is different from its closest relative, the Luzon hairy-tailed rat (Batomys granti), in its cytochrome b sequence, moderate body size, colour patterns, and skull structure.

== Etymology ==
The specific name uragon is a Bicol word, the language of the local people, the Bicolanos in Luzon. Having no direct English rendering, the word is loosely translated as "possessing great ability, vitality, or power". This is to attribute the species for its dispersal ability, persistence, and uniqueness to the Bicol Peninsula.

== Discovery ==
The first specimen (now the holotype) of B. uragon was collected by Eric A. Rickart, Curator of Vertebrates at the Natural History Museum of Utah, on 25 April 1988. It is an old adult male. He found it while in the faunal expedition at Mount Isarog, about 4 km (2.5 mi) from the Naga City in Camarines Sur Province. The expedition was funded by U.S. National Science Foundation and the Smithsonian Institution. The rat was in the mossy forest, at about 1,750 metres (5,740 ft) above sea level. Later, 14 specimens were collected from around the same region. The specimens are deposited at the National Museum of Natural History, Smithsonian Institution. DNA studies were performed by Sharon A. Jansa.

== Description ==
Of the species of Batomys known to live on Mount Isarog, the large-toothed hairy-tailed rat (B. dentatus) is distinct. But B. granti is basically similar to B. uragon. B. uragon differs from B. granti in slightly larger body, longer legs, but shorter tail, and larger skull. Males are larger than females. Males measure around 19.83 cm (7.81 in) in length, while females are around 18.82 cm (7.41 in). This sexual dimorphism is almost absent in B. granti, as both males and females are about 19 cm (7.5 in). The tail length is 14.4 cm (5.7 in) in males, and 14.16 cm (5.57 in) in females. The total body weight is 178 g (6.3 oz) for males, and 177 g (6.2 oz) for females. Karyotype shows that it has 52 chromosomes (haploid, n=26). The colour of the fur is pale golden-brown. There are colour variations in individuals. One male specimen has a small pale brown patch of fur on the left side of the lower abdomen. The holotype has a pale golden fur, paler than other specimens.

== Biology ==
B. uragon only lives in high altitude regions, between 1,350 and 1,800 m (4,430 and 5,910 ft) above sea level. They live in old-growth montane and mossy forest, where there are thick leaf litters and humus layers. They eat nuts and seeds, hence, they have granivorous-frugivorous diet. They are nocturnal and good climbers.
