= Nectomys grandis =

Magdalena-Cauca water rat

Conservation status
- Data Deficient (IUCN 3.1)

Scientific classification
- Kingdom: Animalia
- Phylum: Chordata
- Class: Mammalia
- Order: Rodentia
- Family: Cricetidae
- Subfamily: Sigmodontinae
- Genus: Nectomys
- Species: N. grandis

Binomial name
- Nectomys grandis Thomas, 1897

Synonyms
- Nectomys magdalenae Thomas, 1897

Species of rodent

Nectomys grandis, also known as the Magdalena-Cauca water rat, is a nocturnal, semiaquatic species of rodent in the genus Nectomys of family Cricetidae. It is found in western and northern Colombia at altitudes from sea level to 2000 m, including the basins of the Magdalena, Cauca and Porce rivers. It has two subspecies, N. g. grandis and N. g. magdalenae.
