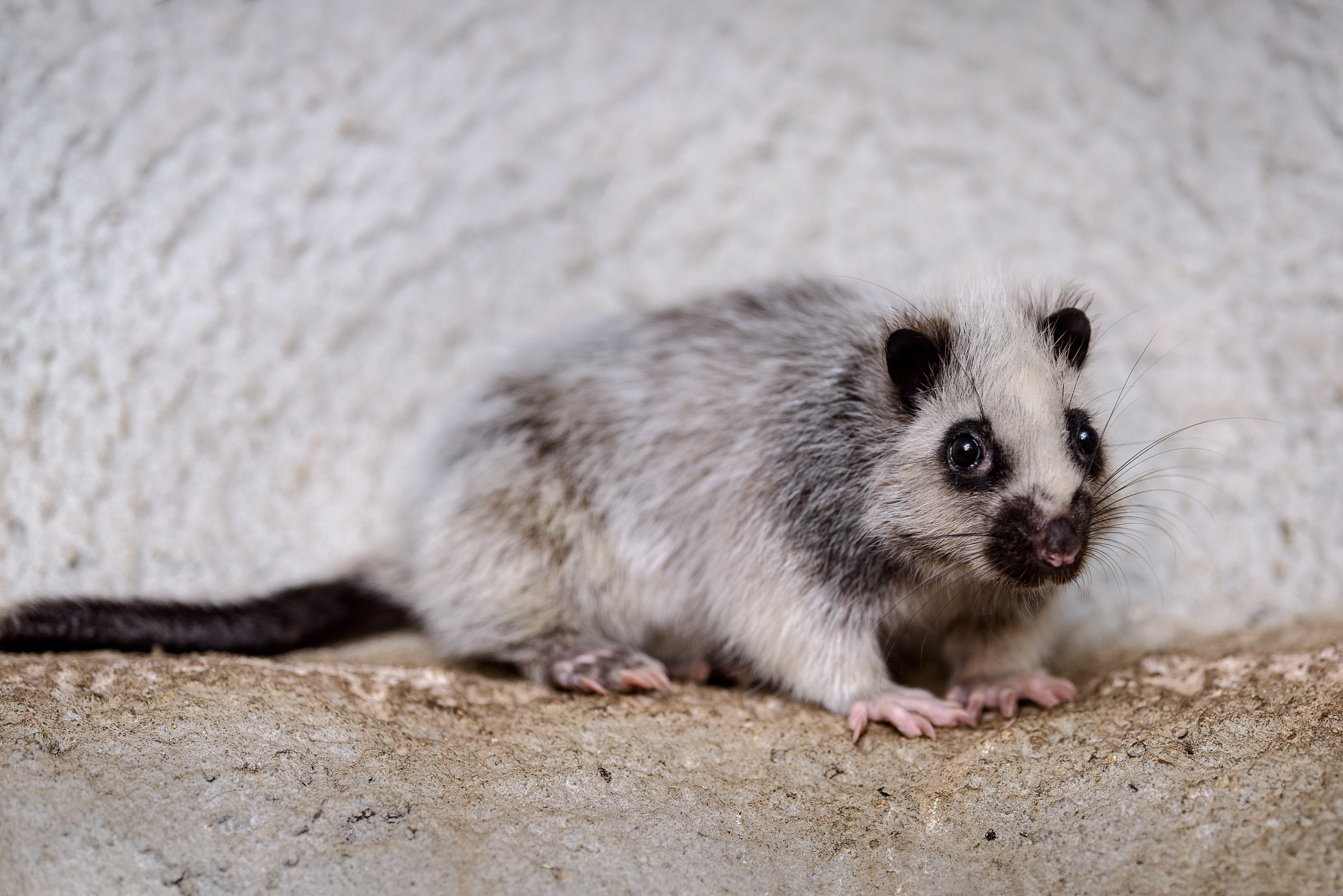

Conservation status
- Least Concern (IUCN 3.1)

Scientific classification
- Kingdom: Animalia
- Phylum: Chordata
- Class: Mammalia
- Order: Rodentia
- Family: Muridae
- Genus: Phloeomys
- Species: P. pallidus

Binomial name
- Phloeomys pallidus Nehring, 1890
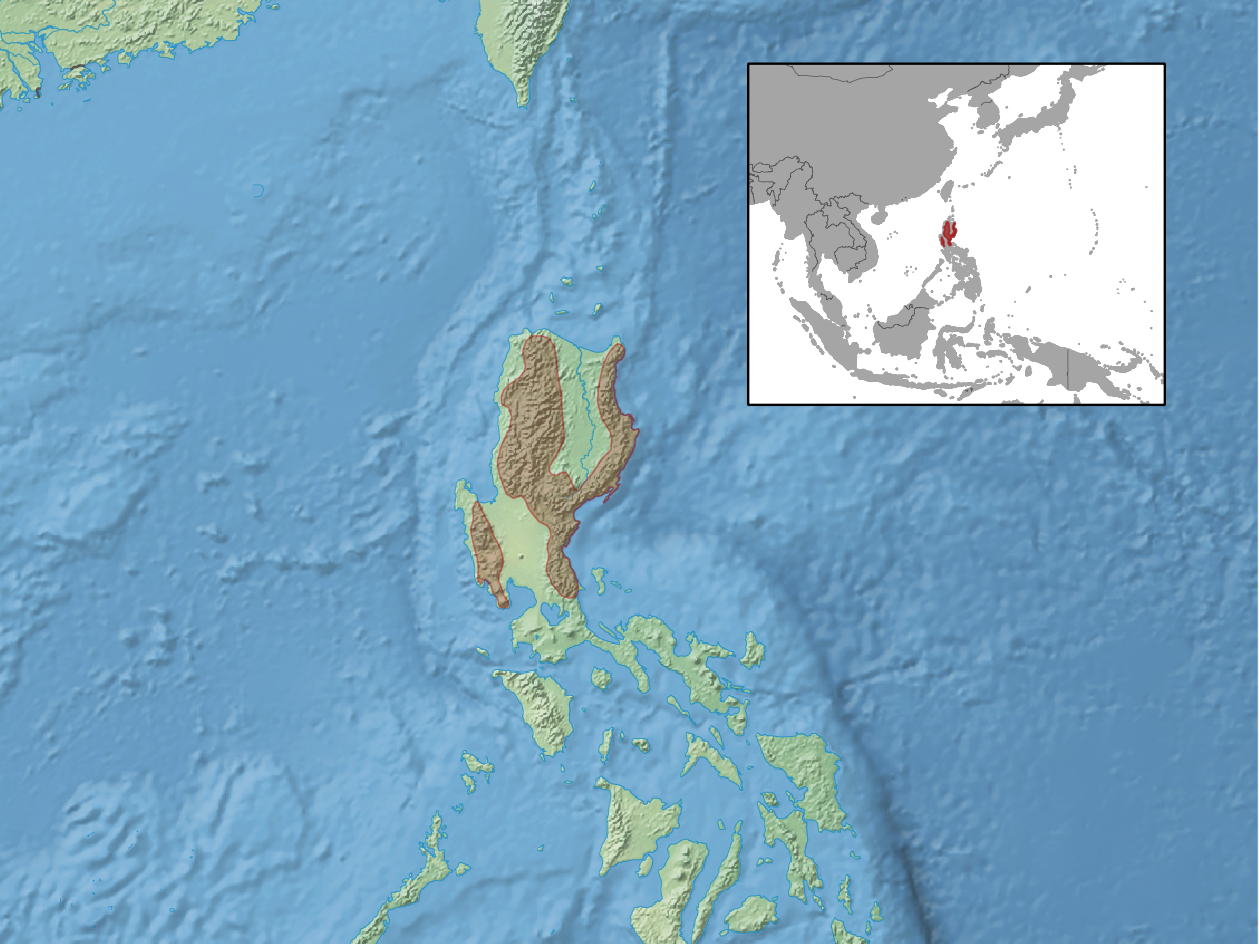

= Northern Luzon giant cloud rat =

Species of rodent

The northern Luzon giant cloud rat (Phloeomys pallidus) or northern Luzon slender-tailed cloud rat, also known as bu-ot in Tagalog, is a large species of rodent in the family Muridae. It is only found in Luzon, the Philippines.

== Appearance ==
This very large rodent weighs 1.9–2.6 kg (4.2–5.7 lb) and is 75–77 cm (29.5–30.5 in) long, including its tail. The colour of its relatively long pelage, which also covers the tail, is highly variable, but it is usually pale brown-grey or white with some dark brown or black patches. They often have a black mask and collar but can also be entirely white. The only other member of the genus Phloeomys, the southern Luzon giant cloud rat (P. cumingi), has a more southerly distribution, is generally smaller (although with some overlap), and is entirely dark brown. However, the occasional brown Northern Luzon giant cloud rat has been reported in the Mountain Province, and the taxonomic limits between the two Phloeomys are not fully resolved.

== Distribution and habitat ==
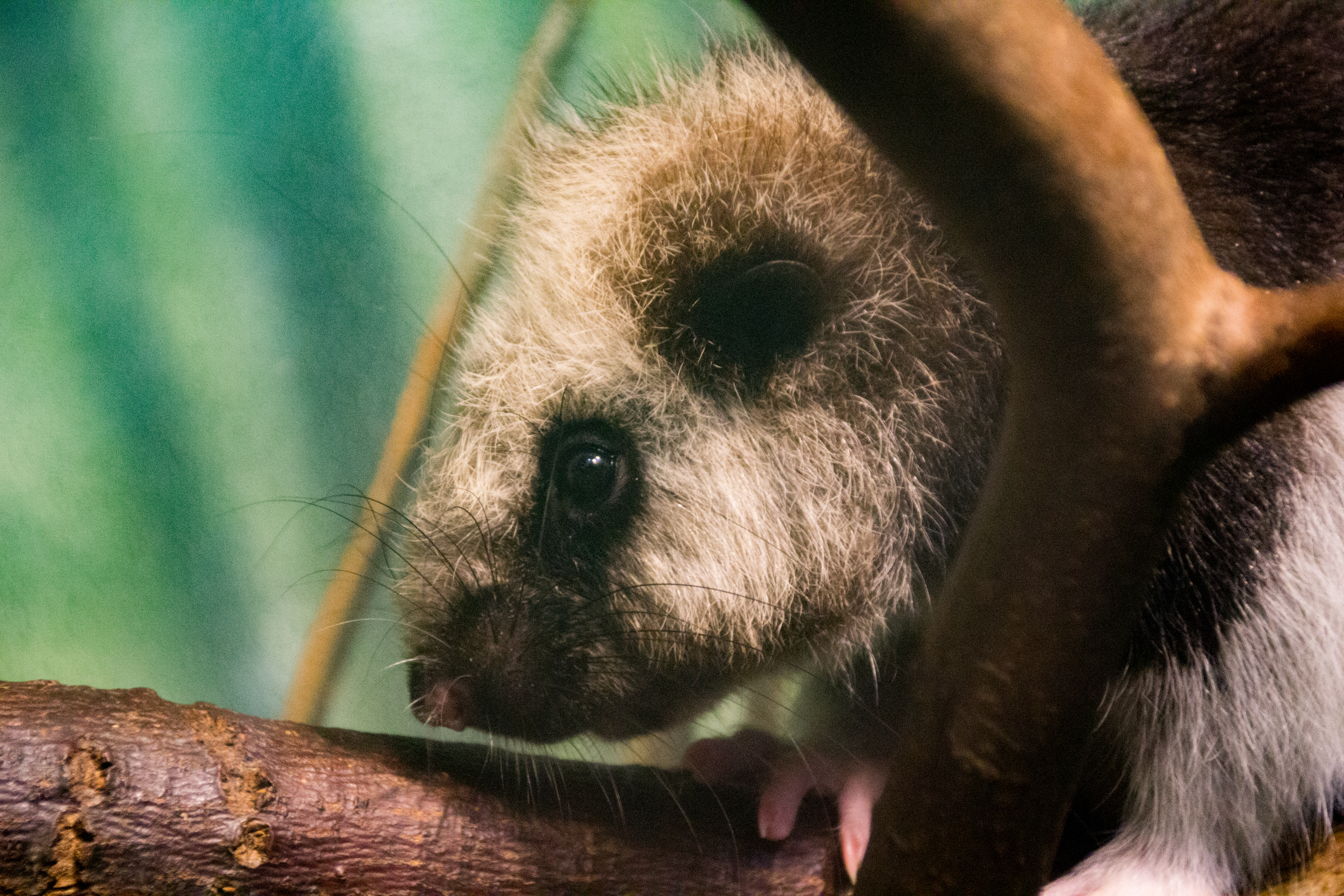
Close-up of a Northern Luzon giant cloud rat.

The northern Luzon giant cloud rat lives at elevations between sea level and 2,200 metres (7,200 ft). In some areas, it overlaps with the rarer giant bushy-tailed cloud rat, but that species mainly occurs at higher altitudes than the northern Luzon giant cloud rat.

== Behavior ==
The northern Luzon giant cloud rat is nocturnal and feeds on various types of vegetation. Because of its relatively large size, it does not enter traditional small-mammal traps, which has limited research in the species.

== Reproduction ==
Northern Luzon giant cloud rats often live in pairs with one or two dependent young. They give birth in hollow boles of trees (standing or fallen) or in burrows in the ground. The sperm head of northern Luzon giant cloud rat has a short apical hook, with the sperm tail attached off-center basally. The tail of the sperm is about 127 μm long.

== Conservation status ==
The northern Luzon giant cloud rat can cause extensive damage to rice crops and are sometimes considered a pest. They are regularly hunted for food in the Sierra Madre. It has been extirpated from some regions because of hunting, but overall it appears to be able to withstand hunting pressure and in general it remains common and widespread.

== See also ==
- Cloud rat
