= Mount Data =

Mountain in Cordillera Central, Philippines

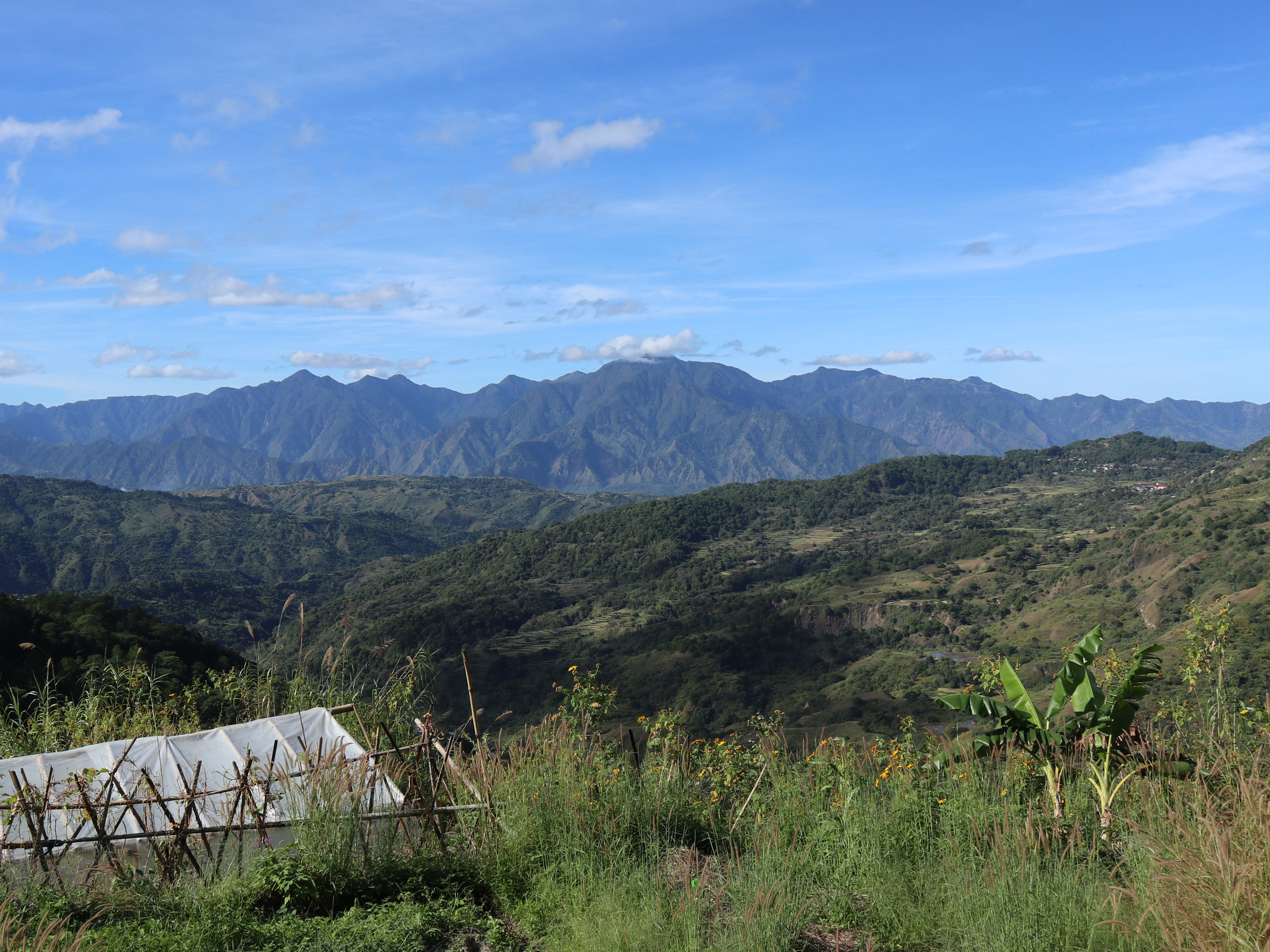

Highest point
- Elevation: 2,310 m (7,580 ft)
- Prominence: 18 m (59 ft)
- Coordinates: 16°53′0″N 120°50′48″E

Geography
- Location within Luzon Location within Philippines
- Country: Philippines
- Region: Cordillera Administrative Region
- Provinces: Benguet; Mountain Province
- Parent range: Cordillera Central

Mount Data is a mountain located in the Cordillera Central mountain range rising to a height of 2,310 metres (7,580 ft) in the north of Luzon Island, Philippines. It is about 100 kilometres (62 mi) north of Baguio on the borders of the provinces of Benguet and Mountain Province along the Halsema Highway. The mountain and surrounding area has been declared a national park since 1936. In 1940 the park was expanded to 5,513 hectares (13,620 acres). The slopes of the mountain are covered with pine forests and mossy oak forests.

The national park hosts five major rivers: the Chico, Ahin, Siffu, Abra, and Amburayan rivers. The Agno River also originates from Mount Data and flows through Benguet. The reserve is also a watershed, which serves towns in Mountain Province, Buenget, and Ifugao.

The mountain is the site of the Mount Data Peace Accord of 1986 between the government of the Philippines and the Cordillera People's Liberation Army.

== Fauna ==
Mount Data is formerly known for its great biological diversity and is a place that has long been in the attention of biologists. In 1895, the Englishman John Whitehead gathered a vast collection of mammals and birds from the mountain. This mammal collection was then donated to the British Museum. A research by zoologist Oldfield Thomas showed that many unknown species inhabit the area. Half a century later, a large collection of small mammals was collected by an expedition led by the Filipino biologist Dioscoro S. Rabor. Some of these mammals are Carpomys melanurus (short-footed Luzon tree rat) and Carpomys phaeurus (white-bellied Luzon tree rat). In addition to several rare species of mammals, there are also some bird species like the Collocalia whiteheadi (Whitehead's swiftlet), which was only known then from a specimen that was caught during the expedition of John Whitehead on the mountain.

Carpomys melanurus (greater dwarf cloud rat) was first found on Mount Data in 1896.

== See also ==
- List of mountains in the Philippines
- List of national parks of the Philippines
