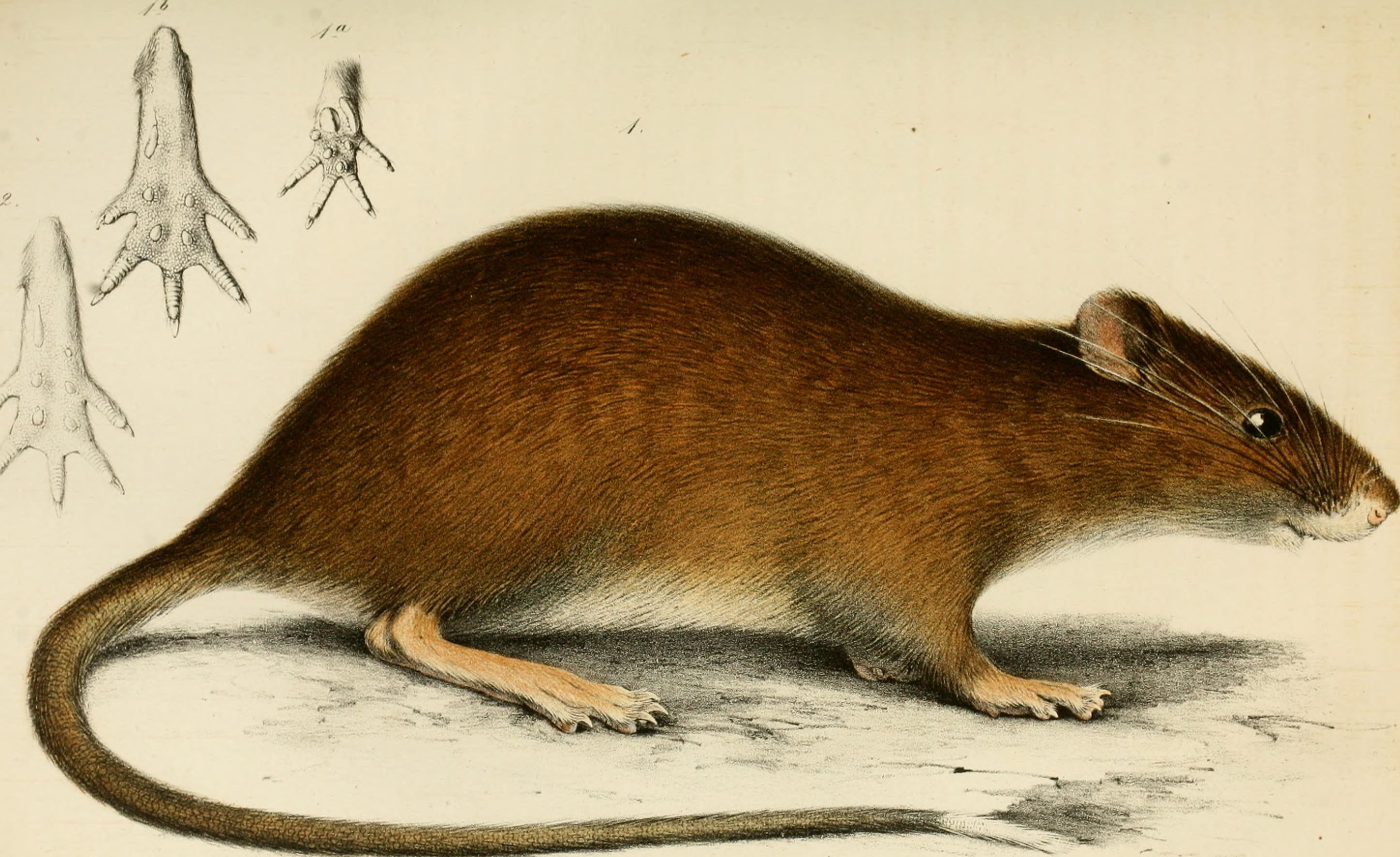
- Nectomys apicalis

Scientific classification
- Domain: Eukaryota
- Kingdom: Animalia
- Phylum: Chordata
- Class: Mammalia
- Order: Rodentia
- Family: Cricetidae
- Subfamily: Sigmodontinae
- Tribe: Oryzomyini
- Genus: Nectomys; Peters, 1861

Type species
- Mus squamipes

Species
- Nectomys apicalis Nectomys grandis Nectomys palmipes Nectomys rattus Nectomys squamipes

= Nectomys =

Nectomys Temporal range: Pleistocene - Recent

Genus of mammals

Nectomys (Note: From the Greek nēktos "swimming" and mys "mouse, rat".) is a genus of rodent in the tribe Oryzomyini of family Cricetidae. It is closely related to Amphinectomys and was formerly considered congeneric with Sigmodontomys. It consists of five species, which are allopatrically distributed across much of South America: Nectomys grandis in montane Colombia; Nectomys palmipes on Trinidad and in nearby Venezuela, Nectomys apicalis in the western margins of the Amazon biome, Nectomys rattus in much of Amazonia, and Nectomys squamipes in the Atlantic Forest of Brazil. These species are generally semiaquatic, are normally found near water, and are commonly called water rats.

== Literature cited ==
- Musser, G. G.; Carleton, M. D. (2005). "Superfamily Muroidea". In Wilson, D. E.; Reeder, D. M. (eds.). Mammal Species of the World: A Taxonomic and Geographic Reference (3rd ed.). Johns Hopkins University Press. pp. 1132–1133. ISBN 978-0-8018-8221-0. OCLC 62265494.
