= Musseromys =

Scientific classification
- Kingdom: Animalia
- Phylum: Chordata
- Class: Mammalia
- Order: Rodentia
- Family: Muridae
- Tribe: Phloeomyini
- Genus: Musseromys; Heaney, Balete, Rickart, Veluz & Jansa, 2009

Type species
- Musseromys gulantang Heaney, Balete, Rickart, Veluz & Jansa, 2009

Species
- 4, see text

Genus of rodents

Musseromys is a genus of rodent, in the family Muridae, endemic to the Philippines. Four species are known, all from Luzon:

- Musseromys anacuao - Sierra Madre tree-mouse
- Musseromys beneficus - Mount Pulag tree-mouse
- Musseromys gulantang - Banahaw tree-mouse
- Musseromys inopinatus - Amuyao tree-mouse

== Description ==
All members of the genus are small murids weighing between 15 and 22 grams. They have tails (82 - 101 mm) usually longer than the rest of their bodies (74 - 84 mm).
