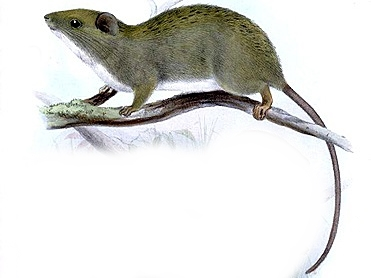

Conservation status
- Least Concern (IUCN 3.1)

Scientific classification
- Kingdom: Animalia
- Phylum: Chordata
- Class: Mammalia
- Order: Rodentia
- Family: Muridae
- Genus: Carpomys
- Species: C. phaeurus

Binomial name
- Carpomys phaeurus Thomas, 1895
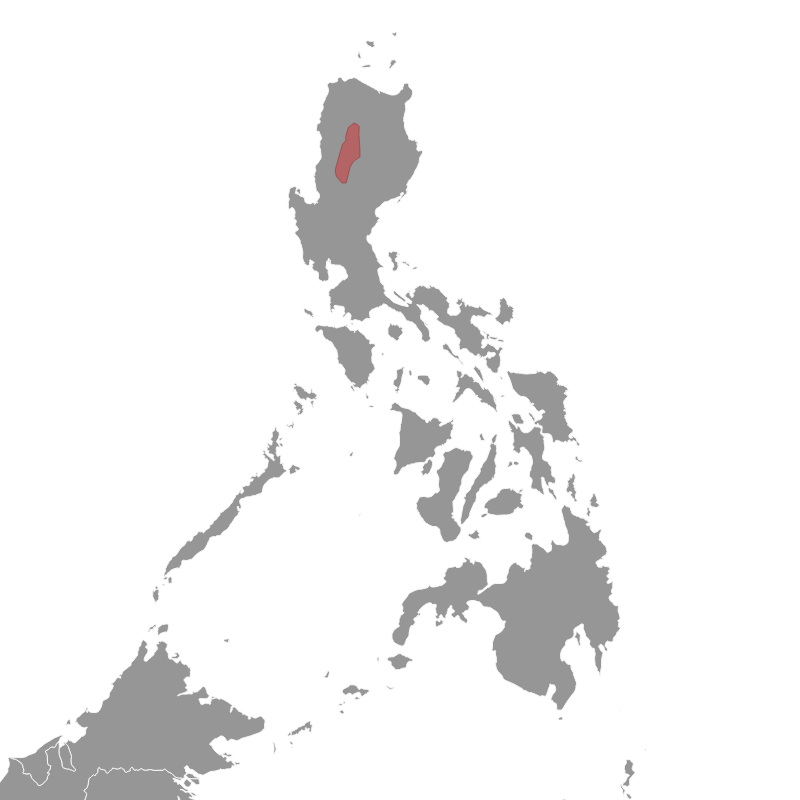

= Carpomys phaeurus =

Species of rodent

The White-bellied Luzon tree rat (Carpomys phaeurus) is a species of rodent in the family Muridae. It is found only in the Philippines, in the northern Luzon island. Its natural habitat is subtropical or tropical dry forests, in the Cordillera Central mountains. It has been found at elevations between 2,100 metres (6,900 ft) to 2,500 metres (8,200 ft), but likely occurs down to 1,600 metres (5,200 ft).

== Taxonomy ==
Carpomys phaeurus was first described by Oldfield Thomas in 1895, from specimens collected by local people and brought to Britain by John Whitehead. Whitehead described it as "somewhat rare" in the area where it was collected. It is known from the holotype and one other specimen collected in 1895, and two specimens collected in 1946 and 2003. It is one of two living species in the genus Carpomys.

== Description ==
C. phaeurus has thick fur, brownish-yellow in color, with a dull white belly and a dark brown short-furred tail. It has a "mask" of dark fur around the eyes. Adults are 322 millimetres (12.7 in) to 336 millimetres (13.2 in) long, of which the tail is 156 millimetres (6.1 in) to 161 millimetres (6.3 in). The adult weight is approximately 123 grams (4.3 oz). It can be distinguished from the other species of the genus, C. melanurus by its smaller size, the color of the tail, and its smaller teeth.

The white-bellied Luzon tree rat has a generational length of two years. They are likely nocturnal, arboreal, and seed-eating, but there is very limited data about the species. The specimens caught in 1895 were collected from burrows under the roots of trees. As the high-elevation habitat of the species faces minimal threats, the species is listed as Least Concern by the IUCN. The population at the type locality, Mount Data, may be extinct, as recent surveys have failed to find any specimens.
