= Nectomys palmipes =

Conservation status
- Least Concern (IUCN 3.1)

Scientific classification
- Kingdom: Animalia
- Phylum: Chordata
- Class: Mammalia
- Order: Rodentia
- Family: Cricetidae
- Subfamily: Sigmodontinae
- Genus: Nectomys
- Species: N. palmipes

Binomial name
- Nectomys palmipes Allen and Chapman, 1893

Synonyms
- Nectomys squamipes tatei Hershkovitz, 1948

Species of rodent

Nectomys palmipes, also known as the Trinidad nectomys or Trinidad water rat, is a species of semiaquatic rodent in genus Nectomys of family Cricetidae. It is found on the island of Trinidad and on the nearby mainland of Venezuela.

== Literature cited ==
- Musser, G. G.; Carleton, M. D. (2005). "Superfamily Muroidea". In Wilson, D. E.; Reeder, D. M. (eds.). Mammal Species of the World: A Taxonomic and Geographic Reference (3rd ed.). Johns Hopkins University Press. p. 1132. ISBN 978-0-8018-8221-0. OCLC 62265494.
- Ochoa, J.; Aguilera, M.; Rivas, B.; Weksler, M. (2017) [errata version of 2016 assessment]. "Nectomys palmipes". IUCN Red List of Threatened Species. 2016 e.T14473A115122088.
