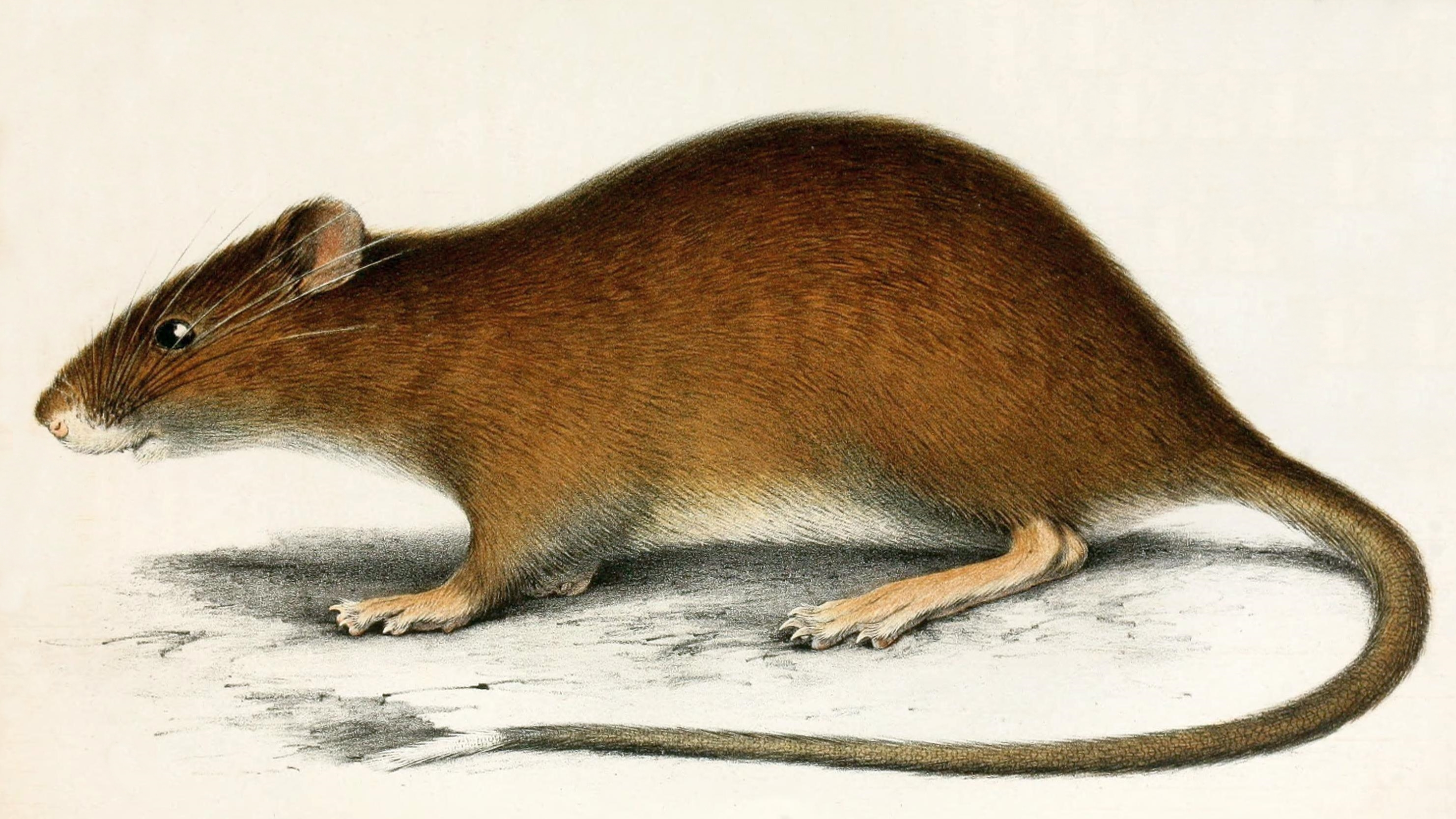

Conservation status
- Least Concern (IUCN 3.1)

Scientific classification
- Kingdom: Animalia
- Phylum: Chordata
- Class: Mammalia
- Order: Rodentia
- Family: Cricetidae
- Subfamily: Sigmodontinae
- Genus: Nectomys
- Species: N. apicalis

Binomial name
- Nectomys apicalis Peters, 1861

= Nectomys apicalis =

Species of rodent

Nectomys apicalis, also known as the western Amazonian nectomys, is a semiaquatic species of rodent in the family Cricetidae. It is found east of the Andes in Ecuador, Peru, and Bolivia, east into western Brazil; further to the east, it is replaced by N. rattus. It lives near watercourses in lowland tropical rainforest. Its karyotype has 2n = 38–42, and it probably actually represents several distinct undescribed species.

== Literature cited ==
- Gómez-Laverde, M.; Rivas, B.; Weksler, M. (2017) [errata version of 2016 assessment]. "Nectomys apicalis". IUCN Red List of Threatened Species. 2016 e.T136756A115212191.
- Musser, G. G.; Carleton, M. D. (2005). "Superfamily Muroidea". In Wilson, D. E.; Reeder, D. M. (eds.). Mammal Species of the World: A Taxonomic and Geographic Reference (3rd ed.). Johns Hopkins University Press. p. 1132. ISBN 978-0-8018-8221-0. OCLC 62265494.
