= Sierra Madre tree-mouse =

Conservation status
- Data Deficient (IUCN 3.1)

Scientific classification
- Kingdom: Animalia
- Phylum: Chordata
- Class: Mammalia
- Order: Rodentia
- Family: Muridae
- Genus: Musseromys
- Species: M. anacuao

Binomial name
- Musseromys anacuao Heaney, Balete, Rickart, Veluz & Jansa, 2014

Species of rodent

The Sierra Madre tree-mouse (Musseromys anacuao) is a species of rodent in the family Muridae. It is found in the forest of the northern Sierra Madre in Luzon, Philippines.

== Description ==
As for all members of the genus Musseromys, they are small murids weighing between 15 and 22 grams. They have tails (82–101 mm) usually longer than the rest of their bodies (74–84 mm).

Two adult specimens were collected, now in the collections of the Field Museum of Natural History (FMNH):

- an adult female (♀) (FMNH 209522, holotype),
- an adult male (♂) (FMNH 209523).

Their measurements are as follows :

Measurements of the holotype (adult ♀) and 1 other specimen (adult ♂) of Musseromys anacuao
Attribute	FMNH 209522 (holotype, ♀)	FMNH 209523 (♂)
Head-body length (mm)	83	74
Tail length (mm)	82	86
Weight (g)	21	17

== Conservation ==
Data on this species endemic to the Philippines is, as of now, known from only one location. This particularity, alongside a lack of knowledge on habitats and potential threats of the species, brought the IUCN to assess the Sierra Madre tree-mouse as "Data Deficient".
