= Amuyao tree-mouse =

Conservation status
- Data Deficient (IUCN 3.1)

Scientific classification
- Kingdom: Animalia
- Phylum: Chordata
- Class: Mammalia
- Order: Rodentia
- Family: Muridae
- Genus: Musseromys
- Species: M. inopinatus

Binomial name
- Musseromys inopinatus Heaney, Balete, Rickart, Veluz & Jansa, 2014

Species of rodent

The Amuyao tree-mouse (Musseromys inopinatus) is a species of rodent in the family Muridae. It is found on Mount Amuyao in Luzon, Philippines.

== Description ==
As for all members of the genus Musseromys, they are small murids weighing between 15 and 22 grams. They have tails (82–101 mm) usually longer than the rest of their bodies (74–84 mm).

Two adult specimens were collected, now in the collections of the Field Museum of Natural History (FMNH):

- an adult male (♂) (FMNH 193839, holotype)
- an adult female (♀) (FMNH 193840).

Their measurements are as follows :

Measurements of the holotype (adult ♂) and 1 other specimen (adult ♀) of Musseromys inopinatus
Attribute	FMNH 193839 (♂, holotype)	FMNH 193840 (♀)
Head-body length (mm)	78	78
Tail length (mm)	88	85
Weight (g)	19.5	17

== Conservation ==
Data on this species endemic to the Philippines is, as of now, known from only one location. This particularity, alongside a lack of knowledge on the repartition and abundance of the species, brought the IUCN to assess the Amuyao tree-mouse as "Data Deficient".
