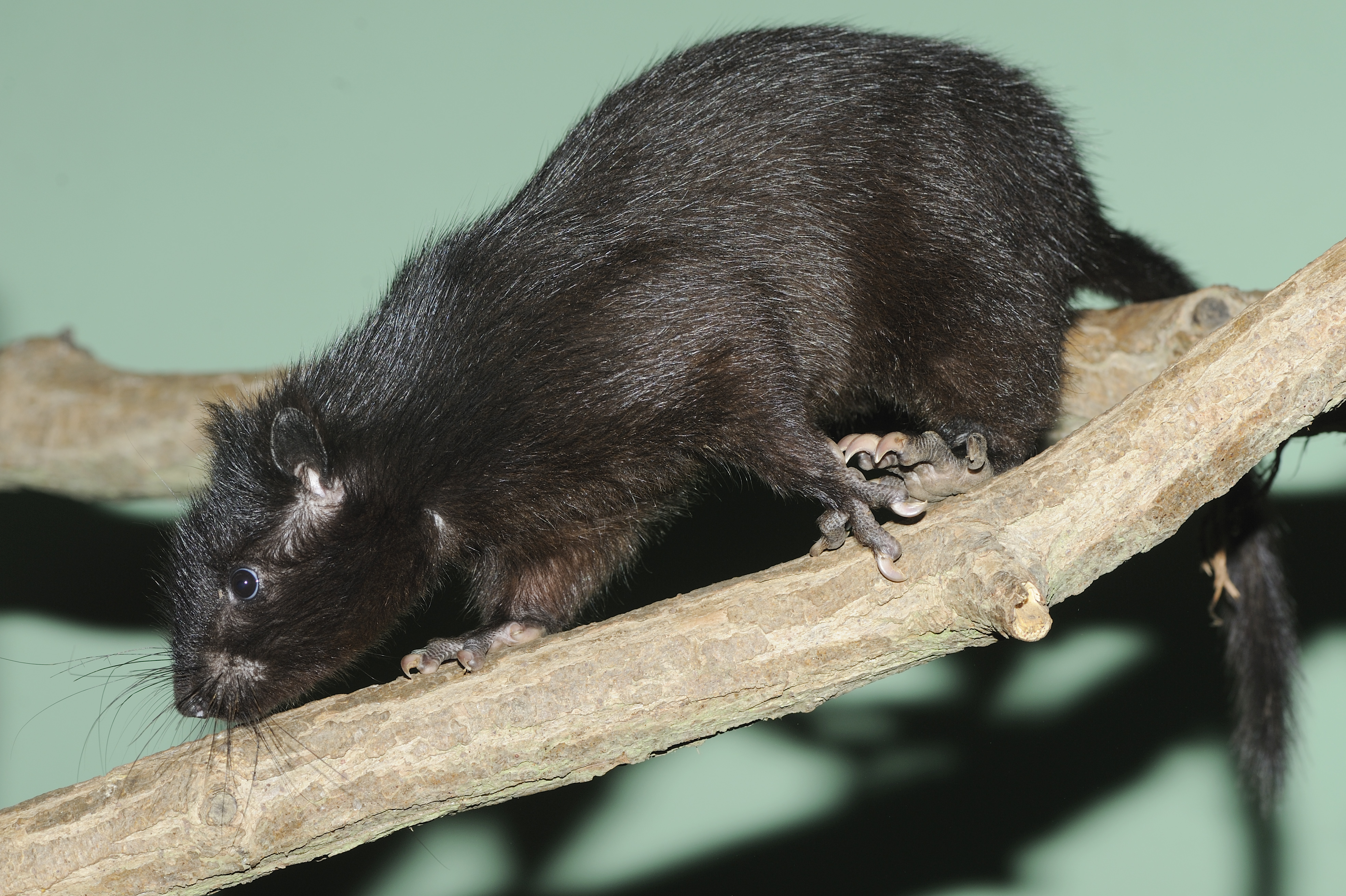

Conservation status
- Least Concern (IUCN 3.1)

Scientific classification
- Kingdom: Animalia
- Phylum: Chordata
- Class: Mammalia
- Order: Rodentia
- Family: Muridae
- Genus: Phloeomys
- Species: P. cumingi

Binomial name
- Phloeomys cumingi (Waterhouse, 1839)
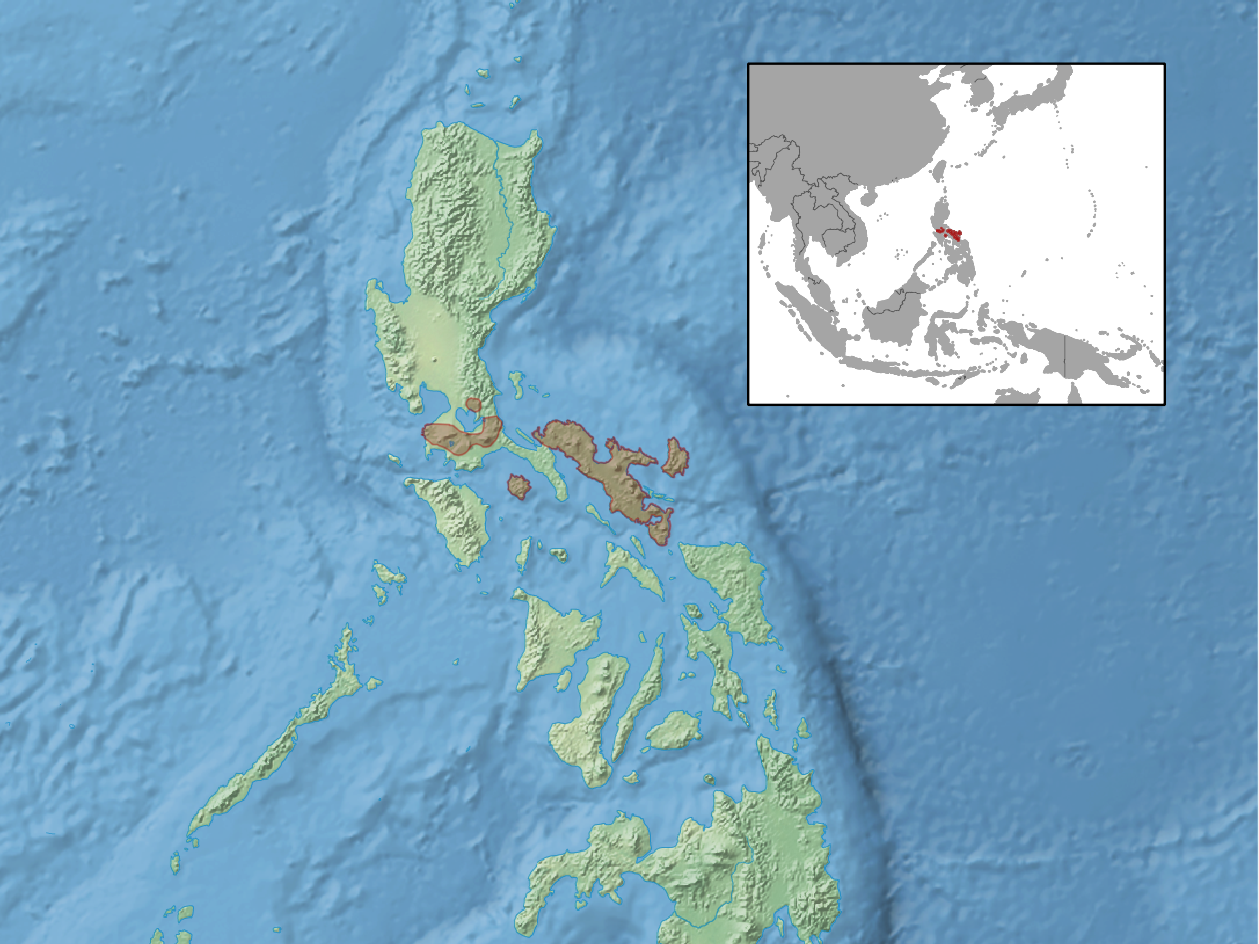

Synonyms
- Capromys elegans Cabrera, 1901

= Southern giant slender-tailed cloud rat =

Species of rodent

The southern giant slender-tailed cloud rat or southern Luzon giant cloud rat (Phloeomys cumingi), also known as bugkon in Filipino, is a species of rodent in the family Muridae, found only in southern Luzon in the Philippines. It is dark brown, occasionally with some reddish, but lacking the light-coloured sections usually seen in its close relative, the northern Luzon giant cloud rat (P. pallidus). The southern giant slender-tailed cloud rat is a large rodent that has a total length of about 67–75 cm (26–30 in) and weighs 1.45–2.1 kg (3.2–4.6 lb).

Equally at home high amongst the branches of a tree as on the forest floor, the southern giant slender-tailed cloud rat is a slow-moving animal only active at night, spending the day in hollow trees or logs. It usually lives singly, or in pairs consisting of an adult male and female, or a female and her young, but larger groups have also been seen. Their diet consists primarily of tender, young leaves, but fruit is also reportedly eaten. The southern giant slender-tailed cloud rat typically gives birth to a single pup each year, with data indicating that most births take place during the late rainy season. The young are born in the hollow of a standing or fallen tree, or in a hole in the ground. The mother carries her young firmly attached to a nipple. In captivity, one cloud rat lived for over 13 years.
