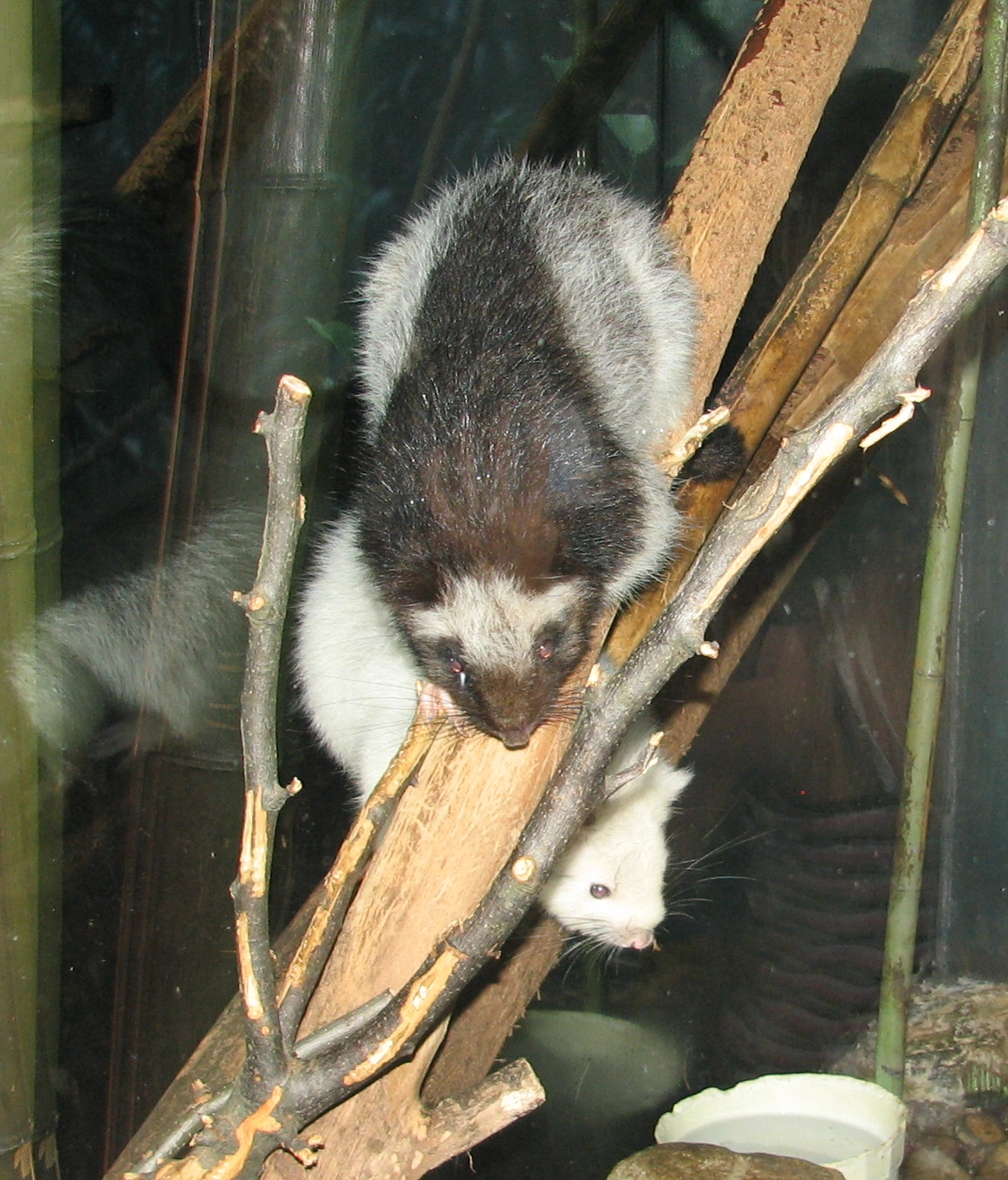
- Northern Luzon giant cloud rat (Phloeomys pallidus)

Scientific classification
- Kingdom: Animalia
- Phylum: Chordata
- Class: Mammalia
- Order: Rodentia
- Family: Muridae
- Tribe: Phloeomyini
- Genus: Phloeomys; Waterhouse, 1839

Type species
- Mus (Phloeomys) cumingi

Species
- Phloeomys cumingi Phloeomys pallidus

= Phloeomys =

Phloeomys Temporal range: Holocene

Genus of rodents

Phloeomys, the slender-tailed cloud rats, is a genus of large rodents in the family Muridae. Both species in this genus are endemic to the island of Luzon in the Philippines. Although their tail is covered by hairs, it is considerably less dense and shorter than in the rarer bushy-tailed cloud rats (genus Crateromys) that also inhabit the Philippines.

== Species ==
Phloeomys contains two species, but the taxonomic limits between them are not fully resolved.

- Southern Luzon giant (or slender-tailed) cloud rat (Phloeomys cumingi)
- Northern Luzon giant (or slender-tailed) cloud rat (Phloeomys pallidus)

== See also ==
- Cloud rat
