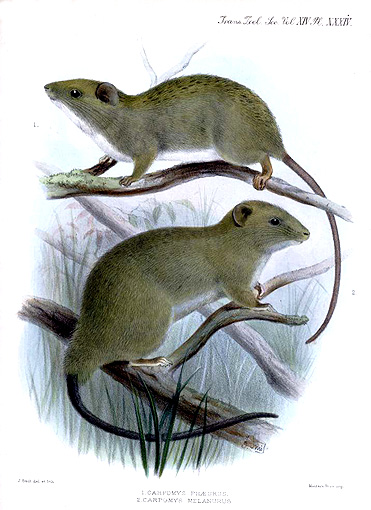
- Carpomys phaeurus (upper animal) and Carpomys melanurus (lower animal)

Scientific classification
- Domain: Eukaryota
- Kingdom: Animalia
- Phylum: Chordata
- Class: Mammalia
- Order: Rodentia
- Family: Muridae
- Tribe: Phloeomyini
- Genus: Carpomys; Thomas, 1895

Type species
- Carpomys melanurus

Species
- Carpomys melanurus Carpomys phaeurus

= Carpomys =

Carpomys Temporal range: Holocene

Genus of rodents

Carpomys is a genus of rodent in the family Muridae. It contains two extant species, and one extinct species:

- Carpomys melanurus
- Carpomys phaeurus
- †Carpomys dakal

It was first described by Oldfield Thomas in 1895, based on specimens collected by John Whitehead.
