= Mount Pulag tree-mouse =

Conservation status
- Data Deficient (IUCN 3.1)

Scientific classification
- Kingdom: Animalia
- Phylum: Chordata
- Class: Mammalia
- Order: Rodentia
- Family: Muridae
- Genus: Musseromys
- Species: M. beneficus

Binomial name
- Musseromys beneficus Heaney, Balete, Rickart, Veluz & Jansa, 2014

Species of rodent

The Mount Pulag tree-mouse (Musseromys beneficus) is a species of rodent in the family Muridae. It is found on Mount Pulag in Luzon, Philippines.

== Description ==
As for all members of the genus Musseromys, they are small murids weighing between 15 and 22 g (0.53 and 0.78 oz). They have tails of 82–101 mm (3.2–4.0 in) which are usually longer than the rest of their bodies 74–84 mm (2.9–3.3 in).

Three adult specimens were collected, now in the collections of the Field Museum of Natural History (FMNH):

- an adult female (♀) (FMNH 198713),
- an adult female (♀) (FMNH 198714, holotype),
- an adult male (♂) (FMNH 198857).

Their measurements are as follows :

Measurements of the holotype (adult ♀) and 2 other specimens (1 adult ♀ & 1 ♂) of Musseromys beneficus
Attribute	FMNH 198713 (♀)	FMNH 198714 (♀, holotype)	FMNH 198857 (♂)
Head-body length (mm)	75	81	84
Tail length (mm)	82	82	88
Weight (g)	18	22	22

== Conservation ==
Data on this species endemic to the Philippines is, as of now, known from only one location. This particularity, alongside lack of knowledge on habitats and potential threats of the species, brought the IUCN to assess the Mount Pulag tree-mouse as "Data Deficient".
