= Banahaw tree mouse =

Conservation status
- Data Deficient (IUCN 3.1)

Scientific classification
- Kingdom: Animalia
- Phylum: Chordata
- Class: Mammalia
- Order: Rodentia
- Family: Muridae
- Genus: Musseromys
- Species: M. gulantang

Binomial name
- Musseromys gulantang Heaney, Balete, Rickart, Veluz & Jansa, 2009
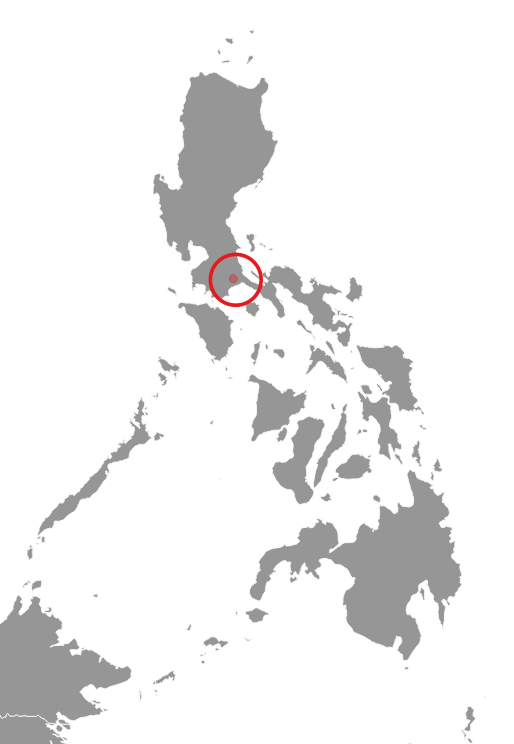

Species of rodent

Banahaw tree mouse (Musseromys gulantang) is a species of rodent in the family of Muridae. It is named after Mount Banahaw in Luzon, Philippines.
