= Dinagat hairy-tailed rat =

Conservation status
- Endangered (IUCN 3.1)

Scientific classification
- Kingdom: Animalia
- Phylum: Chordata
- Class: Mammalia
- Order: Rodentia
- Family: Muridae
- Genus: Batomys
- Species: B. russatus

Binomial name
- Batomys russatus Musser, Heaney, and Tabaranza, Jr., 1998.
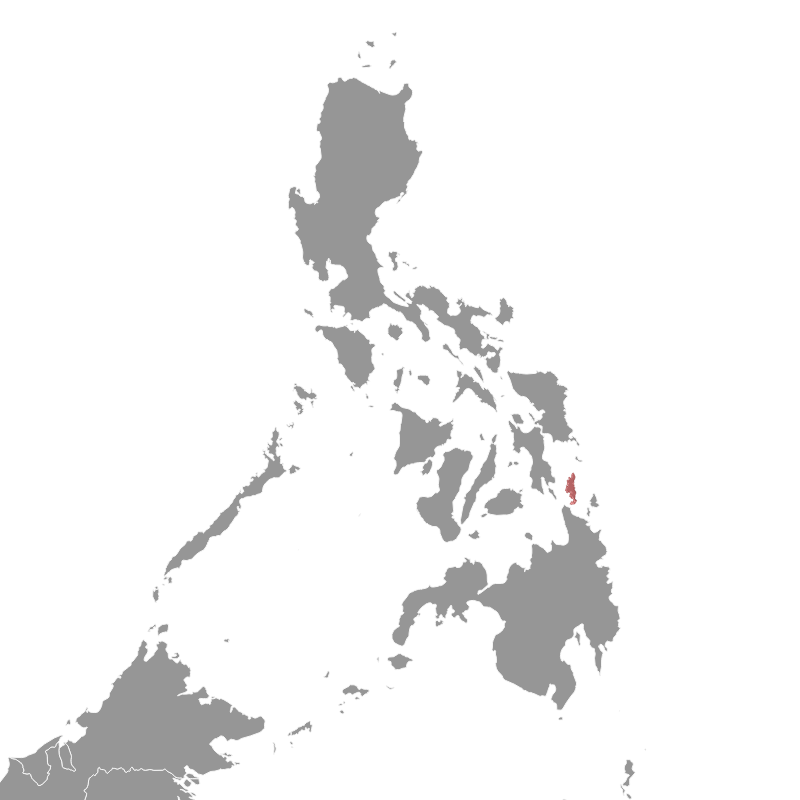

Species of rodent

Dinagat hairy-tailed rat or russet batomys (Batomys russatus) is one of five species of rodent in the genus Batomys. It is in the diverse family Muridae. This species is endemic to the Philippines.

== Distribution ==
This rat is found on Dinagat Island and possibly on other islands nearby. Further surveys have yet to be carried out, but it is currently endangered according to the IUCN.
