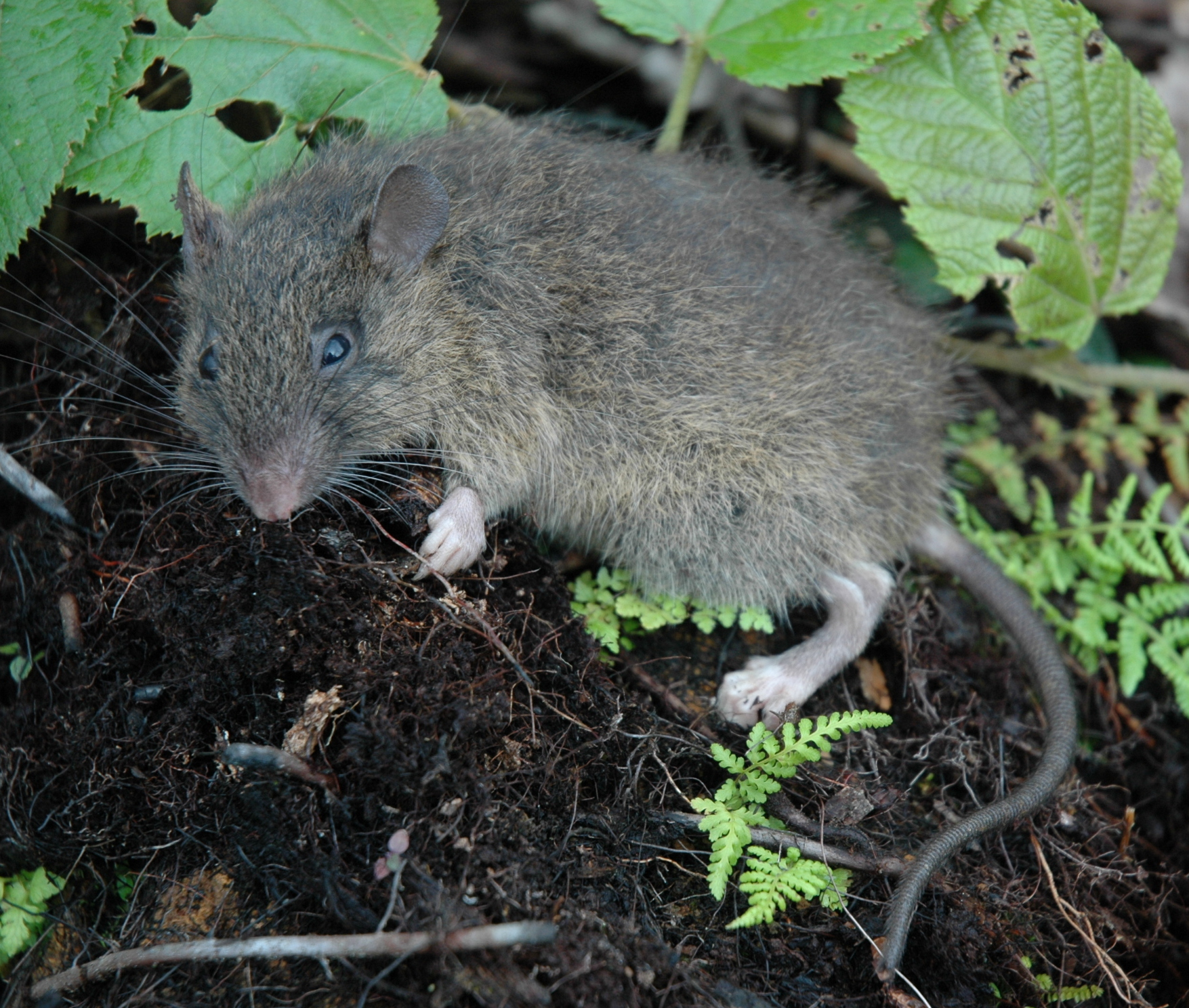

Conservation status
- Least Concern (IUCN 3.1)

Scientific classification
- Kingdom: Animalia
- Phylum: Chordata
- Class: Mammalia
- Order: Rodentia
- Family: Muridae
- Genus: Batomys
- Species: B. salomonseni

Binomial name
- Batomys salomonseni (Sanborn, 1953)
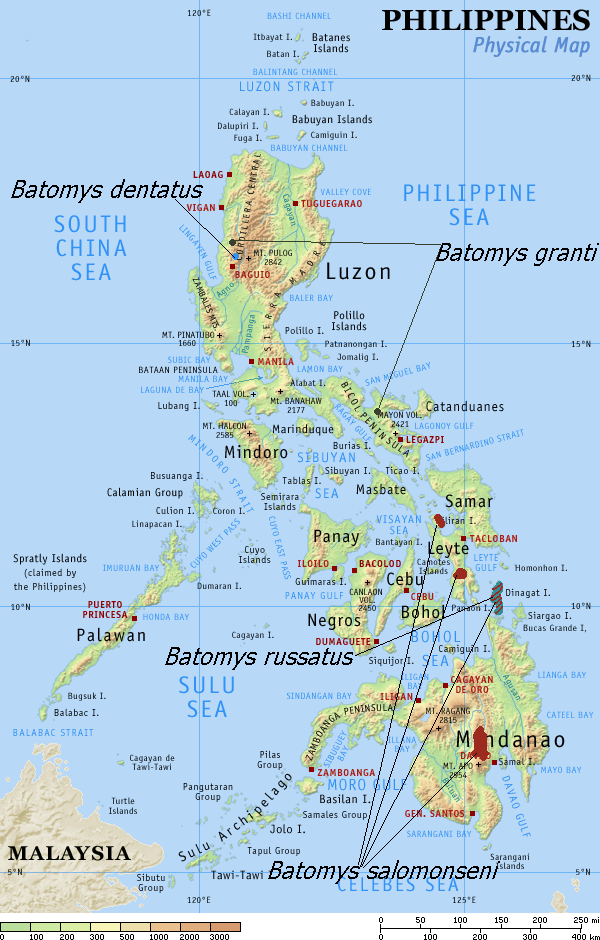
- Distribution of Batomys species

= Mindanao hairy-tailed rat =

Species of rodent

The Mindanao hairy-tailed rat (Batomys salomonseni) is one of five species of rodent in the genus Batomys. It is in the diverse family Muridae. This species is found only in the Philippines.
