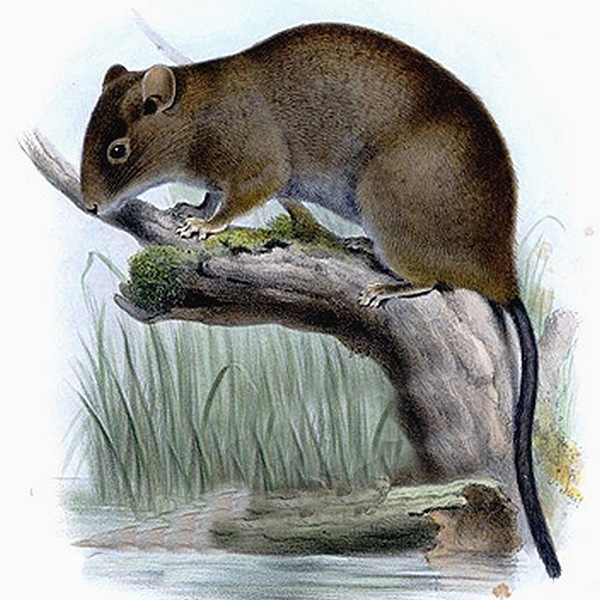
- Batomys granti

Scientific classification
- Kingdom: Animalia
- Phylum: Chordata
- Class: Mammalia
- Infraclass: Placentalia
- Order: Rodentia
- Family: Muridae
- Tribe: Phloeomyini
- Genus: Batomys; Thomas, 1895

Type species
- Batomys granti

Species
- Batomys cagayanensis Batomys dentatus Batomys granti Batomys hamiguitan Batomys russatus Batomys salomonseni Batomys uragon
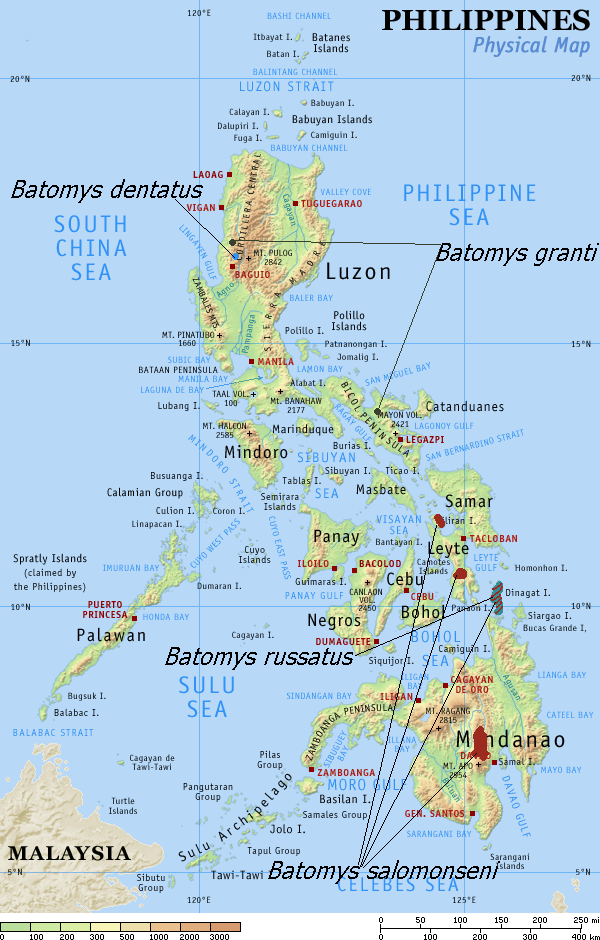
- Distribution of Batomys

= Batomys =

Genus of rodents

Batomys is a genus of rodent endemic to the Philippines. It has six extant described species.

== Species ==
Genus Batomys - Luzon and Mindanao forest rats, 7 species recognized, six extant and one extinct:

- Large-toothed hairy-tailed rat, Batomys dentatus Miller, 1911
- Luzon hairy-tailed rat, Batomys granti Thomas, 1895
- Hamiguitan hairy-tailed rat, Batomys hamiguitan Balete, Heaney, Rickart, Quidlat & Ibanez, 2008
- Dinagat hairy-tailed rat, Batomys russatus Musser, Heaney & Tabaranza Jr., 1998
- Mindanao hairy-tailed rat, Batomys salomonseni (Sanborn, 1953)
- Batomys uragon Balete, Rickart, Heaney & Jansa, 2015
- † Batomys cagayanensis Ochoa, Mijares, Piper, Reyes, & Heaney, 2021
