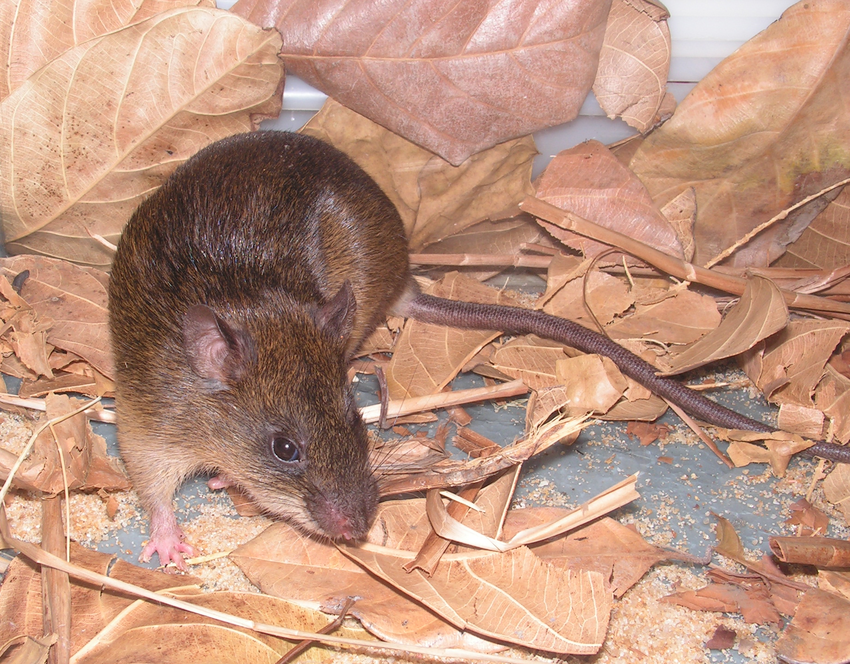

Conservation status
- Least Concern (IUCN 3.1)

Scientific classification
- Kingdom: Animalia
- Phylum: Chordata
- Class: Mammalia
- Infraclass: Placentalia
- Order: Rodentia
- Family: Cricetidae
- Subfamily: Sigmodontinae
- Genus: Nectomys
- Species: N. squamipes

Binomial name
- Nectomys squamipes (Brants, 1827)

= Nectomys squamipes =

Species of rodent

Nectomys squamipes, also known as the Atlantic Forest nectomys, South American water rat, or scaly-footed water rat, is a semiaquatic insectivorous rodent species. It is from Argentina, Brazil, and Paraguay — found primarily near forest rivers and streams in the Atlantic Forest ecoregion.

== Description ==
Nectomys squamipes, or the South American water rat can be distinguished from other Sigmodontinae based on their size and morphology of their hindfeet. They are the largest of the family (average of 216g) and have long hind legs with partially webbed feet to aid in swimming and have completely scaled heels. Nectomys is derived from Greek words meaning "mouse" and "swimming". One unique morphological characteristic is the distinct primitive cuspidate pattern of their cheekteeth, which have hypsodont molars, teeth crowned earlier in life and the outer fold of the upper molars tend to be more isolated as enamel islands. The Nectomys squamipe tends to have relatively longer, less hairy ears and a glossy, long pelage. This pelage is made up of wool hairs and guard hairs and is darker dorsally and tends to be lighter grey on its sides and ventrally. The tail is much less covered in hair, and length is around 75% of the body length.

N. squamipes have a larger skull that occupies well-developed supraorbital ridges and lambdoidal crests, giving the mammal great attachments for jaw muscles and a strong bite. This strong bite is shown useful with its large, strong incisors that are greatly curved.

== Distribution and habitat ==
The South American water rat inhabits elevations from sea level to around 2,000 m, in areas from the northern coast of South America to Brazil, Argentina and the western slope of the Andes. Almost all of these mammals are found a small (2 m) distance from tropical forest streams and rivers. They tend to prefer the moist habitats in forested areas such as swamps or marshes, and are sometimes found inhabiting caves

== Predation ==
The South American water rat has mainly one predator, the barn owl (Tyto alba). They are most vulnerable at night when the barn owls are hunting and the nocturnal rat is out of its nest. Nectomys squamipes are very good swimmers and climbers, which act as short-term defenses against predation. Their darkened dorsal pelage may also act as camouflage.

== Diet ==
Nectomys squamipes is an omnivorous mammal with a diet ranging from fruits and leaves to insects and small fish. The South American water rat tends to feed more often after the end of the wet season, when food is in abundance. Many newborn water rats will grow bigger during this time period, because they have access to more food than those born during drier periods.

== Life history and reproduction ==
The South American water rat is a polygynous mammal in which males will increase their home range in attempt to mate with many females to produce the most offspring possible. Although males tend to be sexually active all year long, seasonal breeding patterns are suggested since females have a higher pregnancy rate during the wet season, which is August to November in South America. This will produce offspring that have an abundant food source when born, resulting in greater growth and larger populations.

Gestation periods last around 30 days and young have an average body length between 10-11 grams, with litters as small as 1 offspring and as large as 7. Males are generally absent when raising the altricial young, so the female is responsible for feeding and caring for their young.

== Behavior ==
Nectomys squamipes is a solitary mammal that is active during the night. The males have a much less defined home range and tend to roam, while the females are very territorial.

When swimming and searching for food, the South American water rat is able to detect objects under water and lift them above the surface in order to inspect to see if the object is edible or not using olfaction and sight. When hunting on land it is able to secure prey but pouncing and grasping with its forepaws.

Nests are generally built that are similar to those of birds and consists of dry twigs and leaves woven together. They are built inside dead trees alongside streams and under dense vegetation for protection.

== Transmission of disease ==
Nectomys squamipes is commonly studied as a reservoir for the organism Schistosoma mansoni, which causes the disease Schistosomiasis. This disease is caused by parasitic worms found in freshwater, which may have been consumed by the South American water rat. Studies focus in endemic areas of Brazil that have large populations of N. squamipes, in attempt to find a correlation between the water rat and disease in residents of endemic areas. A great correlation between species presence and disease has been shown.
