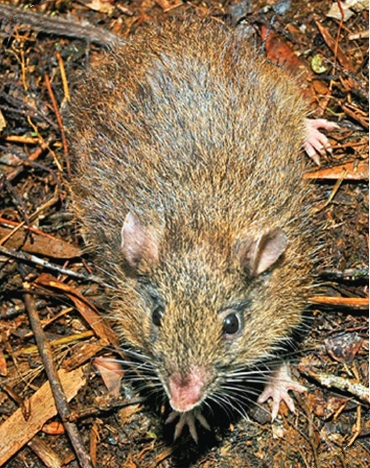

Conservation status
- Data Deficient (IUCN 3.1)

Scientific classification
- Kingdom: Animalia
- Phylum: Chordata
- Class: Mammalia
- Order: Rodentia
- Family: Muridae
- Genus: Batomys
- Species: B. hamiguitan

Binomial name
- Batomys hamiguitan Balete, Heaney, Rickart, Quidlat, & Ibanez, 2008
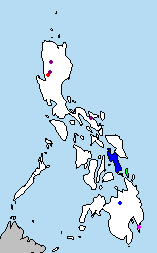

= Hamiguitan hairy-tailed rat =

Species of rodent

The Hamiguitan hairy-tailed rat (Batomys hamiguitan) is one of five species of rodent in the genus Batomys. It is in the diverse family Muridae. This species is found only in the Philippines. is a yellow-brown animal with a long furry tail, weighs about 175 grams (6.2 oz), and is related to several other species known in Central Mindanao, Dinagat Island and Luzon. It lives only in an area that's at least 950 metres (3,120 ft) high, and in dwarf mossy forests less than 10 square kilometres (3.9 sq mi).

It was the last member of its genus to be discovered in May 2006. According to team leader and lead author Danilo Balete, "Hamiguitan batomys is the first mammal to be described from Eastern Mindanao, and the first thought to live only in that area."

This species corroborates the hypothesis that the island of Mindanao has multiple centers of endemism, of which the southeastern highland of Mount Hamiguitan is one.
