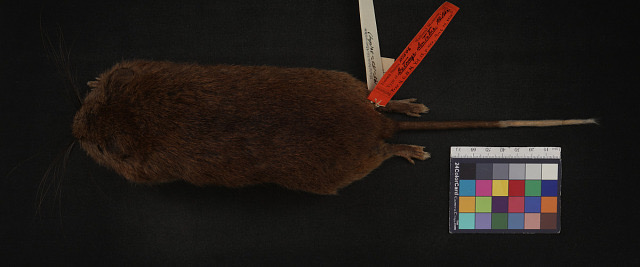
- A specimen of Batomys dentatus

Conservation status
- Data Deficient (IUCN 3.1)

Scientific classification
- Kingdom: Animalia
- Phylum: Chordata
- Class: Mammalia
- Order: Rodentia
- Family: Muridae
- Genus: Batomys
- Species: B. dentatus

Binomial name
- Batomys dentatus Miller, 1911
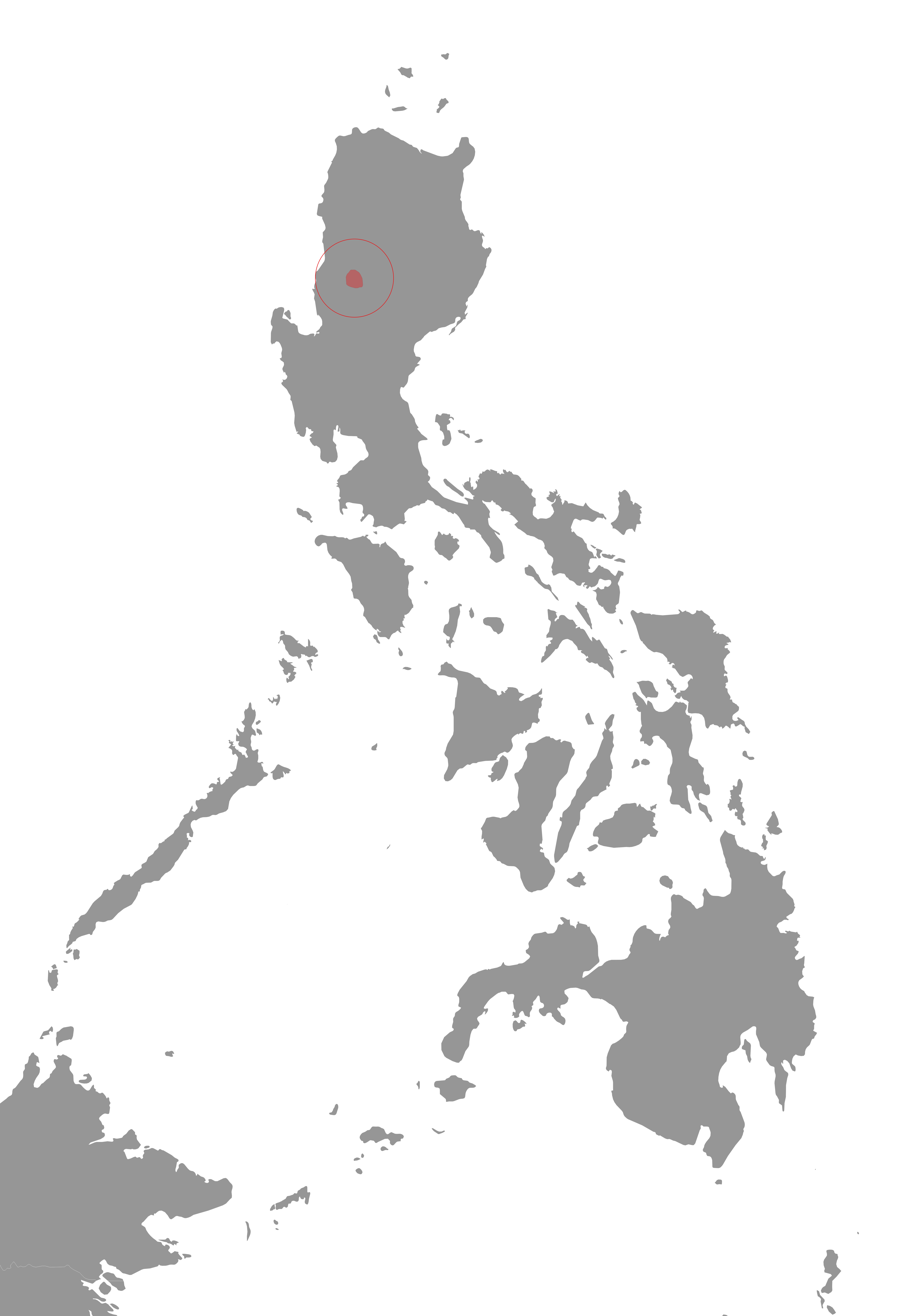

= Large-toothed hairy-tailed rat =

Species of rodent

The large-toothed hairy-tailed rat (Batomys dentatus) is one of five species of rodent in the genus Batomys. It is in the diverse family Muridae. This species is found only in Philippines. Its natural habitat is subtropical or tropical dry forests.
