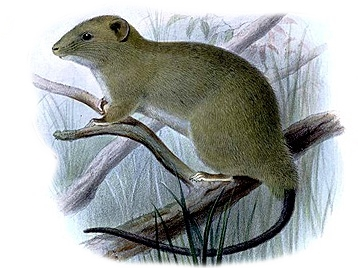

Conservation status
- Data Deficient (IUCN 3.1)

Scientific classification
- Kingdom: Animalia
- Phylum: Chordata
- Class: Mammalia
- Order: Rodentia
- Family: Muridae
- Genus: Carpomys
- Species: C. melanurus

Binomial name
- Carpomys melanurus Thomas, 1895
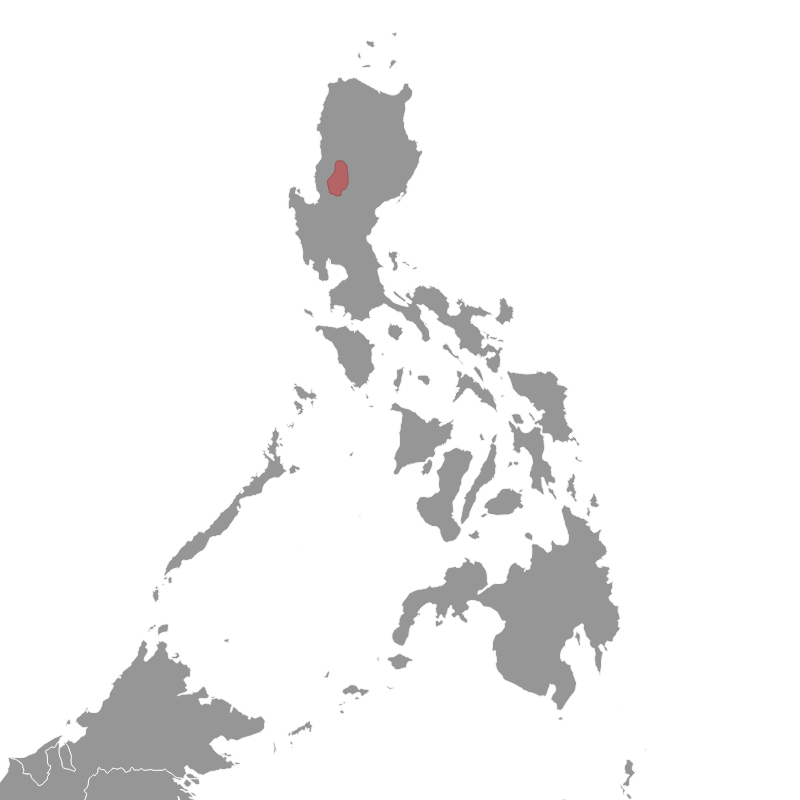

= Short-footed Luzon tree rat =

Species of rodent

The short-footed Luzon tree rat or greater dwarf cloud rat (Carpomys melanurus) is a species of rodent in the family Muridae. It is found only in the Philippines, specifically in northern Luzon. Its natural habitat is tropical moist montane forests. The type specimen was found on Mount Data, in an expedition by Whitehead. It was described by Oldfield Thomas in 1895.

== Description ==
Fur soft, thick, and woolly. General colour deep fulvous, coarsely lined with black. Under surface and inner sides of limbs dull yellowish white, the bases of the hairs slate. Ears of medium size, well haired, dark brown, nearly black. Limbs to wrists and ankles furred and coloured like body. Metapodials brown mesially, laterally and on the digits white. Tail longer than head and body, its basal inch or two thickly furry like the body, and of the same colour; the rest closely covered with shining black hairs, some 5 to 7 millimeters in length, entirely hiding the scales; not specially tufted at tip.

Skull with the nasals broad in front, abruptly narrowing backward. Interorbital region narrow, broader in front than behind, and the traces of ridges mounting on to the top, and approaching each other to within 2 millimeters in the middle line. Palatal foramina parallel-sided, attaining at once their greatest width anteriorly. Palate ending opposite the front edge of the second molar (M2).

Teeth broad and heavy. Incisors broad, slightly flattened in front in old specimens; dark yellow above, rather more whitish below. Molars very broad and large, their combined length exceeding that of the palatal foramina.

== Rediscovery ==
This species was long thought to be extinct. In 2008, Filipino researchers including Dr. Danilo Balete found a specimen in the canopy of Mount Pulag National Park, the first scientifically observed individual of the species since 1896. The captured individual was "about 185 grams and has dense soft reddish-brown fur, a black mask around large dark eyes, small rounded ears, a broad and blunt snout and a long tail covered with dark hair".
