= Fish-eating rat =

Fish-eating rat can refer to several related semiaquatic South American rodents of tribe Ichthyomyini:

- Anotomys, one species:
  - Ecuador fish-eating rat, fish-eating rat or aquatic rat (A. leander)
- Neusticomys, six species:
  - Ferreira's fish-eating rat (N. ferreirai)
  - Montane fish-eating rat (N. monticolus)
  - Musso's fish-eating rat (N. mussoi)
  - Oyapock's fish-eating rat (N. oyapocki)
  - Peruvian fish-eating rat (N. peruviensis)
  - Venezuelan fish-eating rat (N. venezuelae)
