= El Cajas National Park =

Protected area in Ecuador

- IUCN category II (national park)
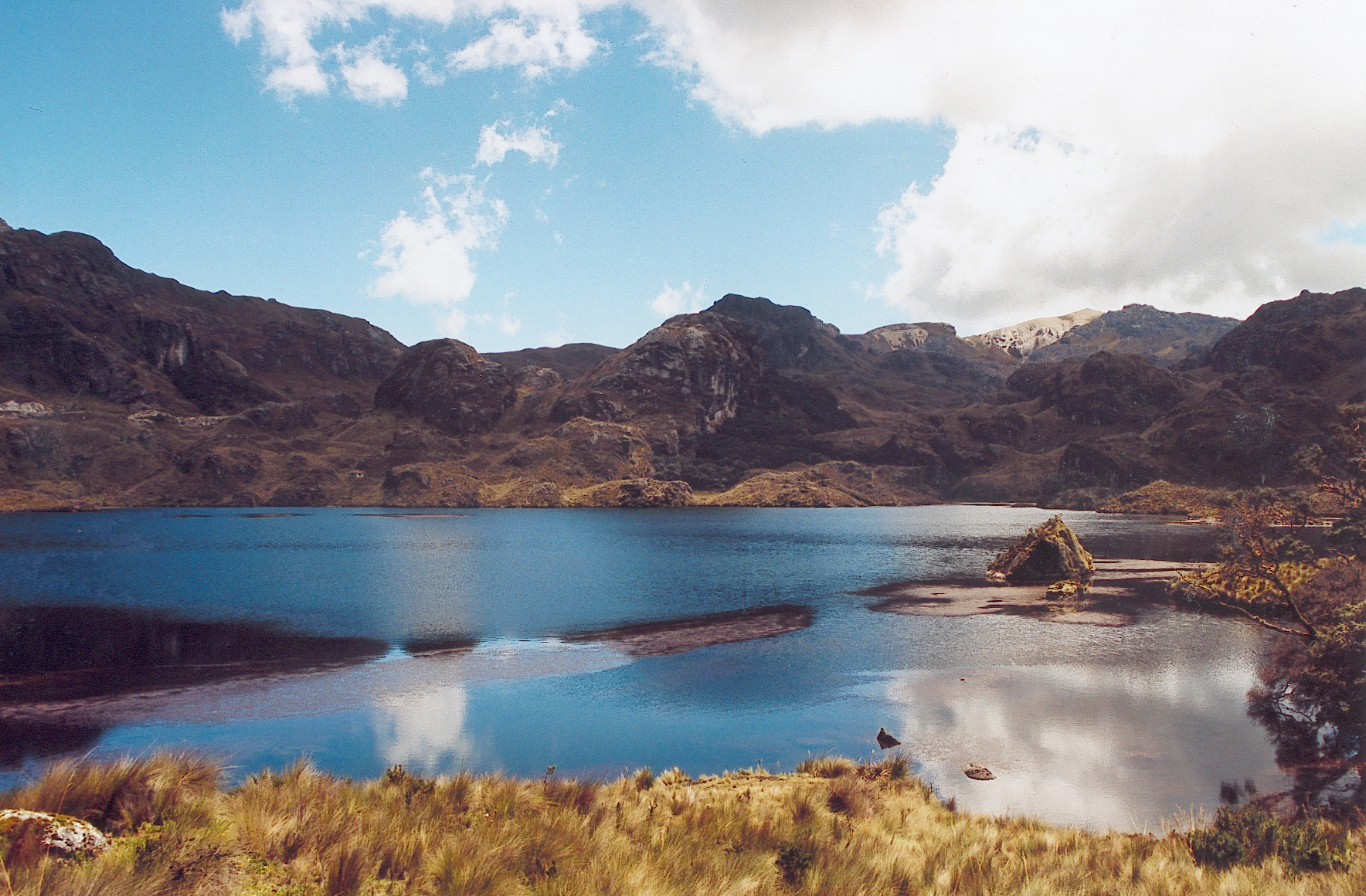
- A lagoon in Cajas National Park

- Location within Ecuador
- Location: Ecuador; Azuay Province
- Nearest city: Cuenca
- Coordinates: 02°50′46″S 79°13′13″W
- Area: 285.4 km^{2} (110.2 sq mi)
- Established: November 5, 1996 (Resolution N° 057)

Ramsar Wetland
- Official name: Parque Nacional Cajas
- Designated: 14 August 2002
- Reference no.: 1203

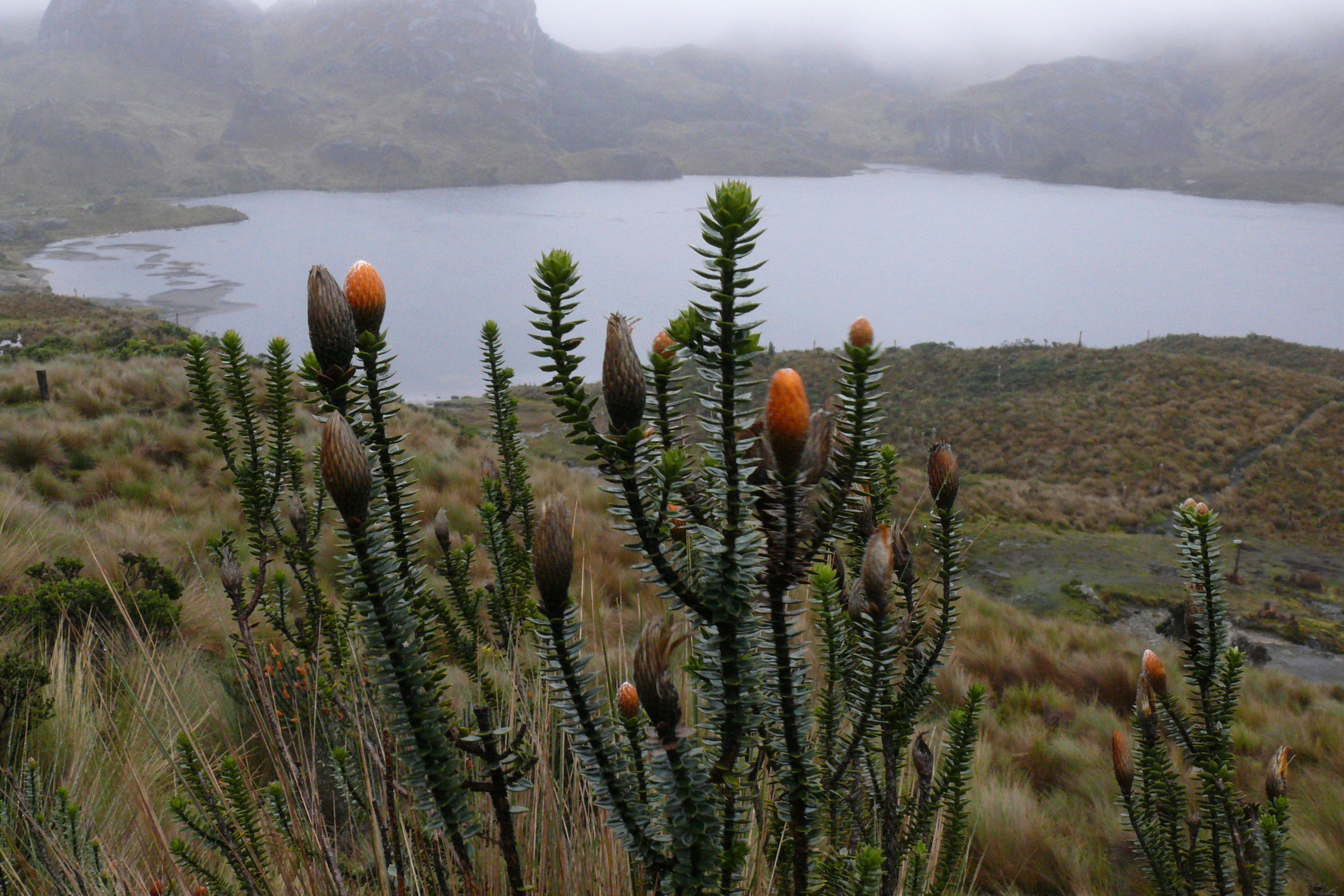
Chuquiraga jussieui growing near a lake in the park.

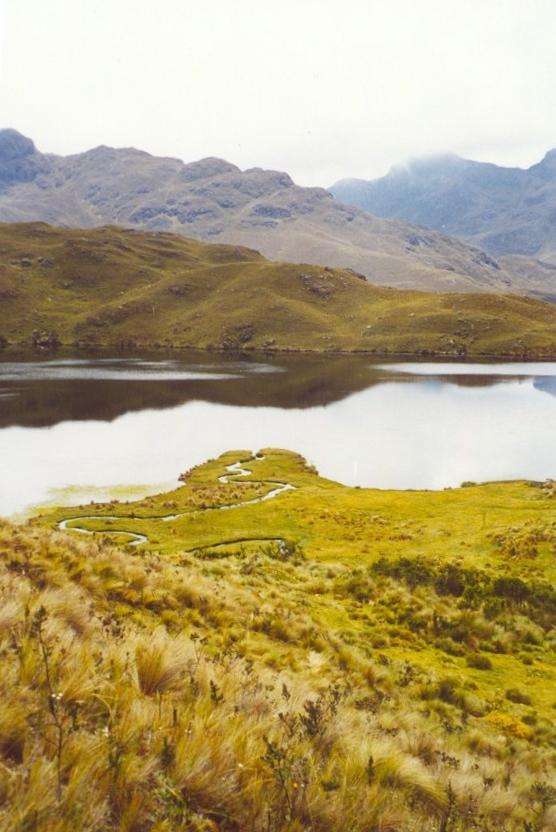
A lake in El Cajas.

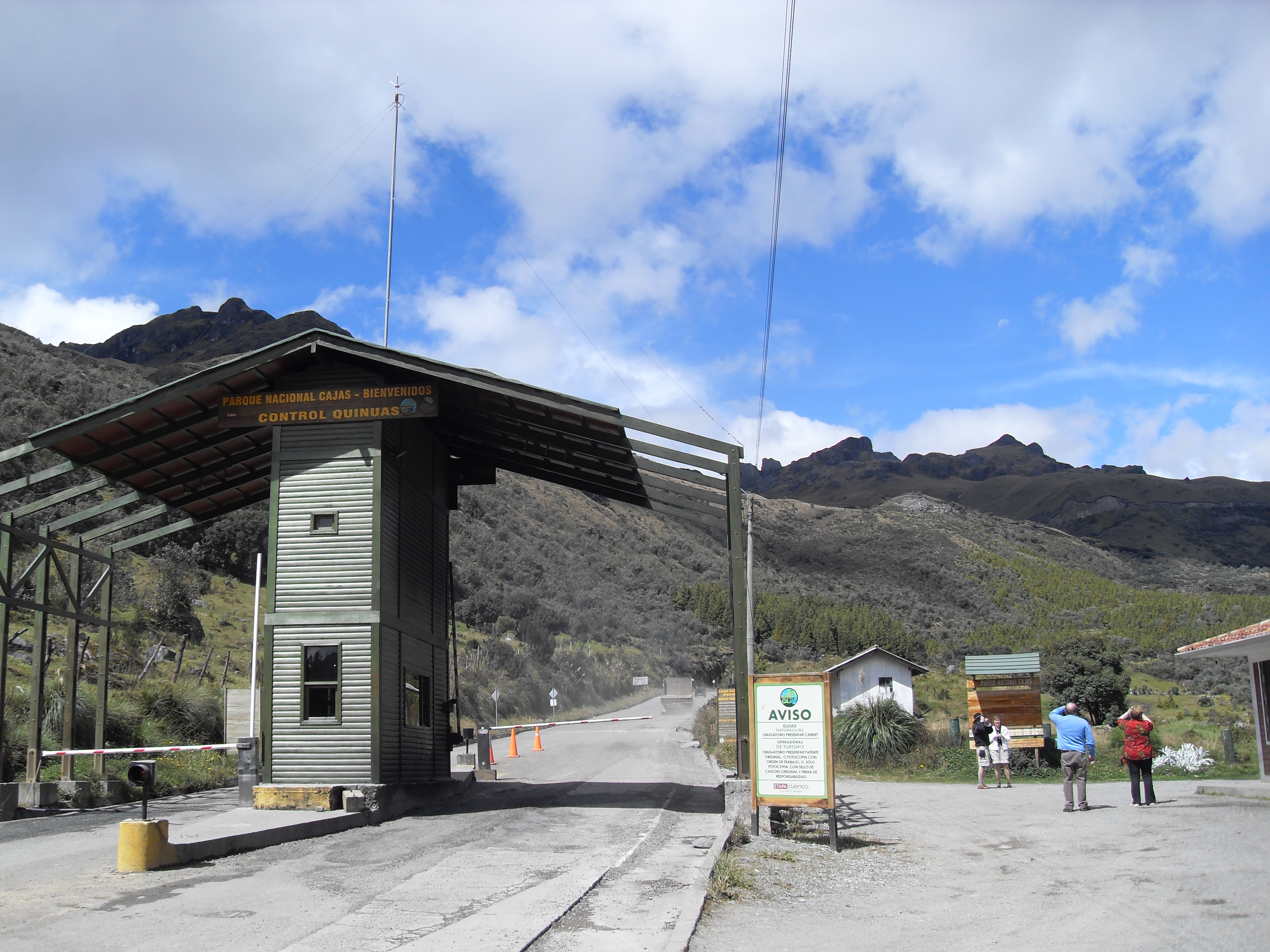
Park entrance.

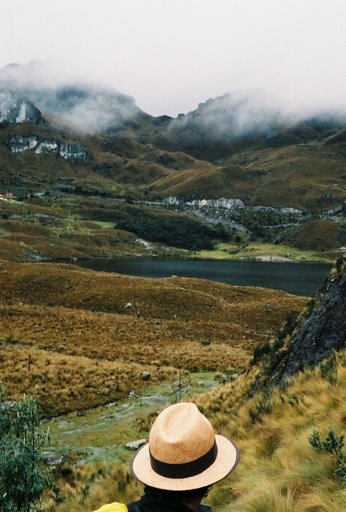
Low clouds.

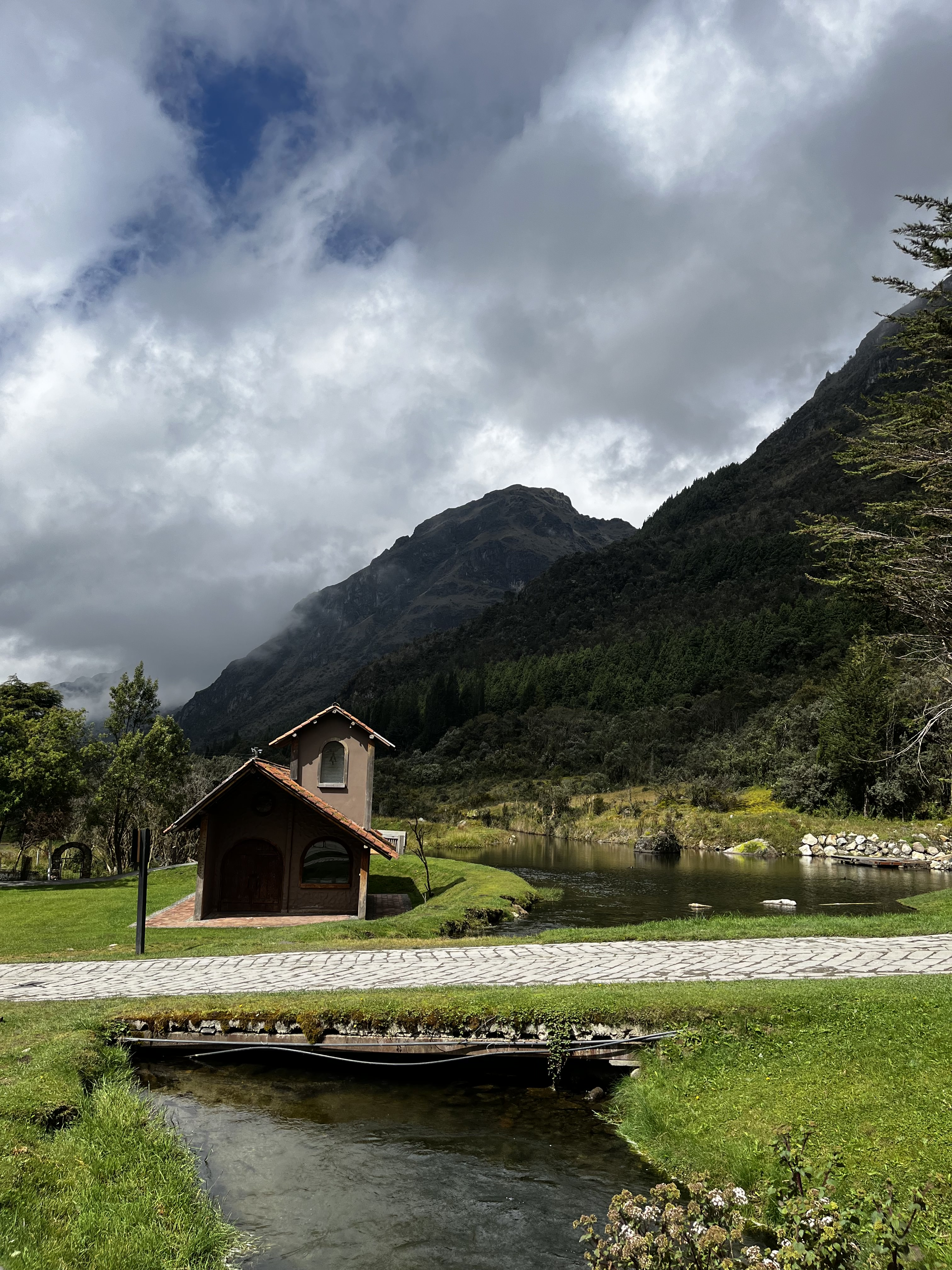
Scenic view within the park

El Cajas National Park or Cajas National Park (Spanish: Parque Nacional El Cajas) is a national park in the highlands of Ecuador. It is located about 30 km west from Cuenca, the capital of the province of Azuay. The area of 285.44 km^{2} (28,544 ha) between 3100m and 4450m above sea level is characterized by páramo vegetation on a jagged landscape of hills and valleys. It was declared a National Park on November 5, 1996 by resolution N° 057. It is one of 759 UNESCO-designated biosphere reserves in 136 countries.

== Name ==
The name "Cajas" is derived from the Quichua word "cassa" meaning "gateway to the snowy mountains". or "caxa" (Quichua:cold). It has also been linked to the Spanish word "cajas" (boxes).

== Geography and climate ==
The highest point is the 4,450 m high Cerro Arquitectos (Architects Hill), and the elevation of roads reaches higher than 4,310 meters (13,550 feet). About 270 lakes and lagoons are present in the páramo of Cajas. Luspa is the largest of these lake and extends over 78 hectares with a maximum depth of 68 m at a perimeter of 5,161 m. Like the other lakes it is of glacial origin, and glaciation shaped the landscape of Cajas leaving U-shaped valleys and ravines. Cajas provides about 60% of the drinking water for the Cuenca area. Two of the four rivers of Cuenca originate from Cajas, the Tomebamba and Yanuncay rivers which eventually drain into the Amazon River. The Paute river also links to the Amazon. As the park straddles the continental divide, its western drainage, the Balao and Cañar link to the Pacific ocean. The modern road crosses the continental divide at the pass "Tres Cruces" (4,255 m). This section is the most western part of the continental divide of South America.

The climate shows an average temperature of 13.2 °C and an average annual precipitation of 1,072 mm. Clouds typically drift up from the Pacific coast and from the Paute river basin (near Cuenca) and bring humidity. It is estimated that the bodies of water in the PNC were formed around 10,000 years ago.

== Ecology ==
=== Flora ===
Humidity and high altitude with low atmospheric pressure create an ecosystem that accumulates organic material in the soil that is able to retain water. The high grassland ecosystem (páramo) contains plants suitably adapted to it, 19 of them endemic to Cajas. The dominant plant is straw grass (Calamagrostis intermedia).

Above 3,300 meters the "queñua" or "paper tree" (Polylepis) forest is found. It is in forests such as these that a second protected population of the rare Fuchsia campii, in the family Onagraceae, is predicted to live, as it has also been found in another nearby national park of similar ecological characteristics.

In the lower parts of the park, the cloud forest and perennial high mountain forest are present, primarily in the ravines near the brooks and rivers.

=== Fauna ===
The Cajas National Park is home to a large variety of animals, some of which are endemic or highly endangered. Among the most prominent are the South American condor, of which only 80 remain throughout all Ecuador; the curiquinga, a large black and white raptor, and the largest hummingbird of the world, the giant hummingbird (Patagona gigas), which lives only on agave flowers. The violet-throated metaltail (Metalura gorjivioleta) is endemic to Cajas and surrounding valleys. The avifauna consists of 157 bird species, making birdwatching an alluring activity for visitors.

Overall, forty-four mammalian species have been identified in the park. Species include types of opossums, cats, and bats. Also there are pumas, coatis, weasels, skunks, foxes, porcupines, pacas, shrews, rabbits and other rodents. Endemic are the Cajas water mouse (Chibchanomys orcesi) that belongs to the group Ichthyomyini and Tate's shrew opossum (Caenolestes tatei).

At least seventeen species of amphibians live around the lagoons of Cajas. This includes those of the genera Atelopus, Telmatobius, Gastrotheca, Eleutherodactylus, and Colostethus. The high variety of amphibians suggests the presence of a diversity of insects, as they are a chief amphibian food source. Many of these endemic frog species are critically endangered due to the spread of the parasitic fungus Batrachochytrium dendrobatidis (BD); Including Atelopus nanay, Atelopus balios, and Atelopus bomolochos.

== Archeology ==
The area shows evidence of human activities already from the Cañari period. This includes three interregional roads connecting Guapondelig (later Tomebamba, today Cuenca) with the lowlands including Paredones, a control point for the trade between the highlands and the coastal areas. After the Incan invasion Inca roads were constructed, incorporating preexisting roads. Twenty-eight archeological sites have been identified in the park and its vicinity that indicate inhabitation during the pre-Incan and Incan periods. During the Colonial time the vicinity of the area was used for livestock. With the creation of the park the area has become popular for hiking, climbing, camping, fishing, and birdwatching. Control points are located at the road entries to the park. The park has a refuge hut and can be reached from Cuenca and Guayaquil. A road from Chaucha to San Joaquin touches on the southern border of the park providing access.

== International listings ==
Cajas is listed as a Ramsar Wetland of International Importance. It is also categorized as an Important Bird Area. Currently it is a candidate for World Natural Heritage Site by UNESCO.

== See also ==
- Pristimantis erythros
