= Laelaps manguinhosi =

Scientific classification
- Domain: Eukaryota
- Kingdom: Animalia
- Phylum: Arthropoda
- Subphylum: Chelicerata
- Class: Arachnida
- Order: Mesostigmata
- Family: Laelapidae
- Genus: Laelaps
- Species: L. manguinhosi

Binomial name
- Laelaps manguinhosi Fonseca, 1936 (Note: As given by Furman (1972, p. 23) and Whitaker and Wilson (1974, p. 10). Nava et al. (2003, p. 2) give 1935.)

Synonyms
- Laelaps oryzomydis Pratt and Lane, 1953

Species of mite

Laelaps manguinhosi is a species of parasitic mite in the family Laelapidae. In the United States, it has been found on the marsh rice rat (Oryzomys palustris) in Florida, Texas, and South Carolina. Other recorded hosts include the sigmodontine rodents Scapteromys aquaticus, Akodon azarae, Oligoryzomys flavescens, and Holochilus brasiliensis in Argentina and Oryzomys couesi and Handleyomys melanotis in Mexico. In Venezuela, it mainly infects the oryzomyines Holochilus sciureus and Nectomys, but it has also been recorded on a variety of other mammals and even on a bird. A separate subspecies, Laelaps manguinhosi calvescens, has been described from the ichthyomyine rodent Neusticomys venezuelae.

== See also ==
- List of parasites of the marsh rice rat

== Literature cited ==
- Estébanes-González, M.L., Sánchez-Hernández, C., Romero-Almaraz, M. de L. and Schnell, G.D. 2011. Ácaros parásitos de roedores de Playa de Oro, Colima, México. Acta Zoológica Mexicana 27(1):169–176 (in Spanish).
- Furman, D.P. 1972. Laelapid mites (Laelapidae: Laelapinae) from Venezuela (PDF). Brigham Young University Science Bulletin 17(3):1–58.
- Nava, S., Lareschi, M. and Voglino, D. 2003. Interrelationship between ectoparasites and wild rodents from northeastern Buenos Aires Province, Argentina (PDF). Memórias do Instituto Oswaldo Cruz 98(1):45–49.
- Whitaker, J.O. and Wilson, N. 1974. Host and distribution lists of mites (Acari), parasitic and phoretic, in the hair of wild mammals of North America, north of Mexico (subscription required). American Midland Naturalist 91(1):1–67.
