= Pine's crab-eating rat =

Scientific classification
- Kingdom: Animalia
- Phylum: Chordata
- Class: Mammalia
- Order: Rodentia
- Family: Cricetidae
- Subfamily: Sigmodontinae
- Genus: Ichthyomys
- Species: I. pinei

Binomial name
- Ichthyomys pinei Fernández de Córdova, Nivelo-Villavicencio, Reyes-Puig, Pardiñas, & J. Brito, 2020

Species of rat

Pine's crab-eating rat (Ichthyomys pinei) is a species of ichthyomine rat belonging to the subfamily Sigmodontinae. It is native to southern Ecuador.

The species was named in honor of Ronald H. Pine who has been involved with numerous vertebrate surveys on variouse continents and who has been involved with studying bats, rodents and marsupials in Latin America.

== Description ==
It is a small species with a body plus head length of around 13 cm (5.1 in). The upper part of the body is a rusty brown color. The underside of the body is white with some amount of grey. Its fur is soft, dense and woolly. The tail is sharply bicolor with it being brown above and whitish below. The tail is slightly longer than the head and body length. The scalation of the tail is covered by dense hairs. The length of the hindfoot including the claw is less than 35 mm (1.4 in). The ventral surface of the hindfoot is dark brown.

Based on the stomach contents of the holotype and paratype specimens, the diet of this species includes larval insects of the order Trichoptera.

== Conservation ==
While there is not enough data to determine the conservation status of this species, the location where the type specimens were discovered are near gold mining projects. This could threaten its habitat through deforestation and water pollution.
