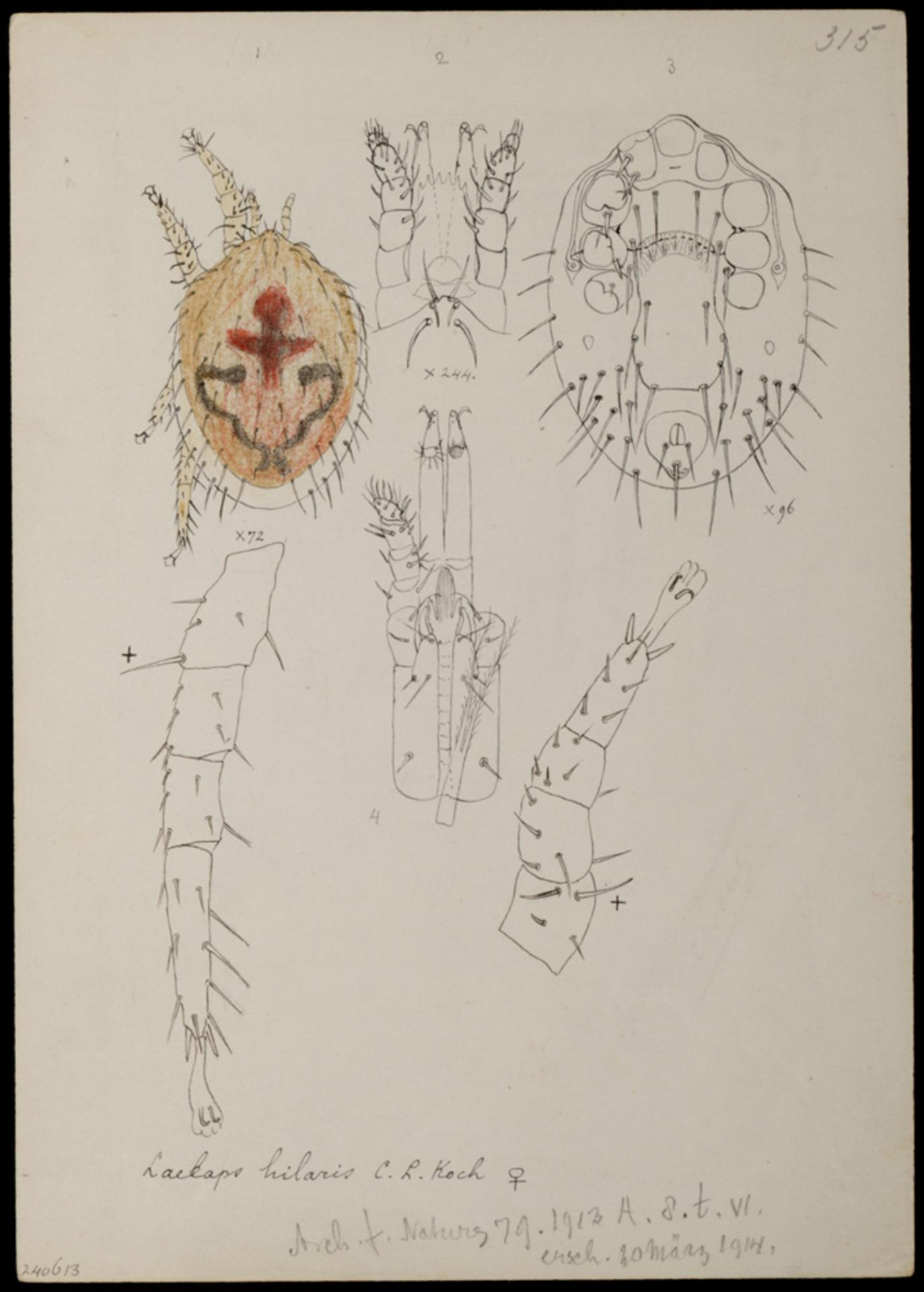
- Laelaps hilaris drawn by Oudemans

Scientific classification
- Kingdom: Animalia
- Phylum: Arthropoda
- Subphylum: Chelicerata
- Class: Arachnida
- Order: Mesostigmata
- Family: Laelapidae
- Genus: Laelaps; Koch, 1836

Type species
- Laelaps agilis Koch, 1836

Species
- See text

= Laelaps (mite) =

Genus of mites

Laelaps is a genus of common parasitic mites in the family Laelapidae. Species, with their hosts, include:

- Laelaps acuminata – Oecomys
- Laelaps agilis – Rattus
- Laelaps alaskensis – Blarina, Clethrionomys, Craseomys, Dicrostonyx, Lemmiscus, Lemmus, Microtus, Mustela, Myotis, Napaeozapus, Ochrotomys, Ondatra, Onychomys, Parascalops, Peromyscus, Phenacomys, Poliocitellus, Sorex, Synaptomys, Thomomys
- Laelaps boultoni – Neacomys, Sigmodon, Oligoryzomys, Oecomys, Heteromys
- Laelaps castroi – Oligoryzomys
- Laelaps clethrionomydis – Clethrionomys, Craseomys, Microtus,
- Laelaps conula – Rhipidomys
- Laelaps crinigera – Oryzomyini
- Laelaps dearmasi – Zygodontomys
- Laelaps differens
- Laelaps echidnina – Rattus, Didelphis, Sigmodon, Mus, Peromyscus, Sylvilagus
- Laelaps evansi – Neofiber
- Laelaps exceptionalis – "wild rat"
- Laelaps flexa – Microryzomys
- Laelaps giganteus (Berlese, 1918) – Lemniscomys
- Laelaps incilis – Microtus, Neotamias, Peromyscus
- Laelaps kochi – Blarina, Clethrionomys, Corynorhinus, Craseomys, Dicrostonyx, Dipodomys, Glaucomys, Microtus, Mustela, Napaeozapus, Neotamias, Neovison, Neurotrichus, Ondatra, Peromyscus, Phenacomys, Sigmodon, Sorex, Synaptomys, Tamias, Zapus
- Laelaps lavieri – Mus
- Laelaps lemmi – Lemmus
- Laelaps liberiensis – Mastomys
- Laelaps manguinhosi – Holochilus, Nectomys, Neusticomys, and various other mammals
- Laelaps mazzai – Calomys, Oligoryzomys
- Laelaps multispinosa – Castor, Didelphis, Microtus, Mustela, Neovison, Ondatra, Peromyscus, Procyon
- Laelaps muricola – Mastomys
- Laelaps muris – Microtus, Ondatra
- Laelaps navasi – Oryzomyini
- Laelaps nuttalli – Mus, Ochrotomys, Peromyscus, Rattus, Sciurus
- Laelaps ovata – Nephelomys
- Laelaps paulistanensis – Rhipidomys, Oryzomyini
- Laelaps pilifer – Oryzomyini
- Laelaps spicata – Oryzomyini
- Laelaps stupkai – Synaptomys
- Laelaps surcomata – Rhipidomys
- Laelaps thori

Unnamed or unidentified species have been reported on Gerbilliscus robustus and Acomys wilsoni in Tanzania and on the marsh rice rat (Oryzomys palustris) in Florida and Georgia.

== Literature cited ==
- Furman, D.P. (1972). "Laelapid mites (Laelapidae: Laelapinae) from Venezuela". Brigham Young University Science Bulletin 17(3):1–58.
- Matthee, Sonja; Horak, Ivan G.; Beaucournu, Jean-Claude; Durden, Lance A.; Ueckermann, Eddie A.; McGeoch, Melodie A. (February 2007). "Epifaunistic arthropod parasites of the four-striped mouse, Rhabdomys pumilio, in the Western Cape Province, South Africa" (PDF). Journal of Parasitology. 93 (1): 47–59. doi:10.1645/GE-819R2.1. hdl:10019.1/117482. PMID 17436941. Archived from the original on 22 December 2023.
- Morlan, Harvey B. (1952). "Host Relationships and Seasonal Abundance of Some Southwest Georgia Southwest Georgia Ectoparasites". The American Midland Naturalist. 48 (1): 74–93. doi:10.2307/2422133. JSTOR 2422133.
- Nazarizadeh, Masoud; Martinů, Jana; Nováková, Milena; Stanko, Michal; Štefka, Jan (December 2022). "Phylogeography of the parasitic mite Laelaps agilis in Western Palearctic shows lineages lacking host specificity but possessing different demographic histories". BMC Zoology. 7 (1): 15. doi:10.1186/s40850-022-00115-y. PMC 10127304. PMID 37170127. "The main lineages of L. muricola and L. giganteus diverged from L. agilis and L. clethrionomydis ..."
- Stanley, W.T., Rogers, M.A., Senzota, R.B.M., Mturi, F.A., Kihaule, P.M., Moehlman, P.D. and O'Connor, B.M. (2007). "Surveys of small mammals in Tarangire National Park, Tanzania". Journal of East African Natural History 96(1):47–71.
- Strandtman, R. W.; Mitchell, Carl J. (15 October 1963). "The Laelaptine Mites of the Echinolaelaps Complex from the Southwest Pacific Area" (PDF). Pacific Insects. 5 (3): 541–576. Archived from the original (PDF) on 21 June 2022.
- Whitaker, John O.; Wilson, Nixon (1974). "Host and Distribution Lists of Mites (Acari), Parasitic and Phoretic, in the Hair of Wild Mammals of North America, North of Mexico". The American Midland Naturalist. 91 (1): 1–67. doi:10.2307/2424511. JSTOR 2424511.
- Whitaker, J.O., Walters, B.L., Castor, L.K., Ritzi, C.M. and Wilson, N. (2007). "Host and distribution lists of mites (Acari), parasitic and phoretic, in the hair or on the skin of North American wild mammals north of Mexico: records since 1974". Faculty Publications from the Harold W. Manter Laboratory of Parasitology, University of Nebraska, Lincoln 1:1–173.
- Worth, C. Brooke (1950). "Observations on Ectoparasites of Some Small Mammals in Everglades National Park and Hillsborough County, Florida". The Journal of Parasitology. 36 (4): 326–335. doi:10.2307/3273467. JSTOR 3273467. PMID 15437232.
- Zumpt, F.; Till, W. M. (November 1958). "Notes on the classification and synonymy of gamasid mites parasitic on vertebrates (Acarina: Mesostigmata)". Journal of the Entomological Society of Southern Africa. 21 (2). hdl:10520/AJA00128789_2505.
