= Musso's fish-eating rat =

Conservation status
- Vulnerable (IUCN 3.1)

Scientific classification
- Kingdom: Animalia
- Phylum: Chordata
- Class: Mammalia
- Order: Rodentia
- Family: Cricetidae
- Subfamily: Sigmodontinae
- Genus: Daptomys
- Species: D. mussoi

Binomial name
- Daptomys mussoi (Ochoa G. & Soriano, 1991)

Species of rodent

Musso's fish-eating rat (Daptomys mussoi) is a species of rodent in the family Cricetidae endemic to western Venezuela, where it has been found at altitudes of 1,000 to 1,200 m (3,280 to 3,940 ft). It is semiaquatic and feeds on freshwater invertebrates. This species was originally assigned to the genus Neusticomys, but it has been moved to Daptomys along with four other species.
