= Las Cajas water mouse =

Conservation status
- Data Deficient (IUCN 3.1)

Scientific classification
- Kingdom: Animalia
- Phylum: Chordata
- Class: Mammalia
- Order: Rodentia
- Family: Cricetidae
- Subfamily: Sigmodontinae
- Genus: Neusticomys
- Species: N. orcesi

Binomial name
- Neusticomys orcesi (Jenkins & Barnett, 1997)

Species of rodent

The Las Cajas water mouse (Neusticomys orcesi) is a species of rodent in the family Cricetidae. It is endemic to the Cajas National Park in Ecuador. Its natural habitat is the high grassland (páramo) of the park, where it lives near streams, eating small fish and large invertebrates. It was formerly placed in the genus Chibchanomys, but was moved to Neusticomys in 2023.
