= Oyapock's fish-eating rat =

Conservation status
- Data Deficient (IUCN 3.1)

Scientific classification
- Kingdom: Animalia
- Phylum: Chordata
- Class: Mammalia
- Order: Rodentia
- Family: Cricetidae
- Subfamily: Sigmodontinae
- Genus: Daptomys
- Species: D. oyapocki

Binomial name
- Daptomys oyapocki Dubost & Petter, 1978

Species of rodent

Oyapock's fish-eating rat (Daptomys oyapocki) is a species of rodent in the family Cricetidae. It is found in French Guiana and Brazil. For a time, this species was assigned to the genus Neusticomys, but it has since been returned to its original genus.
