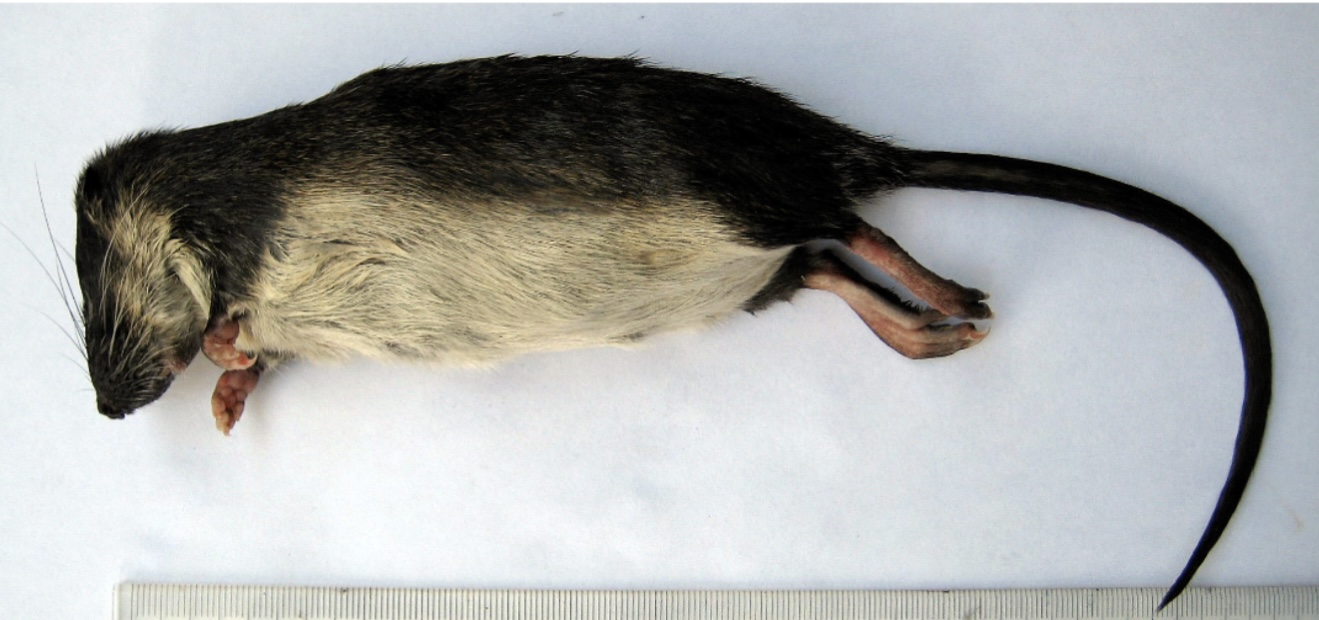

Conservation status
- Data Deficient (IUCN 3.1)

Scientific classification
- Kingdom: Animalia
- Phylum: Chordata
- Class: Mammalia
- Order: Rodentia
- Family: Cricetidae
- Subfamily: Sigmodontinae
- Genus: Ichthyomys
- Species: I. tweedii

Binomial name
- Ichthyomys tweedii Anthony, 1921

= Tweedy's crab-eating rat =

Species of rodent

Tweedy's crab-eating rat (Ichthyomys tweedii) is a species of rodent in the family Cricetidae. It is found in two disjointed regions in western Ecuador and central Panama. The species is found near fast-flowing streams in primary and secondary forest, and is known from elevations of 900 to 1700 m. It is presumed that like other members of its genus, it nocturnal and semiaquatic, and feeds on freshwater invertebrates, such as crabs. This rodent is threatened by habitat destruction and water pollution.
