= Calamagrostis intermedia =

Scientific classification
- Kingdom: Plantae
- Clade: Tracheophytes
- Clade: Angiosperms
- Clade: Monocots
- Clade: Commelinids
- Order: Poales
- Family: Poaceae
- Subfamily: Pooideae
- Genus: Calamagrostis
- Species: C. intermedia

Binomial name
- Calamagrostis intermedia (J. Presl) Steud.

Synonyms
- Calamagrostis agapatea Steud.; Calamagrostis secunda (Pilg.) Pilg.; Deyeuxia intermedia J.Presl; Deyeuxia secunda Pilg.

Species of grass

Calamagrostis intermedia is a species of grass in the family Poaceae. It is native to South America, growing in high elevation grasslands and forest clearings. Its range extends from Colombia to Argentina.

== Description ==
Calamagrostis intermedia is a perennial grass growing from a short, rounded rhizome. It grows in tussocks and can reach a height of 80 cm (30 in). There are no stipules; the leaves are upright, linear, with entire edges and incurved margins, giving a wiry, cylindrical effect. The inflorescence is a lax, terminal panicle up to 90 cm (35 in) tall, only just longer than the leaves. The flowers are bisexual with purple spikelets, densely pubescent and narrowly fusiform.

== Distribution ==
This species is native to South America where it occurs in the foothills and high elevation grasslands of the Andes and other mountain ranges. It is the dominant plant in the grassy páramo in the El Cajas National Park in Ecuador. It also occurs in forest clearings and where the ground has been disturbed.

== Ecology ==
Previously a largely uninhabited wilderness, the páramo grasslands are coming under increased pressure from the grazing of cattle, as human populations expand from lower elevations and use is made of the high elevation grassland. Fire is often used to encourage the growth of young succulent grass shoots. C. intermedia can survive the fires, resprouting from the base, but some flowering plants are killed by fire. Overgrazing and damage to the soil caused by the feet of the cattle also adversely affect the natural vegetation and reduces biodiversity.

== Uses ==
This grass is known locally as "paja" or "paja chamik" and is used as fodder for livestock. It is also cut and used for the construction of huts, roofs and baskets.
