= Peruvian fish-eating rat =

Conservation status
- Least Concern (IUCN 3.1)

Scientific classification
- Kingdom: Animalia
- Phylum: Chordata
- Class: Mammalia
- Order: Rodentia
- Family: Cricetidae
- Subfamily: Sigmodontinae
- Genus: Daptomys
- Species: D. peruviensis

Binomial name
- Daptomys peruviensis Musser & A.L. Gardner, 1974

Species of rodent

The Peruvian fish-eating rat (Daptomys peruviensis) is a species of semiaquatic rodent in the family Cricetidae. It is found only in eastern Peru, where it is known from locations at elevations from 200 to 400 m. For a time, this species was assigned to the genus Neusticomys, but it has since been returned to its original genus.
