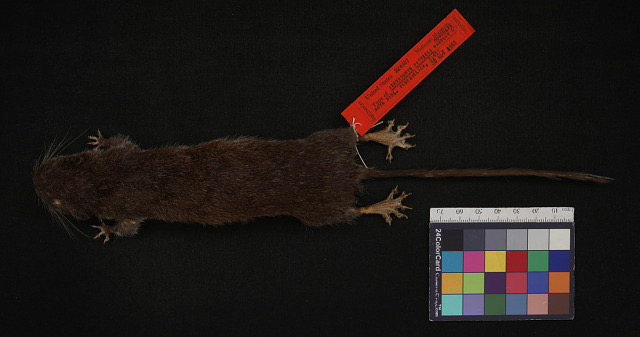

Conservation status
- Near Threatened (IUCN 3.1)

Scientific classification
- Kingdom: Animalia
- Phylum: Chordata
- Class: Mammalia
- Order: Rodentia
- Family: Cricetidae
- Subfamily: Sigmodontinae
- Genus: Ichthyomys
- Species: I. pittieri

Binomial name
- Ichthyomys pittieri Handley & Mondolfi, 1963

= Pittier's crab-eating rat =

Species of rodent

Pittier's crab-eating rat (Ichthyomys pittieri) is a species of semiaquatic rodent in the family Cricetidae. It is endemic to Venezuela. The natural habitats of this species are rivers and swamps. Its karyotype has 2n = 92 and FNa = 98. This was previously thought to be the highest chromosome number known for a mammal, but it has since been found that the plains viscacha rat or red viscacha rat (Tympanoctomys barrerae) has 4x = 2n = 102.
