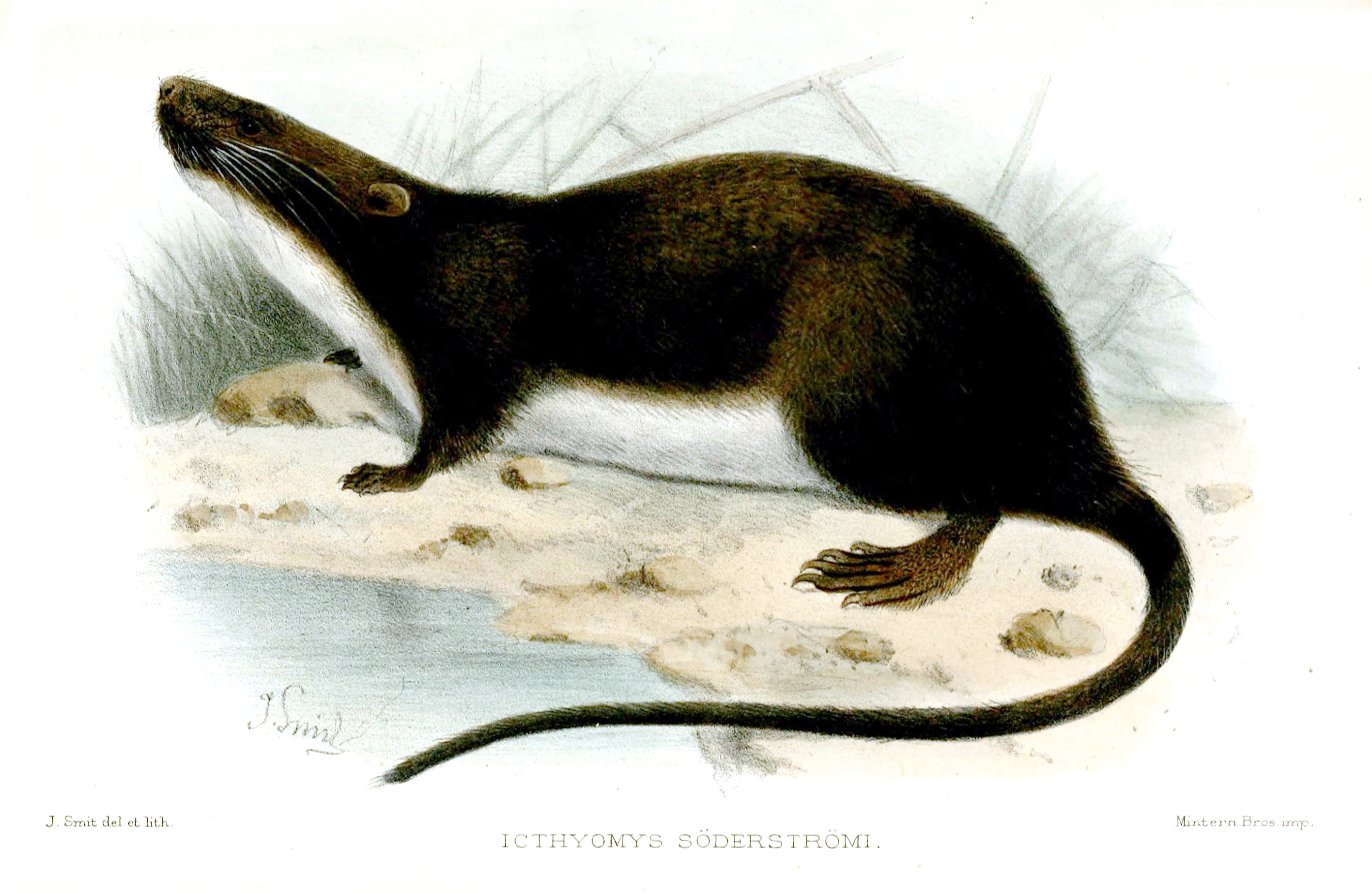

Conservation status
- Least Concern (IUCN 3.1)

Scientific classification
- Kingdom: Animalia
- Phylum: Chordata
- Class: Mammalia
- Order: Rodentia
- Family: Cricetidae
- Subfamily: Sigmodontinae
- Genus: Ichthyomys
- Species: I. hydrobates

Binomial name
- Ichthyomys hydrobates (Winge, 1891)

= Crab-eating rat =

Species of rodent

The crab-eating rat (Ichthyomys hydrobates) is a species of semiaquatic rodent in the family Cricetidae. It is native to Colombia, Ecuador, and Venezuela. Its lives near areas of rivers and swamps.

== Distribution ==
This species is distributed across the Andes mountains of western Venezuela, Colombia and northern Ecuador. It occurs in elevations between 1000-2800 meters. It lives in mountainous regions with clouded forests near areas with rivers, streams and swamps.

== Conservation ==
While they have been classified as least concerned by the IUCN red list, their population of the crab-eating rat is decreasing due to habitat loss from deforestation, agriculture and aquaculture and from pollution of water.
