= Ferreira's fish-eating rat =

Conservation status
- Data Deficient (IUCN 3.1)

Scientific classification
- Kingdom: Animalia
- Phylum: Chordata
- Class: Mammalia
- Order: Rodentia
- Family: Cricetidae
- Subfamily: Sigmodontinae
- Genus: Daptomys
- Species: D. ferreirai

Binomial name
- Daptomys ferreirai (Percequillo, Carmignotto, & Silva, 2005)

Species of rodent

Ferreira's fish-eating rat (Daptomys ferreirai) is a species of rodent in the family Cricetidae. It is known only from primary lowland tropical rainforest. It is named after 18th-century Brazilian naturalist Alexandre Rodrigues Ferreira. This species was originally assigned to the genus Neusticomys, but it has been moved to Daptomys along with four other species.
