= Aquatic rat =

Conservation status
- Endangered (IUCN 3.1)

Scientific classification
- Kingdom: Animalia
- Phylum: Chordata
- Class: Mammalia
- Order: Rodentia
- Family: Cricetidae
- Subfamily: Sigmodontinae
- Tribe: Ichthyomyini
- Subtribe: Anotomyina; Salazar-Bravo et al, 2023
- Genus: Anotomys; Thomas, 1906
- Species: A. leander

Binomial name
- Anotomys leander Thomas, 1906

Species of rodent

The aquatic rat, Ecuador fish-eating rat, fish-eating rat or Ecuadoran ichthyomyine (Anotomys leander) is a South American species of semiaquatic rodent in the family Cricetidae. It is the only species in the genus Anotomys. This species is currently considered endangered. It is thought to be nocturnal and feeds on aquatic arthropods and insects. It is found in small ranges along the Andes.

== Taxonomy ==
Anotomys leander is the only member of its genus, which belongs the tribe Ichthyomyini, subfamily Sigmodontinae and family Cricetidae. The ichthyomyines are semiaquatic carnivorous rodents that are found in the Americas from Mexico to Peru.

== Habitat ==
A. leander has a very small range, the smallest range of the ichthyomyines. Very few specimens have been captured so the full extent of its habitat and range is not completely known; the range is estimated at 40 km^{2} (15 mi^{2}). The species is found in northern Ecuador along the Andes mountains; however, it has also been found at a single locality in Colombia. Individuals have only been found at elevations of 2,800 to 4,000 m (9,200 to 13,100 ft). Their habitat is primarily wetlands that have streams, but also includes grassy paramo and mossy elfin forest edge. Every known specimen has been found near running water.

== Biology ==
The aquatic rat possess several distinctive characteristics, many of which can also be found in closely related ichthyomyines. The length of the tail is greater than the length of the body, and they have very large hind feet. They also have reduced or absent pinnae covered by a tuft of white fur. These characteristics are believed to aid in aquatic hunting and movement. For hunting the rodents rely on their vibrissae (whiskers) to help locate prey along the streams edge. The vibrissae contain a very sensitive and developed trigeminal nerve that runs along the infraorbital foramen.

=== Diet ===
The diet of this species is not completely known. It is believed to feed on small aquatic arthropods and larvae. A close relative from genus Chibchanomys, also an aquatic ichthyomyine, was found to feed on small fish, arthropods, as well as terrestrial and aquatic insects. This genus hunts along the edge of streams using their vibrissae and once prey is caught the rodent takes it to a safe place (sometimes a burrow) on land to eat.

=== Karyotype ===
The karyotype has been reported to have a diploid chromosome count of 2n = 92 based on a specimen from Peru, but this specimen was later reidentified as a member of the related genus Chibchanomys.

== Threats ==
The species is listed as endangered and is threatened by pollution and habitat loss. Their small range makes them vulnerable to habitat loss. Because they rely on a partially aquatic habitat, water pollution, such as oil spills, also poses a serious threat.
