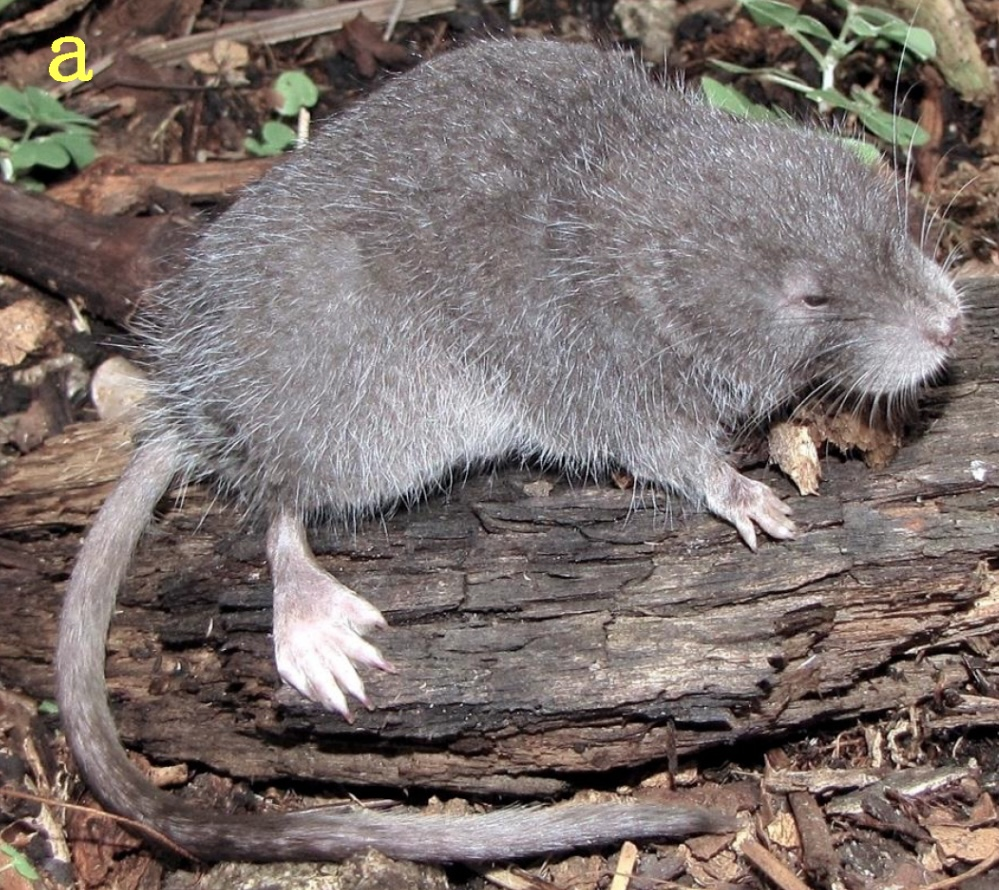
- Incanomys mayopuma

Scientific classification
- Kingdom: Animalia
- Phylum: Chordata
- Class: Mammalia
- Order: Rodentia
- Family: Cricetidae
- Subfamily: Sigmodontinae
- Tribe: Ichthyomyini
- Genus: Incanomys; Zeballos in Zeballos et al., 2025

Type species
- Incanomys mayopuma Zeballos et al., 2025

Other species
- Icanomys parviauris Sánchez-Vendizú et al., 2026

= Incanomys =

Monotypic genus of rodents

Incanomys is a genus of rodents in the family Cricetidae. It contains two species, Incanomys mayopuma and Icanomys parviauris, also known as the Incan water mouse and Incan small-eared water mouse respectively. This small, semi-aquatic carnivorous mammal was discovered in Peru following a three-month research expedition in Machu Picchu.

== Etymology ==
The generic name, Incanomys, is a combination of the word Inca, in reference to the Inca Empire, and Ancient Greek μῦς (mouse).

The specific epithet of the type species, mayopuma, is a Quechua combination of mayu, meaning "river", and puma, the animal of the same name, and refers to its semi-aquatic habits and carnivorous diet. The specific epithet of the second species, parviauris, is derived from the Latin words parvus and auris, meaning "small" and "ear" respectively.

== Appearance ==
This rodent has similar dimensions to other members of its tribe: the head-body length varies between 10.2 and 11.8 cm, with an estimated mass of 37 to 47 g.

It has dark gray fur on its back, a pale gray belly, vestigial external ears concealed within the fur, and a tail longer than the body and covered in hair. Its wide hind feet, with fringes of stiff hairs along the plantar margins and toes, indicate an adaptation to swimming. Cranially, the species is distinguished by a narrow but elongated rostrum, reduced tympanic bullae, and a distinctive dentition, with opisthodont incisors and molars that exhibit posterolophids on m1 and m2.

== Distribution and habitat ==
Its main habitat is the mountain forests with steep streams in the Peruvian Yungas, at an altitude of approximately 2400 to 2643 m, on the humid slopes of the Machu Picchu region. Its range extends from Capishca, in the Huánuco district, to the southern region of Peru, including the surroundings of the Machu Picchu archaeological site in the Cusco district.

== Ecology ==
Its broad hindfeet, along with its long, hairy tail and retractable nostrils, indicate a certain degree of adaptation to swimming and an aquatic environment. Although its diet has not yet been directly observed, its specialized dentition and resemblance to the Ichthyomyini tribe suggest an invertivorous, or even partially carnivorous, diet, likely focused on aquatic prey. The species may use the edges of mountain streams for food, travel, and reproduction.

== Taxonomy ==
The newly established genus Incanomys is distinguished by a unique set of morphological, cranial, dental, auditory, cytogenetic, and molecular characteristics. Notably, it is characterized by an elongated skull with poorly developed tympanic bullae, hypsodont dentition with opisthodont incisors, a middle ear lacking an orbicular apophysis, and a unilocular hemiglandular stomach. The karyotype (2n = 92) is unprecedented in the Ichthyomyini tribe. The external morphology, particularly the presence of long hairs on the feet and tail, as well as the absence of a hypothenar eminence, suggests a semi-aquatic adaptation. All of these traits, coupled with strong genetic divergence, justify its isolation as a distinct genus within the Ichthyomyini.

Although six other rodent species have been identified in the same habitat as Incanomys mayopuma, the authors emphasize the biogeographical isolation of this species from other semi-aquatic rodents of the tribe Ichthyomyini, a divergence attributable to significant geographical barriers, notably the Huancabamba Depression and the Marañón Valley.

== See also ==
- List of living mammal species described in the 2020s
