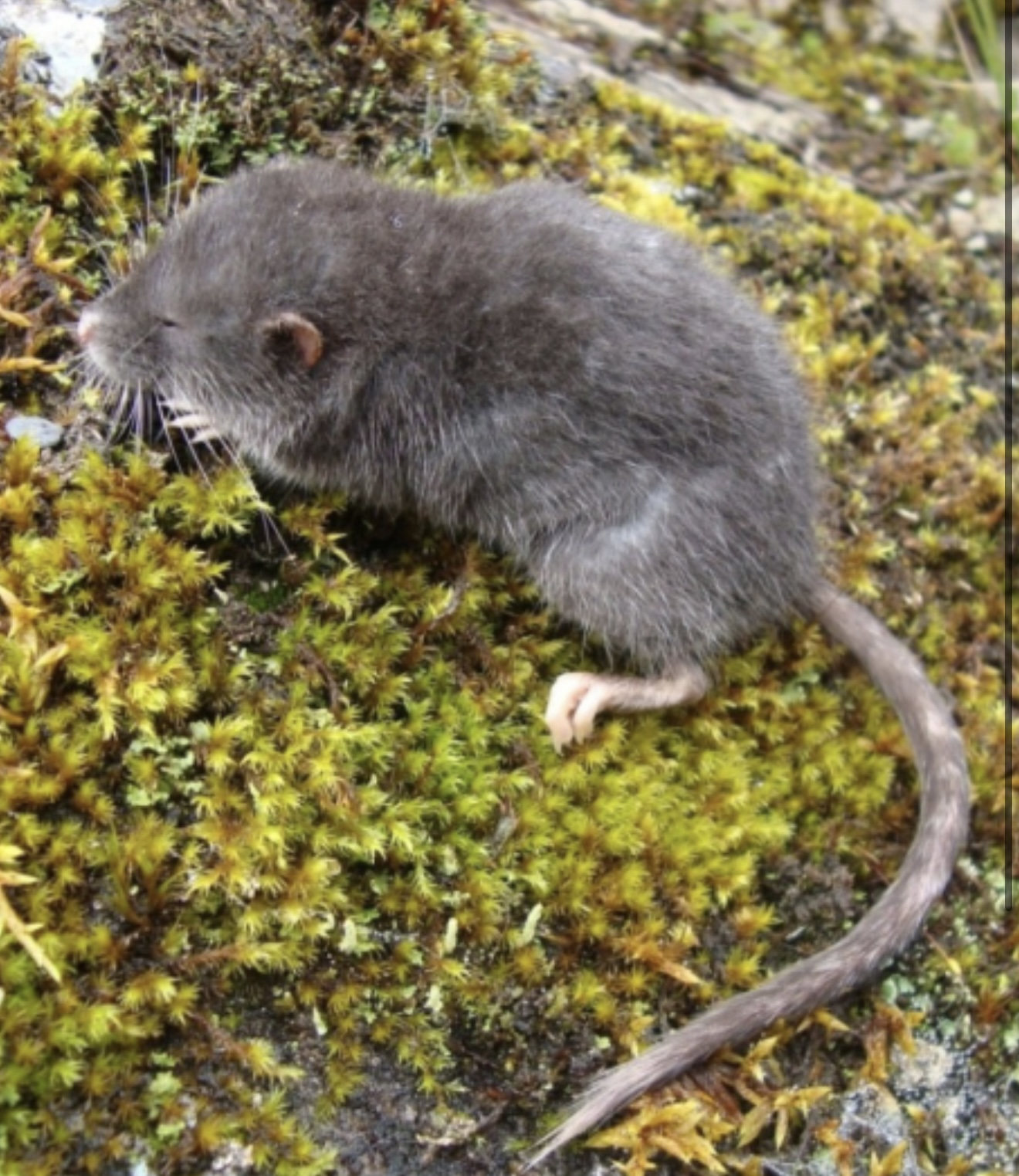
- Montane fish-eating rat

Conservation status
- Least Concern (IUCN 3.1)

Scientific classification
- Kingdom: Animalia
- Phylum: Chordata
- Class: Mammalia
- Order: Rodentia
- Family: Cricetidae
- Subfamily: Sigmodontinae
- Genus: Neusticomys
- Species: N. monticolus

Binomial name
- Neusticomys monticolus Anthony, 1921

= Montane fish-eating rat =

Montane Fish-eating Rat

Species of rodent

The montane fish-eating rat (Neusticomys monticolus) is a species of semiaquatic rodent in the family Cricetidae. It inhabits the Andes Mountains of Colombia and Ecuador.

== Description ==
Montane fish-eating rats are moderately sized rodents, with a head-body length of 10 to 13 centimetres (3.9 to 5.1 in), a tail 8 to 11 centimetres (3.1 to 4.3 in) long, and a body weight averaging 40 grams (1.4 oz). Unlike all other fish-eating rats of the genus Neusticomys, it has dull greyish-black fur, consisting of a thick, velvety underfur and occasional dark guard hairs. The fur is uniform over most of the body, and, unlike in many other rats, remains thick over the tail. However, the toes of all four feet are white, and some individuals have white spots on the upper body, the tip of the tail, or on the chest region. The ears are unusually large for a member of its tribe, and are visible above the thick fur.

Like other ichthyomyine rodents, montane fish-eating rats have feet adapted for swimming in water. However, the adaptations are less extreme in this species than in most others; for example, the feet are narrower, and the fringe of stiff hairs around the toes is less well developed. A short web, not quite reaching the first joint, connects the second and third and the third and fourth toes. Females have six teats, one pair each on the chest, abdominal, and inguinal regions.

== Distribution and habitat ==
Montane fish-eating rats are found only in the mountains of northern Ecuador and western Colombia, where they inhabit fast moving streams flowing through cloud forests. They are found at elevations between 1,800 and 3,754 metres (5,906 and 12,316 ft). There are no recognised subspecies.

== Diet and behaviour ==
Montane fish-eating rats are either crepuscular or nocturnal. Despite their common name, they have never been observed to eat fish. Instead, the stomach contents of the few specimens examined consist solely of freshwater invertebrates, such as scirtid water beetles, crane flies, mayflies, stoneflies, and caddisflies. Little else is known of their habits and biology, because only 47 specimens have ever been collected. One of these specimens, collected in May, early in the wet season, was pregnant, but it is unknown whether or not there is a true breeding season.
