= Atelopus nanay =

Conservation status
- Critically Endangered (IUCN 3.1)

Scientific classification
- Kingdom: Animalia
- Phylum: Chordata
- Class: Amphibia
- Order: Anura
- Family: Bufonidae
- Genus: Atelopus
- Species: A. nanay

Binomial name
- Atelopus nanay Coloma, 2002

Species of amphibian

Atelopus nanay, the Sad harlequin frog, is a species of toads in the family Bufonidae. Atelopus nanay is endemic to Ecuador and inhabits subtropical and tropical high-altitude grasslands, rivers, freshwater marshes, and freshwater springs. It is currently threatened by habitat loss and the Batrachochytrium dendrobatidis fungus. The species name nanay stems from the Quechua word for "sadness", which was chosen to bring attention to the decline of Atelopus species in the Ecuadorian Andes, and to express the loss felt by the native Ecuadorian people.

== Description ==
=== Adult ===
Atelopus nanay is a toad species located in and around the Cajas National Park in Ecuador, occupying a roughly 85 Km^{2} range. Species in the genus Atelopus are also called "harlequin frogs" for their variation in color and are known for being lethargic, diurnal, and small. This genus also houses the greatest species diversity within the Bufinoid family. Atelopus nanay has distinct black skin with dark green or brown markings which is generally smooth but can be warty with small white spiculae along its sides. The underside can range from black to creamy gray to brown. Females range in length from 31.7 - 39.6mm while males are smaller and range in length from 23.6 - 27.3mm. The fingers are not webbed while the feet are partially webbed. Atelopus nanay's head is pointed, the snout extends past the mandible, and the ears are internal and not visible.

=== Tadpoles ===
Tadpoles range from 5.9 - 16.2mm long depending on the developmental stage, with an elongated ovoid body, black coloration, and translucent fins. All Atelopus tadpoles are also uniquely equipped with a sucker on their abdomen which is used to attach themselves to rocks in the streams where they develop.

== Habitat ==
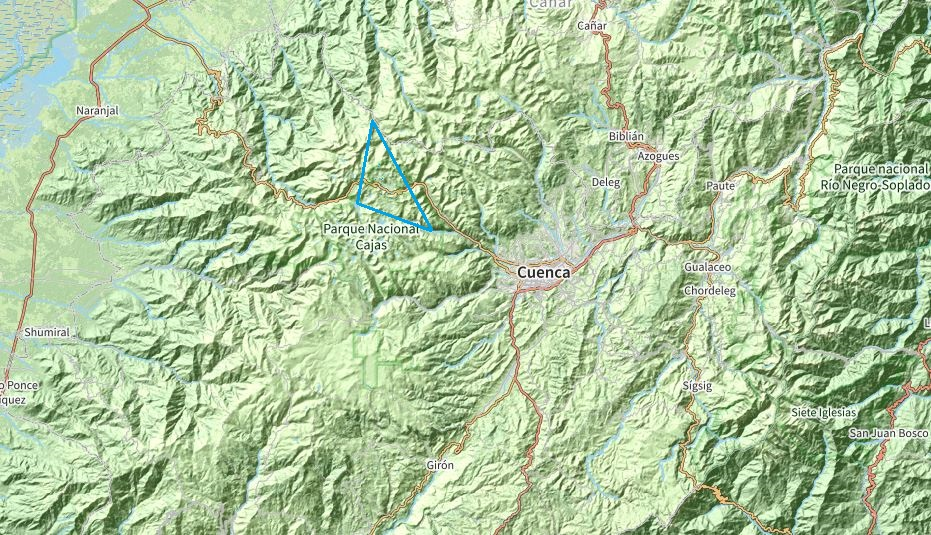
Atelopus nanay distribution in El Cajas National Park

Map of South America highlighting Ecuador

Atelopus nanay has only been found within an 85 km^{2} range in and around Cajas National Park along the Cordillera Occidental mountain range in Ecuador. This subtropical/tropical montane wetland environment sits at ~4000m above sea level, receives 100–200 cm of rain annually, and has an average annual temperature of 3-6 °C. While not much is known about A.nanay's ecology, researchers have noted that they are often associated with streams.

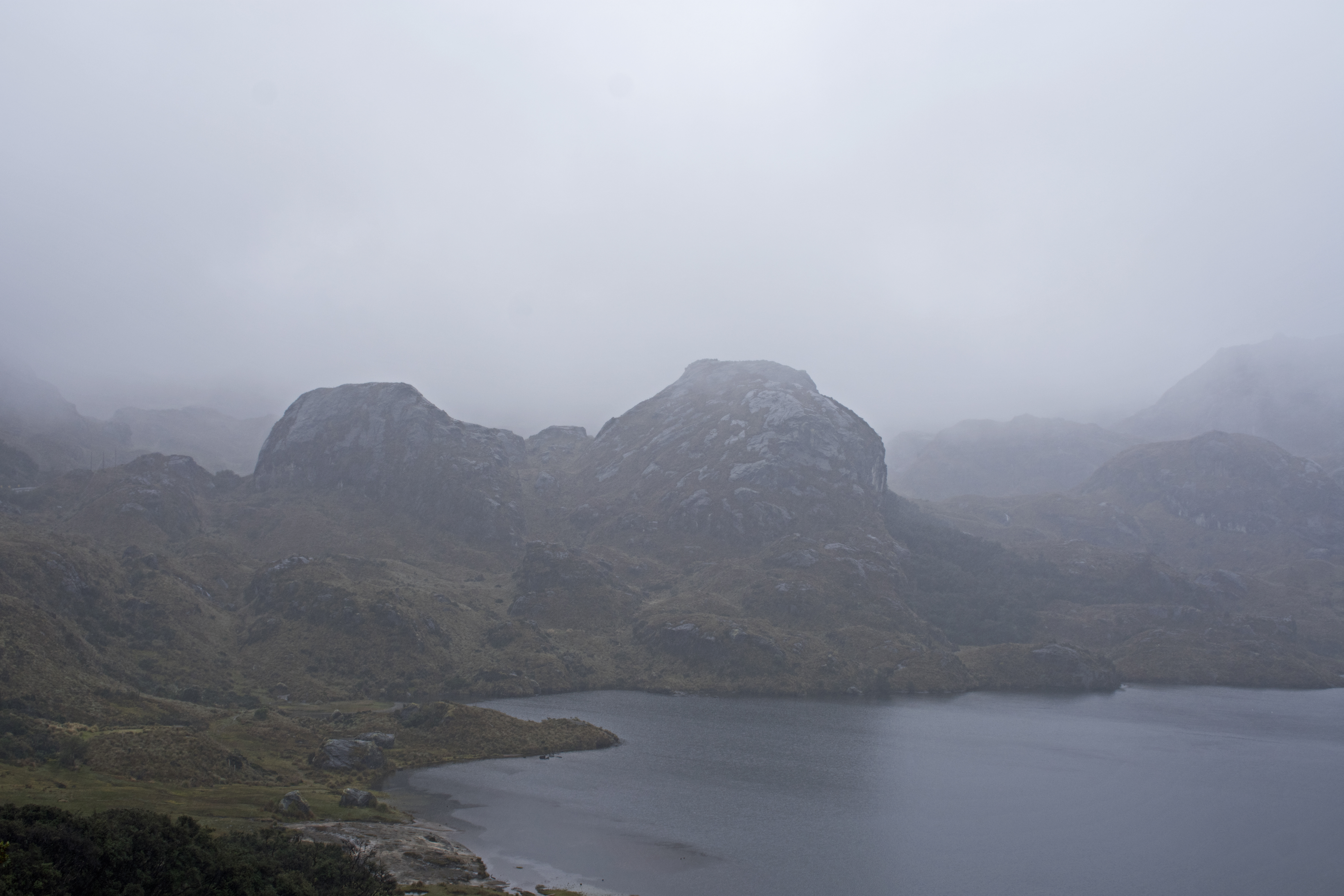
El Cajas National Park

== Threats ==
Atelpous nanay is currently listed as critically endangered by the IUCN due to its small range and assumed population decline. It is assumed to be in decline due to the prevalence of Batrachochytrium dendrobatidis (BD), which is a parasitic fungus that causes the disease chytridiomycosis in amphibians. Chytridiomycosis presents with severe skin disorders, sluggishness, seizures and is often fatal in infected amphibians. Globally, as many as 501 amphibian declines and 90 possible extinctions have been associated with the presence of BD. Currently 80% of the Atelopus genus is considered threatened and all of the 25 Ecuadorian species are at risk of extinction. Other threats include habitat loss from agriculture, road and railroad construction, and logging operations, as well as invasive trout which have been introduced to the streams in which A.nanay tadpoles develop.

== See also ==
- Decline in amphibian populations
- Pathogenic fungi
- Indigenous peoples in Ecuador
- El Cajas National Park
