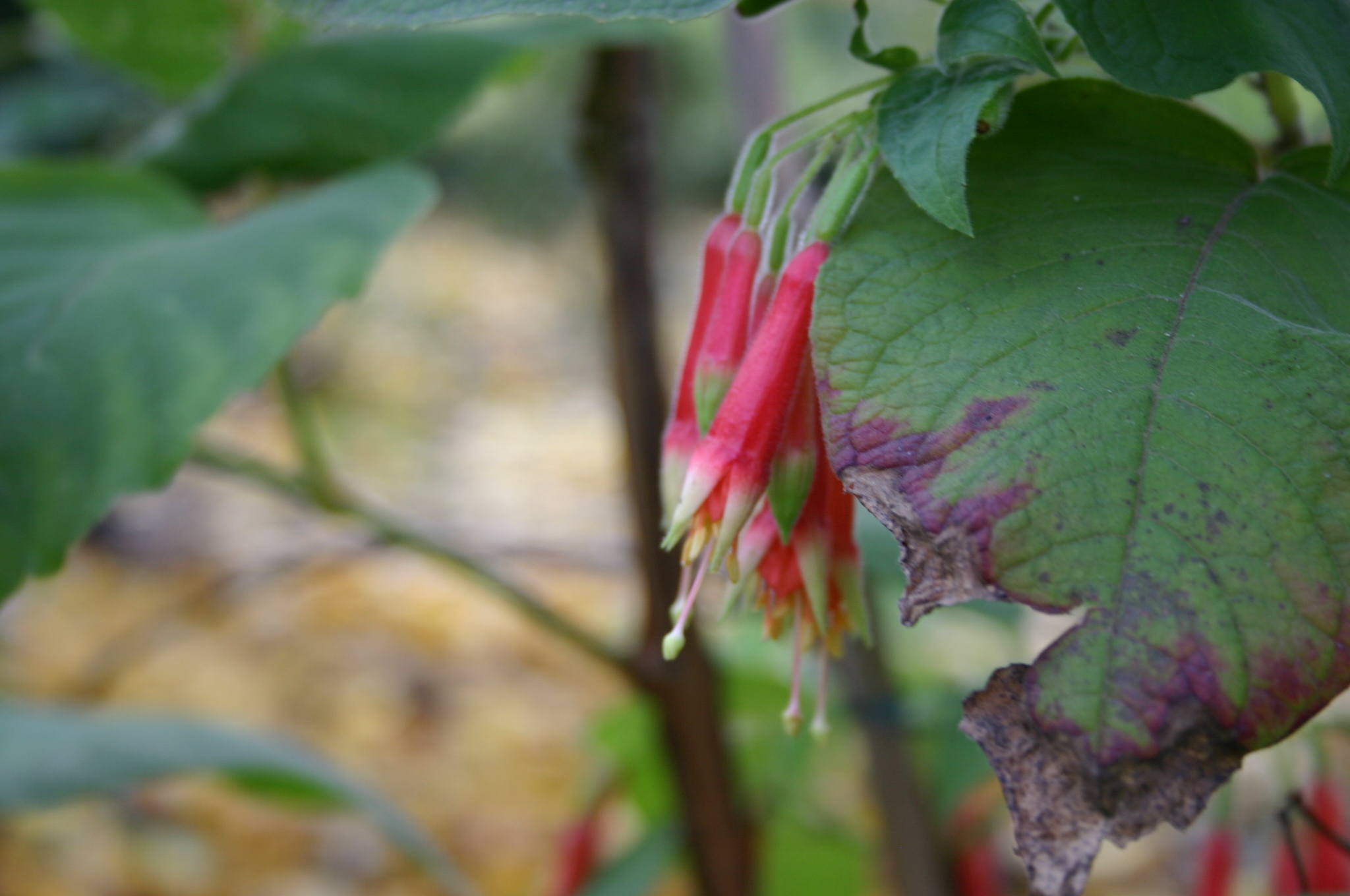
- Flowers and leaves

Conservation status
- Vulnerable (IUCN 3.1)

Scientific classification
- Kingdom: Plantae
- Clade: Tracheophytes
- Clade: Angiosperms
- Clade: Eudicots
- Clade: Rosids
- Order: Myrtales
- Family: Onagraceae
- Genus: Fuchsia
- Species: F. campii

Binomial name
- Fuchsia campii P.E.Berry

= Fuchsia campii =

Species of flowering plant

Fuchsia campii is a shrub in the family Onagraceae endemic to the south Andes of Ecuador (Azuay and Loja provinces), where its habitat is threatened. Its natural habitat is on rainy, humid mountain slopes (alt: 2,300 - 3,500 metres) in forests areas lying amid grasslands, sometimes seen growing alongside streams and roads. The species was described botanically in 1995 by Paul Edward Berry.

A population of F. campii is protected by its location within Parque Nacional Podocarpus and another is likely protected in Parque Nacional Cajas.
