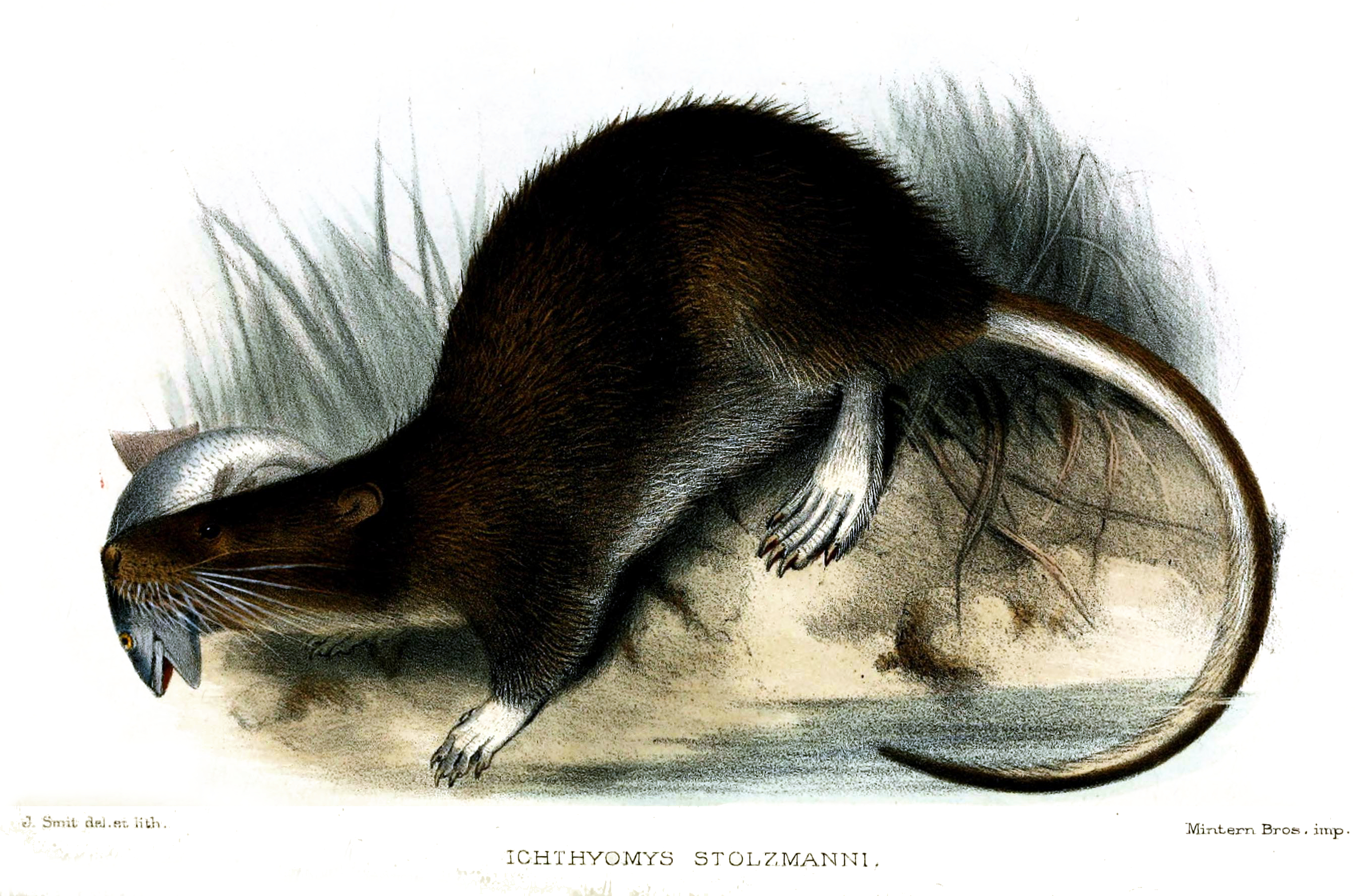
- Stolzmann's crab-eating rat (I. stolzmanni)

Scientific classification
- Kingdom: Animalia
- Phylum: Chordata
- Class: Mammalia
- Order: Rodentia
- Family: Cricetidae
- Subfamily: Sigmodontinae
- Subtribe: Ichthyomyina
- Genus: Ichthyomys; Thomas, 1893

Type species
- Ichthyomys stolzmanni

Species
- Ichthyomys hydrobates Ichthyomys orientalis Ichthyomys pinei Ichthyomys pittieri Ichthyomys stolzmanni Ichthyomys tweedii

= Ichthyomys =

Genus of rodents

Ichthyomys is a genus of semiaquatic Neotropical rodents in the family Cricetidae. It contains the following species:

- Crab-eating rat (Ichthyomys hydrobates)
- Ecuadorean crab-eating rat (I. orientalis)
- Pine's crab-eating rat (I. pinei)
- Pittier's crab-eating rat (I. pittieri)
- Stolzmann's crab-eating rat (I. stolzmanni)
- Tweedy's crab-eating rat (I. tweedii)

Members of the genus tend to be nocturnal and live along fast-flowing streams, where they feed on freshwater invertebrates such as crabs.
