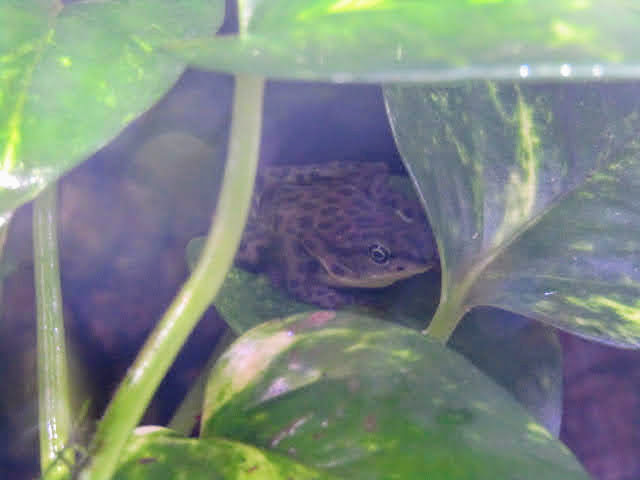
- Atelopus balios in Awashima MARINE PARK

Conservation status
- Critically Endangered (IUCN 3.1)

Scientific classification
- Kingdom: Animalia
- Phylum: Chordata
- Class: Amphibia
- Order: Anura
- Family: Bufonidae
- Genus: Atelopus
- Species: A. balios

Binomial name
- Atelopus balios Peters, 1973

= Atelopus balios =

Species of amphibian

Atelopus balios, the Rio Pescado stubfoot toad, is a species of toad in the family Bufonidae. It is endemic to southwestern Ecuador, with records from Pacific lowlands in Azuay, Cañar, and Guayas Provinces. It is a rare species that was already suspected to be extinct, but a single specimen was discovered in 2011 by a team from Conservation International during a hunt for missing amphibians. The decline in amphibian populations is well documented. The Atelopus balios is Critically Endangered as a result of the widespread amphibian Chytridiomycosis fungus that has decimated other amphibian populations. There are only 10 known findings of the tadpole, Atelopus balios.

== Description ==
Adult males measure 27–29 mm (1.1–1.1 in) and females 35–37 mm (1.4–1.5 in) in snout–vent length. The snout is pointed. The limbs are long and slender. The fingers and toes are partially webbed. The dorsum is olive green and is covered with rounded black spots that also extend to the limbs. The palms, soles, webbing, and perianal region are orange. The belly is almost totally cream yellow, except for the margins to which the black spots extend. The tail makes up 52% of the total body length.

== Habitat and conservation ==
Its natural habitats are tropical lowland rainforests at elevations of 200–460 m (660–1,510 ft) or 0–900 m (0–2,953 ft) above sea level, depending on the source. It is nocturnal and associated with streams. It is threatened by chytridiomycosis and habitat loss caused by agriculture, logging, and pollution. Its range does not include any protected areas.
