= Venezuelan fish-eating rat =

Conservation status
- Vulnerable (IUCN 3.1)

Scientific classification
- Kingdom: Animalia
- Phylum: Chordata
- Class: Mammalia
- Order: Rodentia
- Family: Cricetidae
- Subfamily: Sigmodontinae
- Genus: Daptomys
- Species: D. venezuelae

Binomial name
- Daptomys venezuelae H.E. Anthony, 1929

Species of rodent

The Venezuelan fish-eating rat (Daptomys venezuelae) is a species of a Rodent in the family Cricetidae. It is found in Guyana and Venezuela. For a time, this species was assigned to the genus Neusticomys, but it has since been returned to its original genus.
