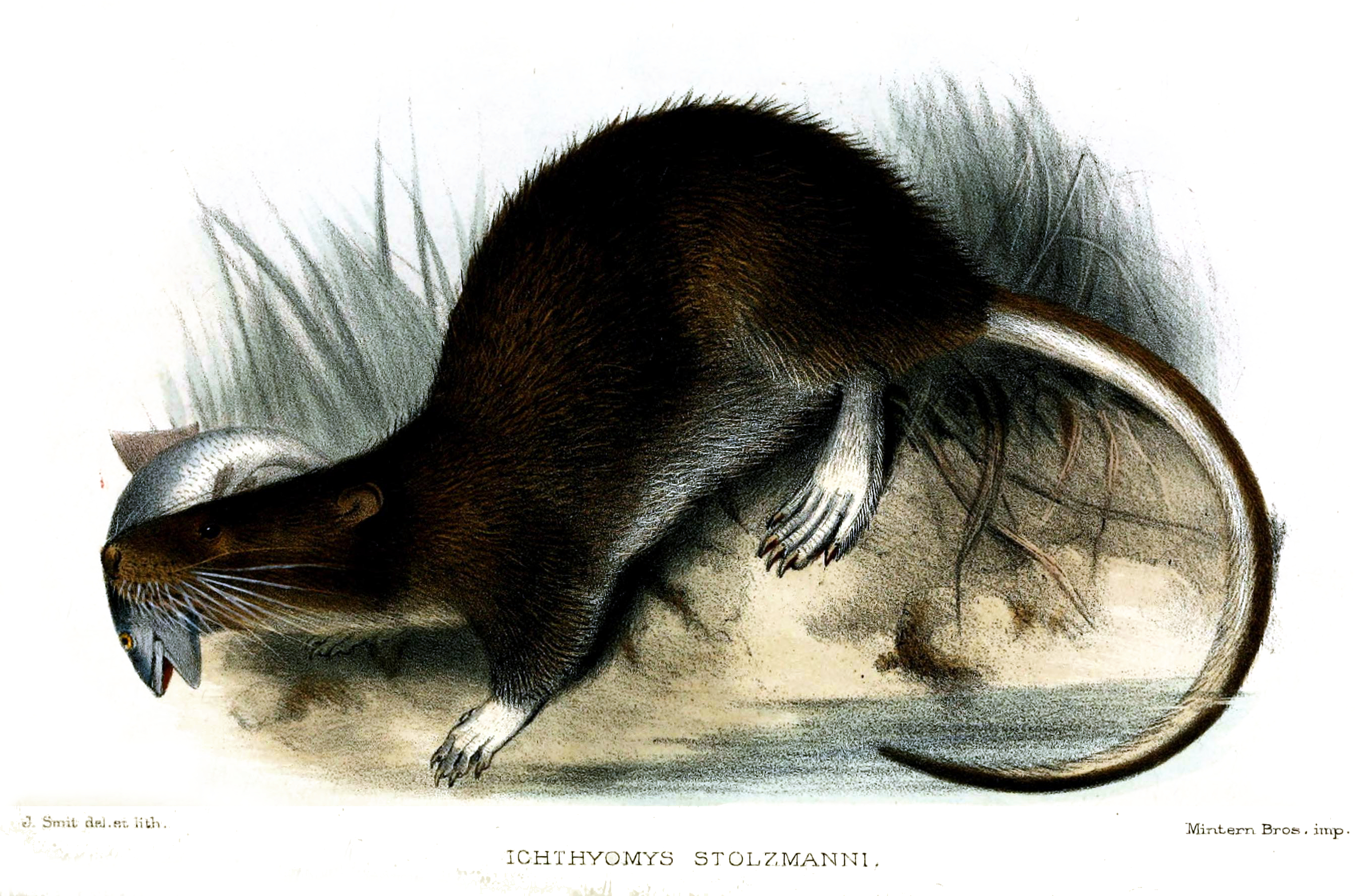

Conservation status
- Data Deficient (IUCN 3.1)

Scientific classification
- Kingdom: Animalia
- Phylum: Chordata
- Class: Mammalia
- Infraclass: Placentalia
- Order: Rodentia
- Family: Cricetidae
- Subfamily: Sigmodontinae
- Genus: Ichthyomys
- Species: I. stolzmanni

Binomial name
- Ichthyomys stolzmanni Thomas, 1893

= Stolzmann's crab-eating rat =

Species of rodent

Stolzmann's crab-eating rat (Ichthyomys stolzmanni) is a species of rodent in the family Cricetidae. It is found in Ecuador and Peru. The species is believed to be nocturnal and semiaquatic, and has been found at an elevation range of 900 to 1700 m. A survey in 2010 indicates that it is becoming a nuisance at local trout farms in the Peruvian puna.

== Etymology ==
The specific name, stolzmanni, is in honor of Polish zoologist Jean Stanislas Stolzmann.
