= Daptomys =

- Daptomys ferrairai

Scientific classification
- Kingdom: Animalia
- Phylum: Chordata
- Class: Mammalia
- Order: Rodentia
- Family: Cricetidae
- Subfamily: Sigmodontinae
- Tribe: Ichthyomyini
- Subtribe: Ichthyomyina
- Genus: Daptomys; Anthony, 1929

Genus of rodents

Daptomys is a genus of sigmodontine rodents.

The following species are recognized in this genus:

- Daptomys ferrairai
- Daptomys musseri
- Daptomys nunashae
- Daptomys oyapocki
- Daptomys peruviensis
- Daptomys venezuelae
