= Chibchan water mouse =

Conservation status
- Data Deficient (IUCN 3.1)

Scientific classification
- Kingdom: Animalia
- Phylum: Chordata
- Class: Mammalia
- Order: Rodentia
- Family: Cricetidae
- Subfamily: Sigmodontinae
- Tribe: Ichthyomyini
- Subtribe: Ichthyomyina
- Genus: Chibchanomys; Voss, 1988
- Species: C. trichotis

Binomial name
- Chibchanomys trichotis (Thomas, 1897)

Species of rodent

The Chibchan water mouse (Chibchanomys trichotis) is a species of rodent in the family Cricetidae. It is found in the Andean highlands of Colombia, Peru, and Venezuela. Its natural habitats are tropical cloud forests and streams at elevations from 2,500 to 2,700 m (8,200 to 8,900 ft). It feeds on snails and possibly small fish. It is the only currently described species in the genus Chibchanomys. It is a dull gray to black rat with a pale gray venter. The rat's tail is slightly longer than its body, measuring 115 to 133 millimetres (4.5 to 5.2 inches) compared to a head-body length of 113 to 125 mm (4.4 to 4.9 in).
