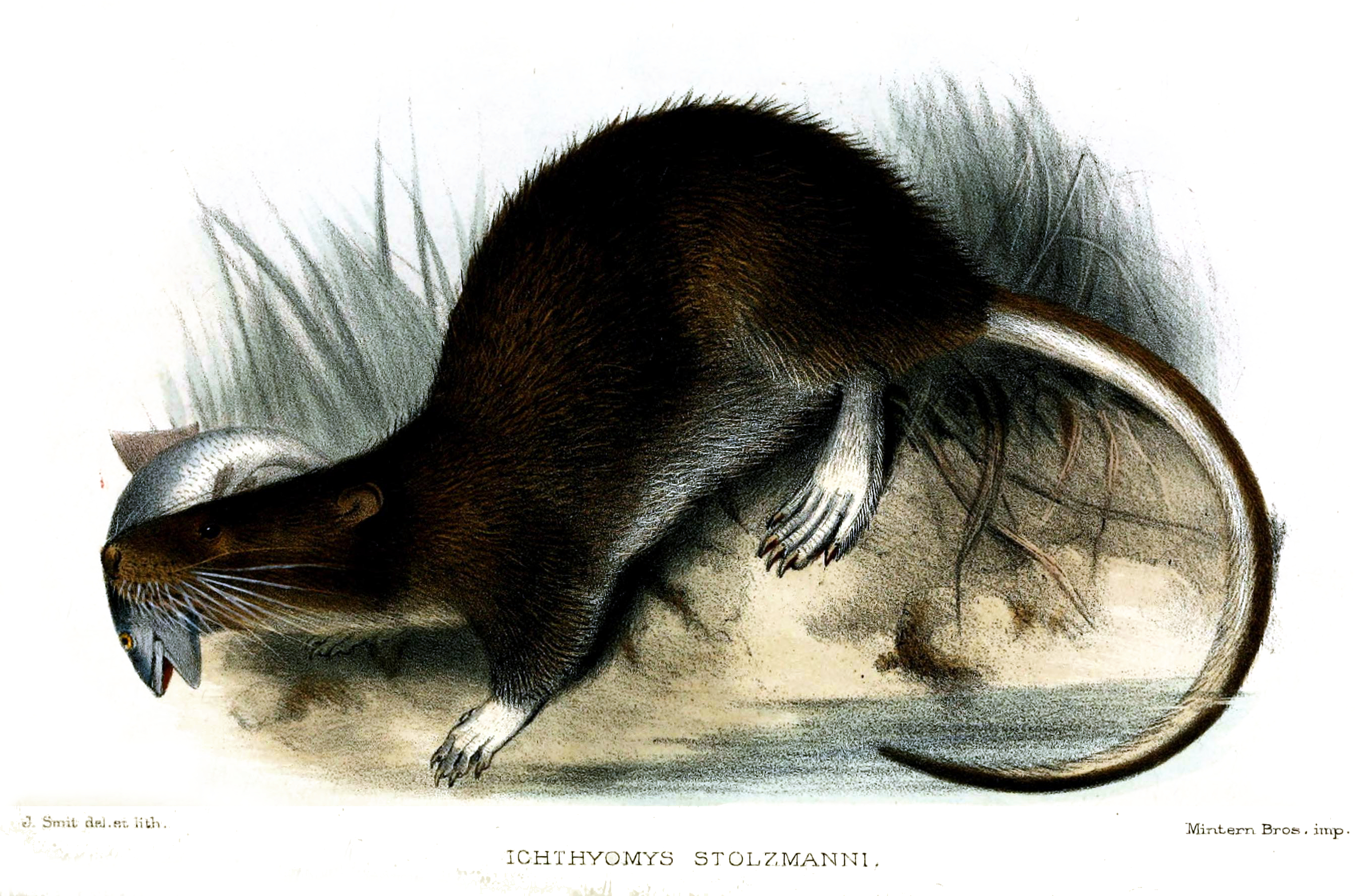
- Stolzmann's crab-eating rat (Ichthyomys stolzmanni)

Scientific classification
- Kingdom: Animalia
- Phylum: Chordata
- Class: Mammalia
- Infraclass: Placentalia
- Order: Rodentia
- Family: Cricetidae
- Subfamily: Sigmodontinae
- Tribe: Ichthyomyini; Cockerell & Printz, 1914

Genera
- Anotomys Thomas, 1906; Chibchanomys Voss, 1988; Ichthyomys Thomas, 1893; Rheomys Thomas, 1906; Neusticomys Anthony, 1921; Daptomys Anthony, 1926

= Ichthyomyini =

Ichthyomyini Temporal range: Pleistocene - Recent

Tribe of rodents

Ichthyomyini is a tribe of New World rats and mice in the subfamily Sigmodontinae. The species within this tribe share the characteristics of all being carnivorous semiaquatic rodents.

The following genera are recognized in this tribe:

- Subtribe Icthyomyina
  - Chibchanomys
  - Ichthyomys - crab-eating rats
  - Rheomys
  - Incanomys
  - Daptomys
  - Neusticomys - fish-eating rats
- Subtribe Anotomyina
  - Anotomys - aquatic rat
