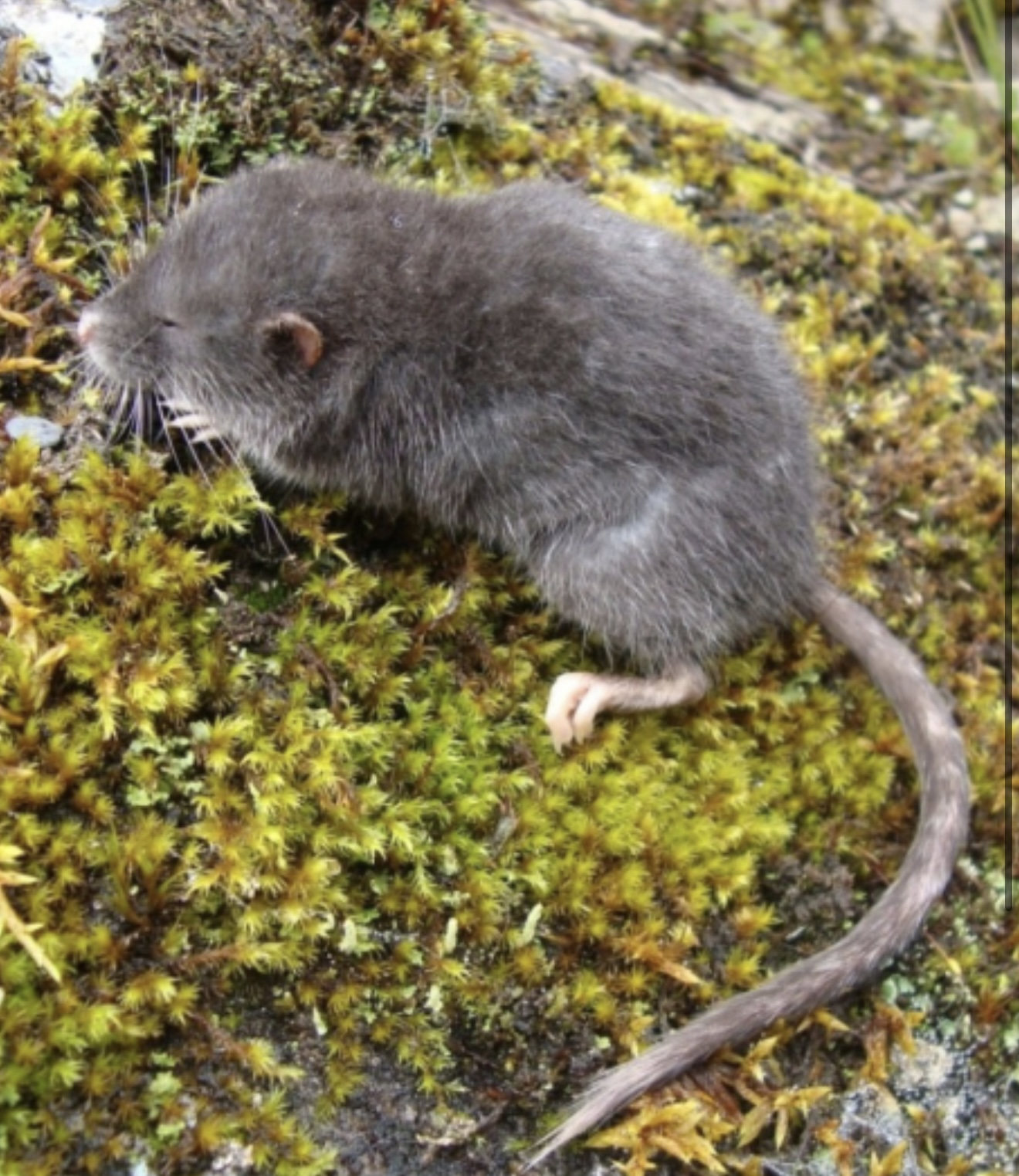
- Neusticomys monticolus

Scientific classification
- Kingdom: Animalia
- Phylum: Chordata
- Class: Mammalia
- Infraclass: Placentalia
- Order: Rodentia
- Family: Cricetidae
- Subfamily: Sigmodontinae
- Subtribe: Ichthyomyina
- Genus: Neusticomys; Anthony, 1921

Type species
- Neusticomys monticolus Anthony, 1921

Species
- N. monticolus N. orcesi N. vossi

= Neusticomys =

Genus of rodents

Neusticomys is a genus of semiaquatic, animalivorous South American rodents in the family Cricetidae.

The term Neusticomys derives from the two ancient greek words νευστικός (neustikós), meaning "able to swim", and μῦς (mûs), meaning "mouse, rat". N. monticolous and N. vossi primarily inhabit montante regions of west Columbia and eastern Ecuador, with the former noted to occur in the Andean Cordillera and the Occidental mountain range at elevations of 1,800-3,750 meters. The rest inhabit tropical lowland forests primarily in the northern and eastern regions of the Amazon rainforest, whereas N. peruviensis is an endemic species to Peru.

This genus contains the following threespecies:

- Montane fish-eating rat (N. monticolus) — Anthony, 1921
- Las Cajas water mouse (N. orcesi) — (P. D. Jenkins & Barnett, 1997)
- Voss' fish-eating rat (N. vossi) — Hanson, D'Elía, Ayers, Cox, Burneo & Lee, 2015

== Distribution ==
Distribution of Neusticomys species
Species	Ecosystem	Endemic to
N. monticolus	Montane ecosystem (at elevations of 1800–3750 meters)	Northern Ecuador and western Colombia
N. vossi	Montane ecosystem (at elevations of 1900–3750 meters)	Southern Colombia and northern and central Ecuador
